= ASD =

ASD most often refers to:

- Autism spectrum disorder, a neurodevelopmental condition
- Acute stress disorder, a psychological response

ASD may also refer to:

== Businesses and organisations ==
=== Education ===
- American School of Douala, Cameroon
- American School of Dubai
- American School of Doha, Qatar
- Academy for Science and Design, Nashua, New Hampshire, U.S.
- Allentown School District, Pennsylvania, U.S.
- American School for the Deaf, West Hartford, Connecticut, U.S.
- Anchorage School District, Alaska, U.S.
- Armstrong School District (Pennsylvania), U.S.
- Augusta School Department, Augusta, Maine
- Achievement School District, Tennessee, U.S.

=== Other organisations ===
- AeroSpace and Defence Industries Association of Europe, a European business association
- Alliance for Securing Democracy, a trans-Atlantic group
- Alliance for Social Democracy, a political party in Benin
- Architectural Services Department, Hong Kong
- Australian Signals Directorate, intelligence agency

== Science and technology ==
=== Biology and medicine ===
- ASD (database), an online directory of allosteric proteins
- Antiseptic Dorogov's Stimulator, a Russian topical veterinary drug
- Aspartate-semialdehyde dehydrogenase, an enzyme
  - asd RNA motif, a conserved RNA structure in certain lactic acid bacteria
- Atrial septal defect, a congenital heart defect

=== Computing ===
- Adaptive software development, a software development process
- Aircraft and Scenery Designer, an add-on for the Microsoft Flight Simulator 4.0 video game
- Application Specific Device, a Wi-Fi certification type

=== Other uses in science and technology ===
- Active sound design, an acoustic technology concept used in automotive vehicles
- Allowable stress design, a structural design methodology
- Aspirating smoke detector, an indoor fire-protection device
- Acceleration spectral density, a mechanical vibration test parameter

== Transportation ==
- Aeronautical Systems Division, US Air Force technical division 1961–1992
- Air Sinai, ICAO airline code ASD
- Amsterdam Centraal station, station code Asd
- Andros Town International Airport, Bahamas, IATA airport code ASD
- Slidell Airport, Louisiana, United States, FAA identifier ASD

== Other uses ==
- ASD (album), by A Skylit Drive, 2015
- Asas language, ISO 639 code asd
- International Association for the Study of Dreams, formerly Association for the Study of Dreams
- United States Assistant Secretary of Defense, an official in the United States government
