= IMP cyclohydrolase =

Class of enzymes

Identifiers
- EC no.: 3.5.4.10
- CAS no.: 9013-81-4

Databases
- BRENDA: enzyme data
- ExPASy: NiceZyme view
- KEGG: enzyme entry
- MetaCyc: metabolic pathway
- Rhea: reactions
- PDB structures: RCSB PDB PDBe PDBsum
- Gene Ontology: AmiGO / QuickGO
Search
- PMC: articles
- PubMed: articles
- NCBI: proteins

IMP cyclohydrolase-like protein
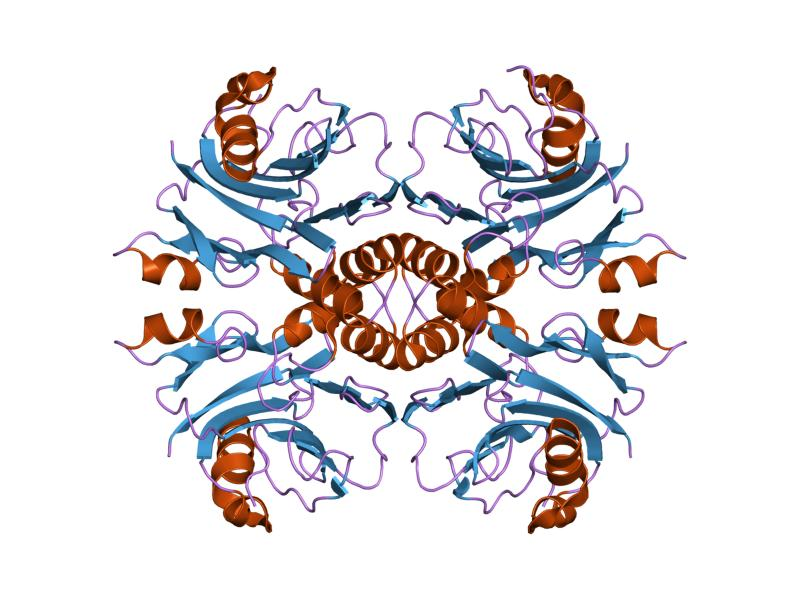
- crystal structure of puro from methanothermobacter thermoautotrophicus

Identifiers
- Symbol: IMP_cyclohyd
- Pfam: PF07826
- InterPro: IPR020600
Available protein structures:
- PDB: IPR020600 PF07826 (ECOD; PDBsum)
- AlphaFold: IPR020600; PF07826

IMP cyclohydrolase (EC 3.5.4.10) is an enzyme that catalyzes the hydrolysis of inosinic acid to 5-formamidoimidazole-4-carboxamide ribotide (FAICAR) or the reverse reaction, a dehydration and cyclisation giving inosinic acid:

inosinic acid
H_{2}O
H_{2}O
FAICAR

In archaea species such as Methanococcus jannaschii the reaction gives inosinic acid, part of de novo purine biosynthesis. In humans, the biosynthesis pathway involves phosphoribosylaminoimidazolecarboxamide formyltransferase in the previous step. There is also a version of the enzyme, inosine monophosphate synthase which incorporates both these steps in one protein.

Formally, the enzyme is a hydrolase, one acting on carbon-nitrogen bonds other than peptide bonds, specifically in cyclic amidines. The systematic name of this enzyme class is IMP 1,2-hydrolase (decyclizing). Other names in use include inosinicase, and inosinate cyclohydrolase.

== Structural studies ==
In most cases this single-domain protein is arranged to form an overall fold that consists of a four-layered alpha-beta-beta-alpha core structure. The two antiparallel beta-sheets pack against each other and are covered by alpha-helices on one face of the molecule. The protein is structurally similar to members of the N-terminal nucleophile (NTN) hydrolase superfamily. A deep pocket was in fact found on the surface of IMP cyclohydrolase in a position equivalent to that of active sites of NTN-hydrolases, but an N-terminal nucleophile could not be found. Therefore, it is thought that this enzyme is structurally but not functionally similar to members of the NTN-hydrolase family.

As of late 2007, 14 structures have been solved for this class of enzymes, with PDB accession codes PDB: 1G8M, PDB: 1M9N, PDB: 1OZ0, PDB: 1P4R, PDB: 1PKX, PDB: 1PL0, PDB: 1THZ, PDB: 2B1G, PDB: 2B1I, PDB: 2IU0, PDB: 2IU3, PDB: 2NTK, PDB: 2NTL, and PDB: 2NTM.
