= ASDE =

ASDE may refer to:

- Airport Surface Detection Equipment (surface movement radar)
  - ASDE-X (Airport Surface Detection Equipment, Model X), an airport runway safety tool
  - ASDE-3 — Airport Movement Area Safety System
- NATO Air Situation Data Exchange (ASDE), see Russo-Georgian War
- Alliance for Self-Directed Education, see autodidactism
- Alliance of Socialists and Democrats for Europe
- Federación de Scouts-Exploradores de España (ASDE; formerly 'Asociación de Scouts de España'), the Spanish Scouts Federation
- ASD Simplified Technical English
- ASDEX Upgrade (Axially Symmetric Divertor Experiment), a divertor tokamak at the Max Planck Institute in Germany
- Santo Domingo Este (ASDE; Ayuntamiento do Santo Domingo Este), Santo Domingo, Dominican Republic

== See also ==
- Asdee
- ASD (disambiguation)
