= N-acetyldiaminopimelate deacetylase =

Class of enzymes

Identifiers
- EC no.: 3.5.1.47
- CAS no.: 99193-93-8

Databases
- BRENDA: enzyme data
- ExPASy: NiceZyme view
- KEGG: enzyme entry
- MetaCyc: metabolic pathway
- Rhea: reactions
- PDB structures: RCSB PDB PDBe PDBsum
- Gene Ontology: AmiGO / QuickGO
Search
- PMC: articles
- PubMed: articles
- NCBI: proteins

N-acetyldiaminopimelate deacetylase (EC 3.5.1.47) is an enzyme that catalyzes the chemical reaction

N-acetyl-LL-2,6-diaminopimelic acid
H_{2}O
(S,S)-2,6-diaminopimelic acid
+ CH_{3}COOH

The enzyme characterised from Bacillus megaterium hydrolyses N-acetyl-LL-2,6-diaminopimelic acid to (S,S)-2,6-diaminopimelic acid and acetic acid The reaction is part of the biosynthesis of the amino acid, lysine.

This enzyme is a hydrolase, one acting on carbon-nitrogen bonds other than peptide bonds, specifically in linear amides. The systematic name of this enzyme class is N6-acetyl-LL-2,6-diaminoheptanedioate amidohydrolase. Other names in common use include N-acetyl-L-diaminopimelic acid deacylase, N-acetyl-LL-diaminopimelate deacylase, and 6-N-acetyl-LL-2,6-diaminoheptanedioate amidohydrolase.
