= DHDPS =

DHDPS may refer to:

- 4-hydroxy-tetrahydrodipicolinate synthase
- 4,4-Dihydroxydiphenylsulfone (Bisphenol S)
