= Nitrogen assimilation =

Organic nitrogen from inorganic nitrogen

Nitrogen assimilation is the formation of organic nitrogen compounds like amino acids from inorganic nitrogen compounds present in the environment. Organisms like plants, fungi and certain bacteria that can fix nitrogen gas (N_{2}) depend on the ability to assimilate nitrate or ammonia for their needs. Other organisms, like animals, depend entirely on organic nitrogen from their food.

== Nitrogen assimilation in plants ==
Plants absorb nitrogen from the soil in the form of nitrate (NO_{3}^{−}) and ammonium (NH_{4}^{+}). In aerobic soils where nitrification can occur, nitrate is usually the predominant form of available nitrogen that is absorbed. However this is not always the case as ammonia can predominate in grasslands and in flooded, anaerobic soils like rice paddies. Plant roots themselves can affect the abundance of various forms of nitrogen by changing the pH and secreting organic compounds or oxygen. This influences microbial activities like the inter-conversion of various nitrogen species, the release of ammonia from organic matter in the soil and the fixation of nitrogen by non-nodule-forming bacteria.

Ammonium ions are absorbed by the plant via ammonia transporters. Nitrate is taken up by several nitrate transporters that use a proton gradient to power the transport. Nitrogen is transported from the root to the shoot via the xylem in the form of nitrate, dissolved ammonia and amino acids. Usually (but not always) most of the nitrate reduction is carried out in the shoots while the roots reduce only a small fraction of the absorbed nitrate to ammonia. Ammonia (both absorbed and synthesized) is incorporated into amino acids via the glutamine synthetase-glutamate synthase (GS-GOGAT) pathway. While nearly all the ammonia in the root is usually incorporated into amino acids at the root itself, plants may transport significant amounts of ammonium ions in the xylem to be fixed in the shoots. This may help avoid the transport of organic compounds down to the roots just to carry the nitrogen back as amino acids.

Nitrate reduction is carried out in two steps. Nitrate is first reduced to nitrite (NO_{2}^{−}) in the cytosol by nitrate reductase using NADH or NADPH. Nitrite is then reduced to ammonia in the chloroplasts (plastids in roots) by a ferredoxin dependent nitrite reductase. In photosynthesizing tissues, it uses an isoform of ferredoxin (Fd1) that is reduced by PSI while in the root it uses a form of ferredoxin (Fd3) that has a less negative midpoint potential and can be reduced easily by NADPH. In non photosynthesizing tissues, NADPH is generated by glycolysis and the pentose phosphate pathway.

In the chloroplasts, glutamine synthetase incorporates this ammonia as the amide group of glutamine using glutamate as a substrate. Glutamate synthase (Fd-GOGAT and NADH-GOGAT) transfer the amide group onto a 2-oxoglutarate molecule producing two glutamates. Further transaminations are carried out make other amino acids (most commonly asparagine) from glutamine. While the enzyme glutamate dehydrogenase (GDH) does not play a direct role in the assimilation, it protects the mitochondrial functions during periods of high nitrogen metabolism and takes part in nitrogen remobilization.

=== pH and Ionic balance during nitrogen assimilation ===
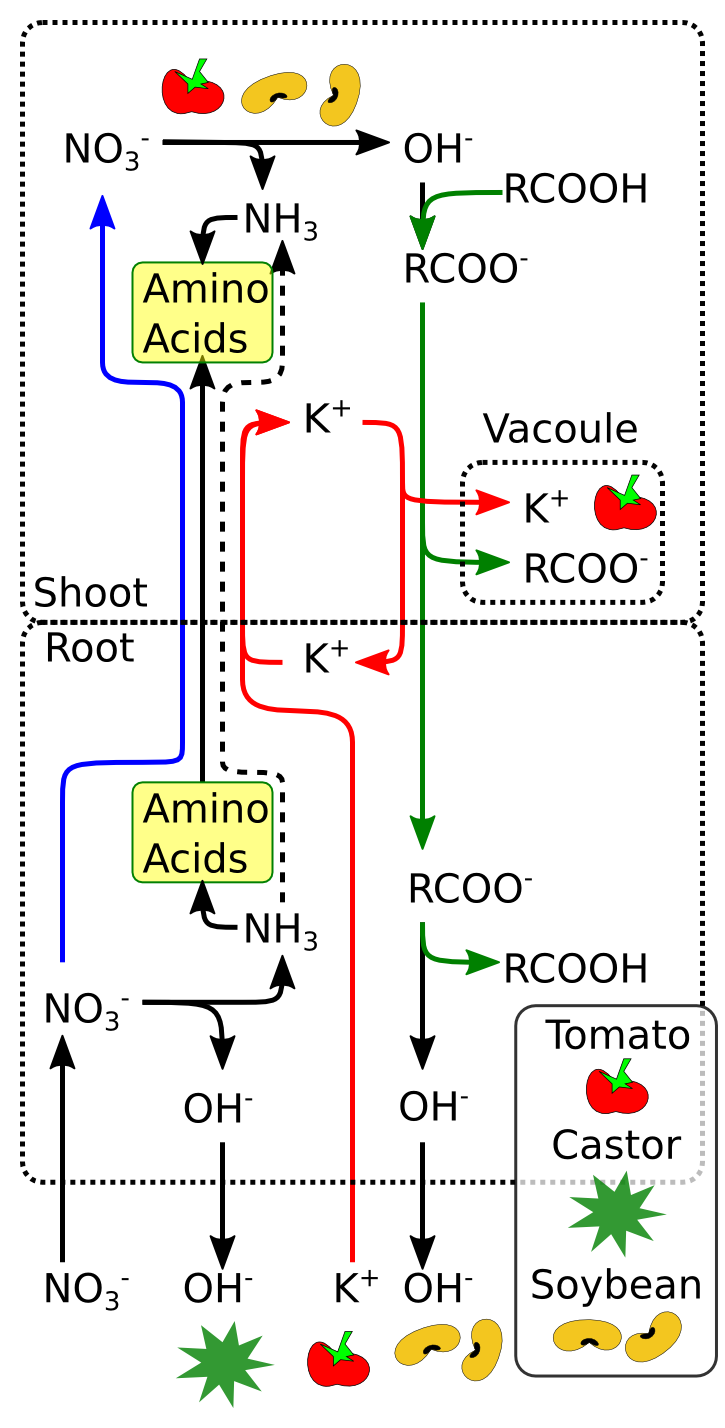
Different plants use different pathways to different levels. Tomatoes take in a lot of K^{+} and accumulate salts in their vacuoles, castor reduces nitrate in the roots to a large extent and excretes the resulting alkali. Soy bean plants move a large amount of malate to the roots where they convert it to alkali while the potassium is recirculated.

Every nitrate ion reduced to ammonia produces one OH^{−} ion. To maintain a pH balance, the plant must either excrete it into the surrounding medium or neutralize it with organic acids. This results in the medium around the plants roots becoming alkaline when they take up nitrate.

To maintain ionic balance, every NO_{3}^{−} taken into the root must be accompanied by either the uptake of a cation or the excretion of an anion. Plants like tomatoes take up metal ions like K^{+}, Na^{+}, Ca^{2+} and Mg^{2+} to exactly match every nitrate taken up and store these as the salts of organic acids like malate and oxalate. Other plants like the soybean balance most of their NO_{3}^{−} intake with the excretion of OH^{−} or HCO_{3}^{−}.

Plants that reduce nitrates in the shoots and excrete alkali from their roots need to transport the alkali in an inert form from the shoots to the roots. To achieve this they synthesize malic acid in the leaves from neutral precursors like carbohydrates. The potassium ions brought to the leaves along with the nitrate in the xylem are then sent along with the malate to the roots via the phloem. In the roots, the malate is consumed. When malate is converted back to malic acid prior to use, an OH^{−} is released and excreted. (RCOO^{−} + H_{2}O → RCOOH + OH^{−}) The potassium ions are then recirculated up the xylem with fresh nitrate. Thus the plants avoid having to absorb and store excess salts and also transport the OH^{−}.

Plants like castor reduce a lot of nitrate in the root itself, and excrete the resulting base. Some of the base produced in the shoots is transported to the roots as salts of organic acids while a small amount of the carboxylates are just stored in the shoot itself.

== Nitrogen use efficiency ==
Nitrogen use efficiency

Nitrogen use efficiency (NUE) is the proportion of nitrogen present that a plant absorbs and uses. Improving nitrogen use efficiency and thus fertilizer efficiency is important to make agriculture more sustainable, by reducing pollution (fertilizer runoff) and production cost and increasing yield. Worldwide, crops generally have less than 50% NUE. Better fertilizers, improved crop management, selective breeding, and genetic engineering can increase NUE.

Nitrogen use efficiency can be measured at various levels: the crop plant, the soil, by fertilizer input, by ecosystem productivity, etc. At the level of photosynthesis in leaves, it is termed photosynthetic nitrogen use efficiency (PNUE).
