= Inosine monophosphate synthase =

Mammalian protein found in Homo sapiens

ATIC
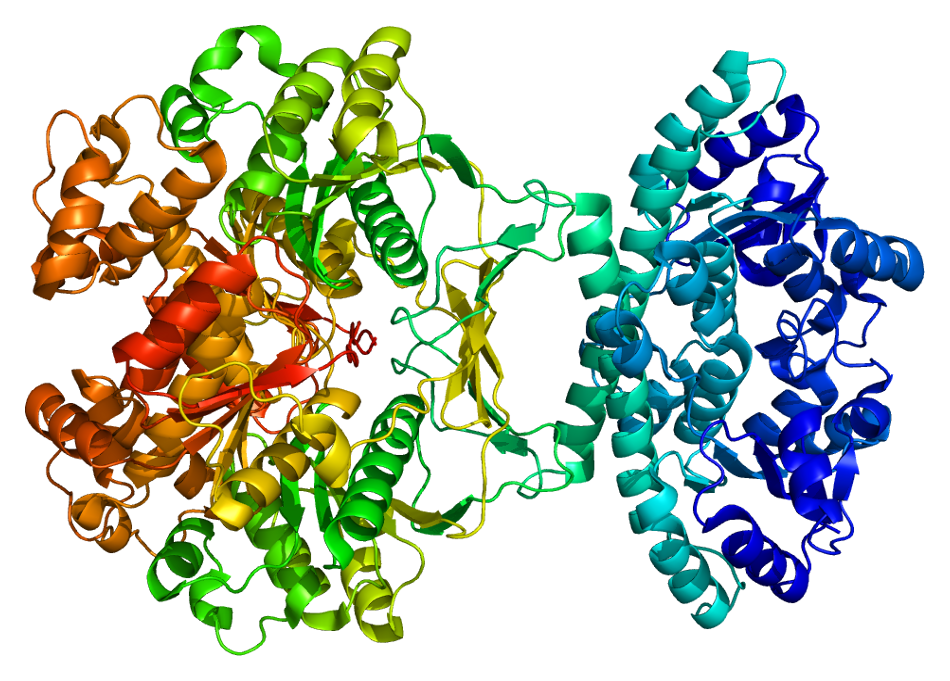

Identifiers
- Aliases: ATIC, AICAR, AICARFT, HEL-S-70p, IMPCHASE, PURH, 5-aminoimidazole-4-carboxamide ribonucleotide formyltransferase/IMP cyclohydrolase
- External IDs: OMIM: 601731; MGI: 1351352; GeneCards: ATIC
Available structures
PDB	Ortholog search: PDBe RCSB
PDB	List of PDB id codes 1P4R, 1PKX, 1PL0
Enzyme activity
EC #	BRENDA	ExPASy	KEGG	MetaCyc
2.1.2.3	↗	↗	↗	↗
3.5.4.10	↗	↗	↗	↗

Gene location (Human)
Chr.	Chromosome 2 (human)
Band	2q35	Start	215,311,956 bp
Band	2q35	End	215,349,773 bp

Gene location (Mouse)
Chr.	Chromosome 1 (mouse)
Band	1|1 C3	Start	71,596,309 bp
Band	1|1 C3	End	71,618,790 bp
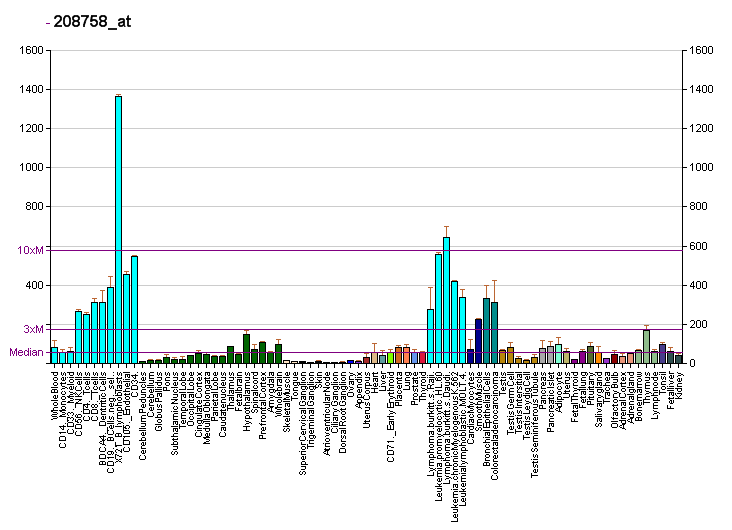
RNA expression pattern
Bgee	Human / Mouse (ortholog); Top expressed in: mucosa of transverse colon; stromal cell of endometrium; rectum; anterior pituitary; ventricular zone; right adrenal cortex; body of pancreas; gonad; ganglionic eminence; left adrenal cortex / Top expressed in: hand; epiblast; condyle; mandibular prominence; maxillary prominence; transitional epithelium of urinary bladder; abdominal wall; mesenteric lymph nodes; primitive streak; foot; More reference expression data
BioGPS	More reference expression data
Gene ontology
Molecular function	transferase activity; protein homodimerization activity; IMP cyclohydrolase activity; catalytic activity; phosphoribosylaminoimidazolecarboxamide formyltransferase activity; hydrolase activity; cadherin binding
Cellular component	cytosol; membrane; mitochondrion; extracellular exosome; plasma membrane
Biological process	purine nucleotide biosynthetic process; dihydrofolate metabolic process; 'de novo' IMP biosynthetic process; brainstem development; ribonucleotide metabolic process; cerebellum development; nucleoside metabolic process; tetrahydrofolate biosynthetic process; animal organ regeneration; response to inorganic substance; cerebral cortex development; purine ribonucleoside monophosphate biosynthetic process; metabolism; nucleobase-containing compound metabolic process; cellular response to interleukin-7
Sources:Amigo / QuickGO
Orthologs
Databases	NCBI: entry; OMA: entry
Species	Human	Mouse
Entrez	471	108147
Ensembl	ENSG00000138363	ENSMUSG00000026192
UniProt	P31939	Q9CWJ9
RefSeq (mRNA)	NM_004044	NM_026195
RefSeq (protein)	NP_004035	NP_080471
Location (UCSC)	Chr 2: 215.31 – 215.35 Mb	Chr 1: 71.6 – 71.62 Mb
PubMed search
- Wikidata
View/Edit Human	View/Edit Mouse

Bifunctional purine biosynthesis protein PURH is a protein that in humans is encoded by the ATIC gene.

ATIC encodes an enzyme which generates inosine monophosphate from aminoimidazole carboxamide ribonucleotide (AICA ribonucleotide).

It has two functions:

- EC 2.1.2.3 - phosphoribosylaminoimidazolecarboxamide formyltransferase

In this step, AICA ribonucleotide is formylated, with the formyl group being transferred from the cofactor 5,10-methylenetetrahydrofolate (5,10-CH_{2}-THF).

AICA ribonucleotide
+ 5,10-CH_{2}-THF
FAICAR
+ tetrahydrofolate
- EC 3.5.4.10 - IMP cyclohydrolase

This enzyme forms the purine ring of inosine monophosphate by dehydration and cyclisation of N-formyl AICA ribonucleotide.

FAICAR
H_{2}O
inosinic acid
