= Succinyl-diaminopimelate desuccinylase =

Class of enzymes

Identifiers
- EC no.: 3.5.1.18
- CAS no.: 9024-94-6

Databases
- BRENDA: enzyme data
- ExPASy: NiceZyme view
- KEGG: enzyme entry
- MetaCyc: metabolic pathway
- Rhea: reactions
- PDB structures: RCSB PDB PDBe PDBsum
- Gene Ontology: AmiGO / QuickGO
Search
- PMC: articles
- PubMed: articles
- NCBI: proteins

Succinyl-diaminopimelate desuccinylase (EC 3.5.1.18) is an enzyme that catalyzes the chemical reaction

N-succinyl-LL-2,6-diaminopimelic acid
H_{2}O
diaminopimelic acid
+
succinic acid

The enzyme characterised from a number of blue-green algae and bacteria including Escherichia coli hydrolyses N-succinyl-LL-2,6-diaminopimelic acid to diaminopimelic acid and succinic acid. The product is a biosynthetic precursor to the amino acid, L-lysine. Inhibitors of the enzyme have been sought as potential antibiotics. An X-ray structure of the enzyme has been obtained to assist in the design of inhibitors.

This enzyme is a of hydrolase, one acting on carbon-nitrogen bonds other than peptide bonds, specifically in linear amides. The systematic name of this enzyme class is N-succinyl-LL-2,6-diaminoheptanedioate amidohydrolase. This enzyme is also called N-succinyl-L-alpha,epsilon-diaminopimelic acid deacylase and DapE.
