= Glutamate synthase (NADH) =

glutamate synthase (NADH)

Identifiers
- EC no.: 1.4.1.14
- CAS no.: 65589-88-0

Databases
- BRENDA: enzyme data
- ExPASy: NiceZyme view
- KEGG: enzyme entry
- MetaCyc: metabolic pathway
- Rhea: reactions
- PDB structures: RCSB PDB PDBe PDBsum
- Gene Ontology: AmiGO / QuickGO
Search
- PMC: articles
- PubMed: articles
- NCBI: proteins

In enzymology, glutamate synthase (NADH) (EC 1.4.1.14) is an enzyme that catalyzes the chemical reaction

L-glutamine
+
2-oxoglutarate
+ NADH
H^{+}
2
L-glutamic acid
+ NAD^{+}

Glutamate synthase facilitates the ammonium assimilation pathway, which follows the enzymes, nitrite reductase and glutamine synthase. An ammonium produced by the nitrite reductase reaction will be incorporated into carbon skeleton backbone by glutamine synthase. Glutamine will be produced because of the introduction of ammonium in the carbon backbone, which can be converted into glutamate by glutamate synthase of another pathway.

These processes are common in plant roots because if the nitrogen deficient conditions exist (with access to ammonium and nitrate ions), there will be a first priority of ammonium uptake. The reaction only proceeds in the direction of glutamic acid production: it converts one unit of glutamine and one 2-oxoglutarate into two units of product, using reduced nicotinamide adenine dinucleotide (NADH) as cofactor.

This enzyme belongs to the family of oxidoreductases, specifically those acting on the CH-NH_{2} group of donors with NAD^{+} or NADP^{+} as acceptor. This enzyme participates in glutamate metabolism and nitrogen assimilation. It uses the cofactor, flavin mononucleotide.

== Nomenclature ==
The systematic name of this enzyme class is L-glutamate:NAD^{+} oxidoreductase (transaminating). Other names in common use include:

- glutamate (reduced nicotinamide adenine dinucleotide) synthase,
- glutamate synthase (NADH),
- L-glutamate synthetase(NADH),
- NADH-dependent glutamate synthase,
- NADH-glutamate synthase, and
- NADH-Glutamine oxoglutarate aminotransferase (NADH-GOGAT).

== See also ==
- Glutamate synthase (ferredoxin)
- Glutamate synthase (NADPH)
