= N-acetylneuraminate lyase =

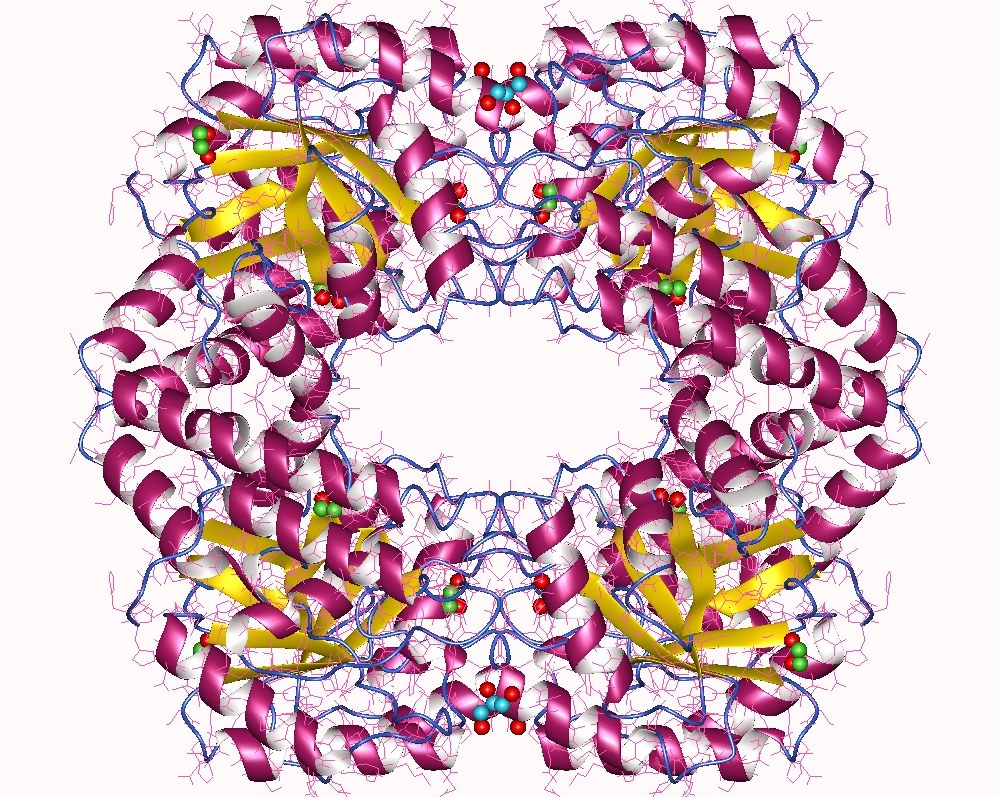
- N-acetylneuramininate lyase tetramer, Aliivibrio salmonicida

Identifiers
- EC no.: 4.1.3.3
- CAS no.: 9027-60-5

Databases
- IntEnz: IntEnz view
- BRENDA: BRENDA entry
- ExPASy: NiceZyme view
- KEGG: KEGG entry
- MetaCyc: metabolic pathway
- PRIAM: profile
- PDB structures: RCSB PDB PDBe PDBsum
- Gene Ontology: AmiGO / QuickGO
Search
- PMC: articles
- PubMed: articles
- NCBI: proteins

The enzyme N-acetylneuraminate lyase (EC 4.1.3.3) catalyzes the chemical reaction

N-acetylneuraminate $\rightleftharpoons$ N-acetyl-D-mannosamine + pyruvate

This enzyme belongs to the family of lyases, specifically the oxo-acid-lyases, which cleave carbon-carbon bonds. The systematic name of this enzyme class is N-acetylneuraminate pyruvate-lyase (N-acetyl-D-mannosamine-forming). Other names in common use include N-acetylneuraminic acid aldolase, acetylneuraminate lyase, sialic aldolase, sialic acid aldolase, sialate lyase, N-acetylneuraminic aldolase, neuraminic aldolase, N-acetylneuraminate aldolase, neuraminic acid aldolase, N-acetylneuraminic acid aldolase, neuraminate aldolase, N-acetylneuraminic lyase, N-acetylneuraminic acid lyase, NPL, NALase, NANA lyase, acetylneuraminate pyruvate-lyase, and N-acetylneuraminate pyruvate-lyase. This enzyme participates in aminosugars metabolism.

== Structural studies ==
As of late 2007, 10 structures have been solved for this class of enzymes, with PDB accession codes 1F5Z, 1F6K, 1F6P, 1F73, 1F74, 1F7B, 1FDY, 1FDZ, 1HL2, and 1NAL.
