= Succinyldiaminopimelate transaminase =

Identifiers
- EC no.: 2.6.1.17
- CAS no.: 9030-46-0

Databases
- IntEnz: IntEnz view
- BRENDA: BRENDA entry
- ExPASy: NiceZyme view
- KEGG: KEGG entry
- MetaCyc: metabolic pathway
- PRIAM: profile
- PDB structures: RCSB PDB PDBe PDBsum
- Gene Ontology: AmiGO / QuickGO
Search
- PMC: articles
- PubMed: articles
- NCBI: proteins

Succinyldiaminopimelate transaminase (EC 2.6.1.17) is an enzyme that catalyzes the reversible chemical reaction

N-succinyl-LL-2,6-diaminopimelic acid
+
α-ketoglutaric acid
L-2-succinylamino-6-oxoheptanedioic acid
+
L-glutamic acid

The two substrates of this enzyme characterised from Escherichia coli are N-succinyl-LL-2,6-diaminopimelic acid and α-ketoglutaric acid. Its products are L-2-succinylamino-6-oxoheptanedioic acid and L-glutamic acid.

This enzyme is a transferase, specifically a transaminase, which transfer nitrogenous groups. The systematic name of this enzyme class is N-succinyl-L-2,6-diaminoheptanedioate:2-oxoglutarate aminotransferase. Other names in common use include succinyldiaminopimelate aminotransferase, and N-succinyl-L-diaminopimelic glutamic transaminase. It participates in lysine biosynthesis and uses pyridoxal phosphate as a cofactor.
