= Glutamate synthase =

Glutamate synthase (also known as Glutamine oxoglutarate aminotransferase) is an enzyme and frequently abbreviated as GOGAT. This enzyme manufactures glutamate from glutamine and α-ketoglutarate, and thus along with glutamine synthetase (abbreviated GS) plays a central role in the regulation of nitrogen assimilation in photosynthetic eukaryotes and prokaryotes. This is of great importance as primary productivity in many marine environments is regulated by the availability of inorganic nitrogen.

The primary sources of inorganic nitrogen used by marine algae are nitrate and ammonium. Both forms are ultimately incorporated into amino acids through the sequential reaction of glutamine synthetase (GS) and glutamate synthase (glutamine:2-oxoglutarate aminotransferase; GOGAT). GOGAT isoenzymes catalyze the transfer of the amido nitrogen of glutamine to 2-oxoglutarate using pyridine nucleotides (NADH-/NADPH-dependent) or ferredoxin (ferredoxin dependent) as reductants. They are called NADH-GOGAT and Fd-GOGAT respectively. In photosynthetic eukaryotes, GS and GOGAT isoenzymes are localized in the cytosol and chloroplast.

Fd-GOGAT is found strictly in cyanobacteria and photosynthetic eukaryotes, and the gene is located in the chloroplast of rhodophytes and in the nucleus of vascular plants, but in both cases its product is active in the chloroplast. NADH-GOGAT is found in the nucleus of vascular plants, fungi, and diatoms, while NADPH-GOGAT is found in non-photosynthetic bacteria and archaea.

== See also ==
- Glutamate synthase (NADPH)
- Glutamate synthase (NADH)
- Glutamate synthase (ferredoxin)
