= Glutamate synthase (NADPH) =

glutamate synthase (NADPH)
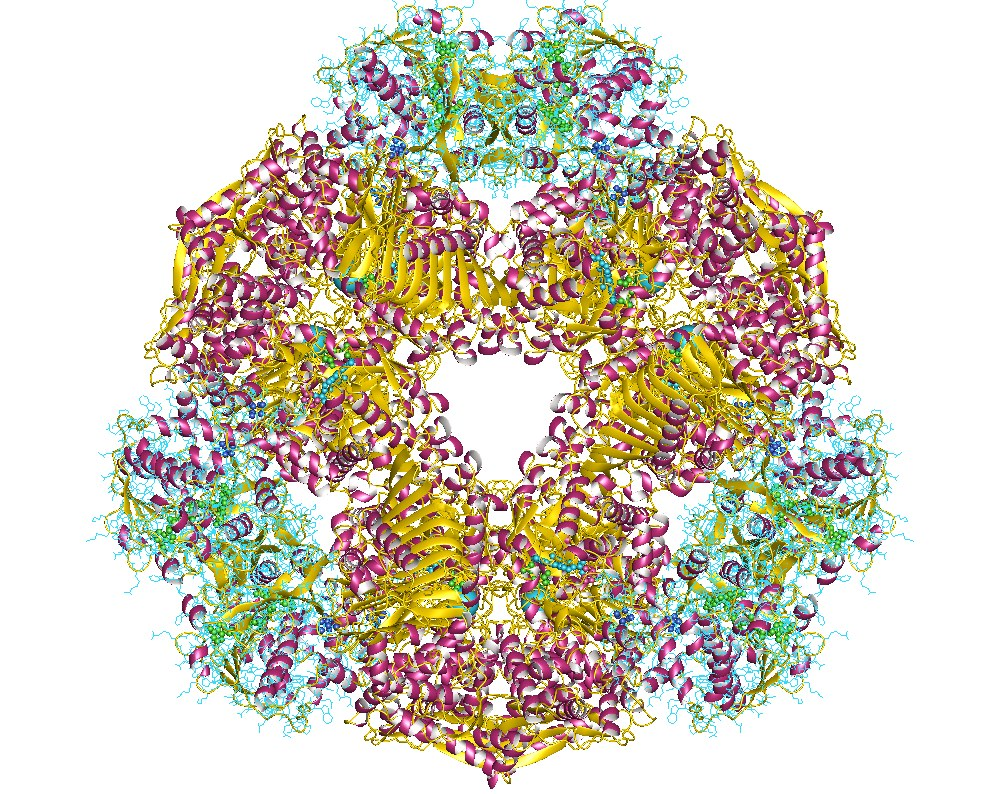
- Glutamate synthase dodekamer, Azospirillum br.

Identifiers
- EC no.: 1.4.1.13
- CAS no.: 37213-53-9

Databases
- BRENDA: enzyme data
- ExPASy: NiceZyme view
- KEGG: enzyme entry
- MetaCyc: metabolic pathway
- Rhea: reactions
- PDB structures: RCSB PDB PDBe PDBsum
- Gene Ontology: AmiGO / QuickGO
Search
- PMC: articles
- PubMed: articles
- NCBI: proteins

In enzymology, a glutamate synthase (NADPH) (EC 1.4.1.13) is an enzyme that catalyzes the chemical reaction

L-Glutamine
+
2-oxoglutarate
+ NADPH
H^{+}
2
L-Glutamic acid
+ NADP^{+}

The four substrates of this enzyme are L-glutamine, 2-oxoglutarate (α-ketoglutarate), NADPH, and H^{+}. They are converted to the products L-glutamamic acid and NADP^{+}.

This enzyme belongs to the family of oxidoreductases, specifically those acting on the CH-NH2 group of donors with NAD+ or NADP+ as acceptor. This enzyme participates in glutamate metabolism and nitrogen metabolism. It has 5 cofactors: FAD, Iron, FMN, Sulfur, and Iron-sulfur.

It occurs in bacteria and plants but not animals, and is important as it provides glutamate for the glutamine synthetase reaction.

== Nomenclature ==
The systematic name of this enzyme class is L-glutamate:NADP+ oxidoreductase (transaminating). Other names in common use include:

- glutamate (reduced nicotinamide adenine dinucleotide phosphate), synthase,
- glutamate synthase (NADPH),
- glutamate synthetase (NADP),
- glutamine amide-2-oxoglutarate aminotransferase (oxidoreductase, NADP),
- glutamine-ketoglutaric aminotransferase,
- L-glutamate synthase,
- L-glutamate synthetase,
- L-glutamine:2-oxoglutarate aminotransferase, NADPH oxidizing,
- NADPH-dependent glutamate synthase,
- NADPH-glutamate synthase, and
- NADPH-linked glutamate synthase.

== Structural studies ==
As of late 2007, only one structure has been solved for this class of enzymes, with the PDB accession code PDB: 1EA0.

== See also ==
- Glutamate synthase (NADH)
- Glutamate synthase (ferredoxin)
