= Glutamate synthase (ferredoxin) =

glutamate synthase (ferredoxin)

Identifiers
- EC no.: 1.4.7.1
- CAS no.: 62213-56-3

Databases
- BRENDA: enzyme data
- ExPASy: NiceZyme view
- KEGG: enzyme entry
- MetaCyc: metabolic pathway
- Rhea: reactions
- PDB structures: RCSB PDB PDBe PDBsum
- Gene Ontology: AmiGO / QuickGO
Search
- PMC: articles
- PubMed: articles
- NCBI: proteins

In enzymology, glutamate synthase (ferredoxin) (EC 1.4.7.1) is an enzyme that catalyzes the chemical reaction

2
L-glutamic acid
+ 2 oxidised
ferredoxin
2 H^{+}
2 H^{+}
Glutamine
+
α-Ketoglutaric acid
+ 2 reduced
ferredoxin

The two substrates of this enzyme are L-glutamic acid and oxidised ferredoxin. Its products are L-glutamine, α-ketoglutaric acid, reduced ferredoxin, and two protons.

== Classification ==
This enzyme belongs to the family of oxidoreductases, specifically those acting on the CH-NH_{2} group of donors with an iron-sulfur protein as acceptor.

== Nomenclature ==
The systematic name of this enzyme class is L-glutamate:ferredoxin oxidoreductase (transaminating). Other names in common use include:

- ferredoxin-dependent glutamate synthase,
- ferredoxin-glutamate synthase,
- glutamate synthase (ferredoxin-dependent), and
- ferredoxin-glutamine oxoglutarate aminotransferase (Fd-GOGAT).

== Biological role ==
This enzyme participates in nitrogen metabolism. It has 5 cofactors: flavin adenine dinucleotide, iron, sulfur, iron-sulfur, and flavoprotein.

== See also ==
- Glutamate synthase (NADH)
- Glutamate synthase (NADPH)
