= Diaminopimelate decarboxylase =

Class of enzymes

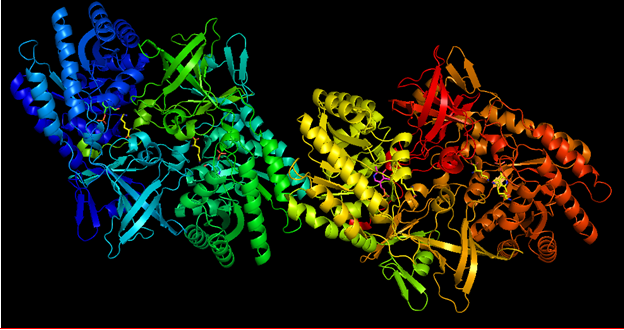
- A cartoon of Methanococcus jannaschii diaminopimelate decarboxylase

Identifiers
- EC no.: 4.1.1.20
- CAS no.: 9024-75-3

Databases
- BRENDA: enzyme data
- ExPASy: NiceZyme view
- KEGG: enzyme entry
- MetaCyc: metabolic pathway
- Rhea: reactions
- PDB structures: RCSB PDB PDBe PDBsum
- Gene Ontology: AmiGO / QuickGO
Search
- PMC: articles
- PubMed: articles
- NCBI: proteins

The enzyme diaminopimelate decarboxylase (EC 4.1.1.20), also known as diaminopimelic acid decarboxylase, DAPDC, meso-diaminopimelate decarboxylase, DAP-decarboxylase, and meso-2,6-diaminoheptanedioate carboxy-lyase, catalyzes the cleavage of a carbon-carbon bond in meso-diaminopimelate to produce L-lysine and carbon dioxide:

meso-diaminopimelic acid
CO_{2}
L-lysine

It uses pyridoxal phosphate as a cofactor and is classified as a lyase, specifically a carboxy-lyase, which cleave carbon-carbon bonds. The systematic name of this enzyme class is meso-2,6-diaminoheptanedioate carboxy-lyase (L-lysine-forming). DAP-decarboxylase catalyzes the final step in the meso-diaminopimelate/lysine biosynthetic pathway. Lysine is used for protein synthesis and used in the peptidoglycan layer of Gram-positive bacteria cell walls. This enzyme is not found in humans, but the ortholog is ornithine decarboxylase.

== Structure ==
DAPDC is a PLP-dependent enzyme belonging to the alanine racemase family. This enzyme is generally dimeric with each monomer containing two domains. The first domain is the N-terminal α/β-barrel that binds the PLP to the active site lysine residue. The second domain is the C-terminal β-sandwich. The active site is formed from residues present in both domains resulting in two active sites within the dimer.

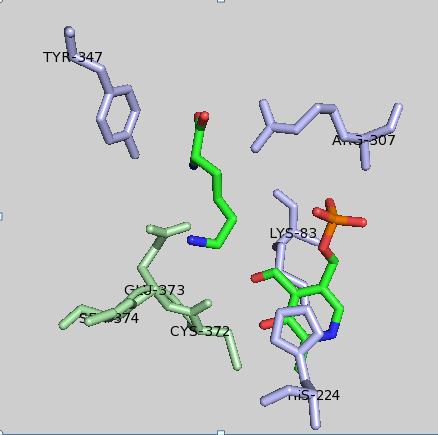
A cartoon diagram of the active site bound to PLP and the product, L-lysine. Lysine forms a Schiff base with PLP, while histidine stabilizes the formation.

DAPDC is stereochemically specific due to the opposing chiralities at each terminus of diaminopimelate. In order for the L-lysine to be generated over D-lysine, decarboxylation must occur at the D-terminus. Whether DAPDC recognizes the terminus or not is dependent on the formation of a Schiff base with PLP.

While the majority of DAPDC found in various species of bacteria have the same basic components, not all species follow the same structure. Some species of bacteria, such as Mycobacterium tuberculosis have been observed as a tetramer. The tetramer is shaped like a ring with the active sites accessible from the inside of the enzyme.

== Mechanism ==
The first step in the mechanism is the formation of a Schiff base with the substrate amino group. The lysine residue binding PLP to the structure is replaced by diaminopimelate. DAPDC then uses the interaction of 3 residues (Arginine, Aspartate, and Glutamate) within the active site to identify the D-stereocenter. The DAP is decarboxylated and then stabilized by PLP. It is not clear which general acid protonates after decarboxylation, but there is speculation that the lysine residue is the donor.

== Regulation ==
DAPDC is regulated by the product L-lysine at relatively high concentrations. Compounds that are similar to DAP in chemical complexity do not inhibit the reaction, possibly due to the residue rulers creating specific bond angles. Diamines have a stronger inhibitory effect compared to dicarboxylic acids, most likely from interactions with PLP.

== Function ==
Given that there are three pathways to convert aspartate to lysine, this is clearly an essential process for the cell, particularly in building cell walls in Gram-positive bacteria. There is no process for producing lysine in humans, but ornithine decarboxylase shares many similarities with DAPDC. Both enzymes use PLP as a cofactor and have similar structures forming the active sites. However, DAPDC differs in that it decarboxylates at the D-stereocenter and is highly stereospecific. These unique features make DAPDC a good candidate for antibacterial studies because potential inhibitors of such an integral step in cell viability would be unlikely to interact with necessary processes within humans.
