= Ribonucleoside-triphosphate reductase =

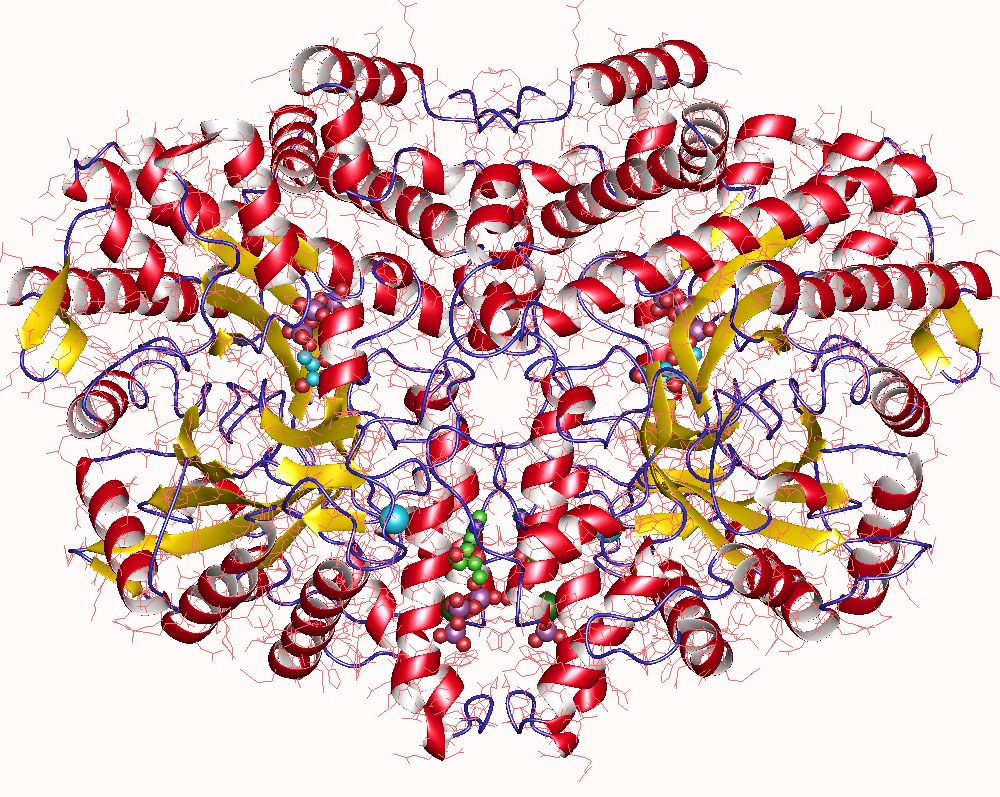
- Ribonucleoside-triphosphate reductase dimer, Thermotoga maritima

Identifiers
- EC no.: 1.17.4.2
- CAS no.: 9068-66-0

Databases
- IntEnz: IntEnz view
- BRENDA: BRENDA entry
- ExPASy: NiceZyme view
- KEGG: KEGG entry
- MetaCyc: metabolic pathway
- PRIAM: profile
- PDB structures: RCSB PDB PDBe PDBsum
Search
- PMC: articles
- PubMed: articles
- NCBI: proteins

Ribonucleoside-triphosphate reductase (EC 1.17.4.2, ribonucleotide reductase, 2'-deoxyribonucleoside-triphosphate:oxidized-thioredoxin 2'-oxidoreductase) is an enzyme with systematic name 2'-deoxyribonucleoside-triphosphate:thioredoxin-disulfide 2'-oxidoreductase. This enzyme catalyses the following chemical reaction

2'-deoxyribonucleoside triphosphate + thioredoxin disulfide + H_{2}O $\rightleftharpoons$ ribonucleoside triphosphate + thioredoxin

Ribonucleoside-triphosphate reductase requires a cobamide coenzyme and ATP.
