= Asd RNA motif =

Structure in lactic-acid bacterium RNA

asd RNA motif
- Consensus secondary structure of asd RNAs. The stem marked "terminator" is predicted as a Rho-independent transcription terminator.

Identifiers
- Symbol: asd RNA
- Rfam: RF01732

Other data
- RNA type: sRNA
- Domain: Streptococcaceae
- SO: 0000655
- PDB structures: PDBe

The asd RNA motif is a conserved RNA structure found in certain lactic acid bacteria. The asd motif was detected by bioinformatics and an individual asd RNA in Streptococcus pyogenes was detected by microarray and northern hybridization experiments as a 170-nucleotide molecule called "SR914400". The transcription start site determined for SR914400 corresponds to the 5′-end of the molecule shown in the consensus diagram.

Some asd RNA are associated with genes, such as asd, that are suggestive of a cis-regulatory function. However, several lines of evidence suggest that this is not the biological role of asd RNAs. First, in some cases, the asd RNA is not in the 5' untranslated region of any annotated gene. Second, in Streptococcus mutans, there is a strong promoter immediately downstream of the transcription terminator that follows the asd RNA, and this promoter precedes the downstream gene. This arrangement suggests that asd RNA transcription is terminated, and the gene is transcribed from the downstream promoter. Finally, although the asd gene encodes an enzyme, aspartate-semialdehyde dehydrogenase, that participates in the synthesis of methionine, lysine and threonine, transcription levels of the asd gene remain constant even when the concentrations of these amino acids are varied.

The sRNA was shown to interact with the 5'UTR of the mga transcript (the multiple virulence gene regulator gene) and was renamed MarS for mag-activating regulatory sRNA. In MarS deletion strains expression of mga and several Mga-activated genes is reduced. This down-regulation of virulence factors leads to increased susceptibility of the deletion strain to phagocytosis, reduced adherence to human keratinocytes. However, the lack of MarS increased bacterial dissemination and tolerance towards oxidative stress.
