= Tetrahydrodipicolinate N-acetyltransferase =

Identifiers
- EC no.: 2.3.1.89
- CAS no.: 83588-91-4

Databases
- IntEnz: IntEnz view
- BRENDA: BRENDA entry
- ExPASy: NiceZyme view
- KEGG: KEGG entry
- MetaCyc: metabolic pathway
- PRIAM: profile
- PDB structures: RCSB PDB PDBe PDBsum
- Gene Ontology: AmiGO / QuickGO
Search
- PMC: articles
- PubMed: articles
- NCBI: proteins

Tetrahydrodipicolinate N-acetyltransferase (EC 2.3.1.89) is an enzyme that catalyzes the chemical reaction

2,3,4,5-tetrahydrodipicolinic acid
+
acetyl-CoA
H_{2}O
2-acetamido-6-oxopimelic acid
+ coenzyme A

The three substrates of this enzyme are the (S)- enantiomer of 2,3,4,5-tetrahydrodipicolinic acid, acetyl-CoA, and water. Its products are (S)-2-acetamido-6-oxopimelic acid and coenzyme A.

This enzyme belongs to the family of transferases, specifically those acyltransferases transferring groups other than aminoacyl groups. The systematic name of this enzyme class is acetyl-CoA:(S)-2,3,4,5-tetrahydropyridine-2,6-dicarboxylate N2-acetyltransferase. Other names in common use include tetrahydrodipicolinate acetylase, tetrahydrodipicolinate:acetyl-CoA acetyltransferase, acetyl-CoA:L-2,3,4,5-tetrahydrodipicolinate N2-acetyltransferase, acetyl-CoA:(S)-2,3,4,5-tetrahydropyridine-2,6-dicarboxylate, and 2-N-acetyltransferase. This enzyme participates in lysine biosynthesis in Bacillus megaterium.
