= 4-hydroxy-tetrahydrodipicolinate reductase =

InterPro Family

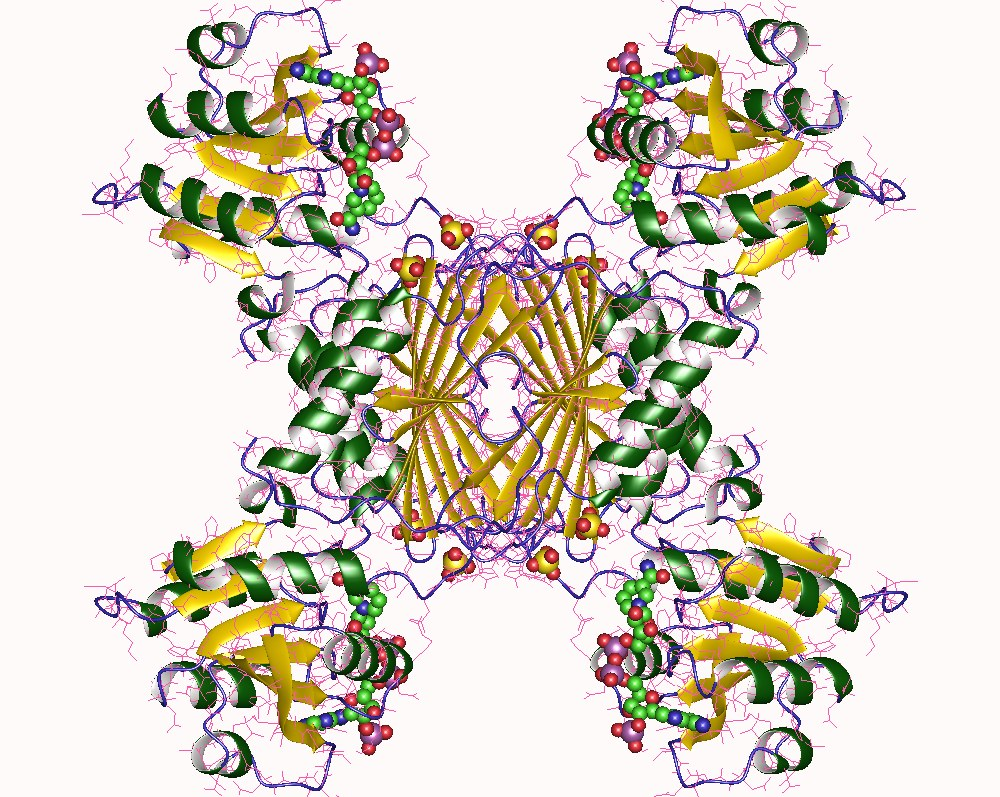
- Dihydrodipicolinate reductase tetramer, Corynebacterium glutamicum

Identifiers
- EC no.: 1.17.1.8
- CAS no.: 9055-46-3

Databases
- IntEnz: IntEnz view
- BRENDA: BRENDA entry
- ExPASy: NiceZyme view
- KEGG: KEGG entry
- MetaCyc: metabolic pathway
- PRIAM: profile
- PDB structures: RCSB PDB PDBe PDBsum
- Gene Ontology: AmiGO / QuickGO
Search
- PMC: articles
- PubMed: articles
- NCBI: proteins

4-hydroxy-tetrahydrodipicolinate reductase (EC 1.17.1.8) is an enzyme that catalyzes the chemical reaction

(2S,4S)-4-hydroxy-2,3,4,5-tetrahydrodipicolinic acid
+ NADH
H^{+}
H_{2}O
(S)-2,3,4,5-tetrahydrodipicolinic acid
+ NAD^{+}

The three substrates of this enzyme are (2S,4S)-4-hydroxy-2,3,4,5-tetrahydrodipicolinic acid, reduced nicotinamide adenine dinucleotide (NADH), and a proton. Its products are (S)-2,3,4,5-tetrahydrodipicolinic acid], oxidised NAD^{+} and water. Nicotinamide adenine dinucleotide phosphate can be used as an alternative cofactor.

This enzyme is part of the biosynthesis pathway to lysine.

== Nomenclature ==
This enzyme belongs to the family of oxidoreductases, specifically those acting on CH or CH_{2} groups with NAD^{+} or NADP^{+} as acceptor. The systematic name of this enzyme class is (S)-2,3,4,5-tetrahydropyridine-2,6-dicarboxylate:NAD(P)+ 4-oxidoreductase. Other names in common use include:

- dihydrodipicolinate reductase,
- dihydrodipicolinic acid reductase, and
- 2,3,4,5-tetrahydrodipicolinate:NAD(P)+ oxidoreductase.
