= ASD (database) =

Directory of allosteric proteins' structure

AlloSteric Database

Content
- Description: ASD: a comprehensive database of allosteric proteins and modulators.

Contact
- Research center: Shanghai Jiao Tong University School of Medicine
- Laboratory: Molecular Design Laboratory, Department of Pathophysiology
- Primary citation: PMID 21051350
- Release date: 2012

Access
- Website: mdl.shsmu.edu.cn/ASD/

Allosteric Database (ASD) provides a central resource for the display, search, and analysis of the structure, function, and related annotation for allosteric molecules.

Allostery is the most direct and efficient way for the regulation of biological macromolecule function induced by the binding of a ligand at an allosteric site topographically distinct from the orthosteric site. Due to the inherent high receptor selectivity and lower target-based toxicity, it is also expected to play a more positive role in drug discovery and bioengineering, leading to rapid growth in allosteric findings.

As of 2023, ASD contains allosteric proteins from 425 species and modulators in three main categories (activators, inhibitors, and regulators). Each protein is annotated with a detailed description of allostery, biological process, and related diseases, and each modulator with binding affinity, physicochemical properties, and therapeutic area. Integrating information from allosteric proteins in ASD should allow the prediction of allostery for unknown proteins, eventually making them ideal targets for experimental validation. In addition, modulators curated in ASD can be used to investigate potent allosteric targets for the query compound, and also help chemists implement structure modifications for novel allosteric drug designs. Therefore, ASD could be a platform and a starting point for biologists and medicinal chemists to further allosteric research.
