= Antiseptic Dorogov's Stimulator =

Antiseptic drug

Antiseptic Dorogov's Stimulator (Russian: АСД, антисептик-стимулятор Дорогова, ASD) is an antiseptic drug invented by A. V. Dorogov in the 1940s in the former USSR.

== History ==
ASD was originally invented by Russian researcher A. V. Dorogov in the 1940s and initially kept secret and allowed only for army and special services use. Since the 1990s it has been produced in a biochemical factory in Armavir and registered in Russia as official drug for animal-only usage and recommended for skin diseases in pigs and cows.

== Properties and production ==
Attributed strong anti-carcinogenic and anti-viral properties, the production process is described as "thermal processing of animal-origin tissues." The final product is a dark fluid with a very strong and specific odour. Available in two fractions - "third", denser, is to be administered on skin, "second" fraction - orally.

== See also ==
- Drug policy of the Soviet Union

== Literature ==
- Nauka i Zhizn; The All-Union Society for the Dissemination of Political and Scientific Knowledge, All-Union Society "Knowledge" (1951). Наука и жизнь [Science and Life, issues 5-12] (in Russian). Изд-во Академии наук СССР (Publishing House of the USSR Academy of Sciences). p. 19.
- Trudy Vsesouznogo instituta eksperimantalnoy veterenarii; Institute of Experimental Veterinary (1968). Труды Всесоюзного института экспериментальной ветеринарии [Volume 35] (in Russian). Изд-во Всесоюзного института экспериментальной ветеринарии (Publishing House of the Institute of Experimental Veterinary). pp. 326–339.
