= American School of Douala =

Coordinates: 4.0226°N 9.7034°E

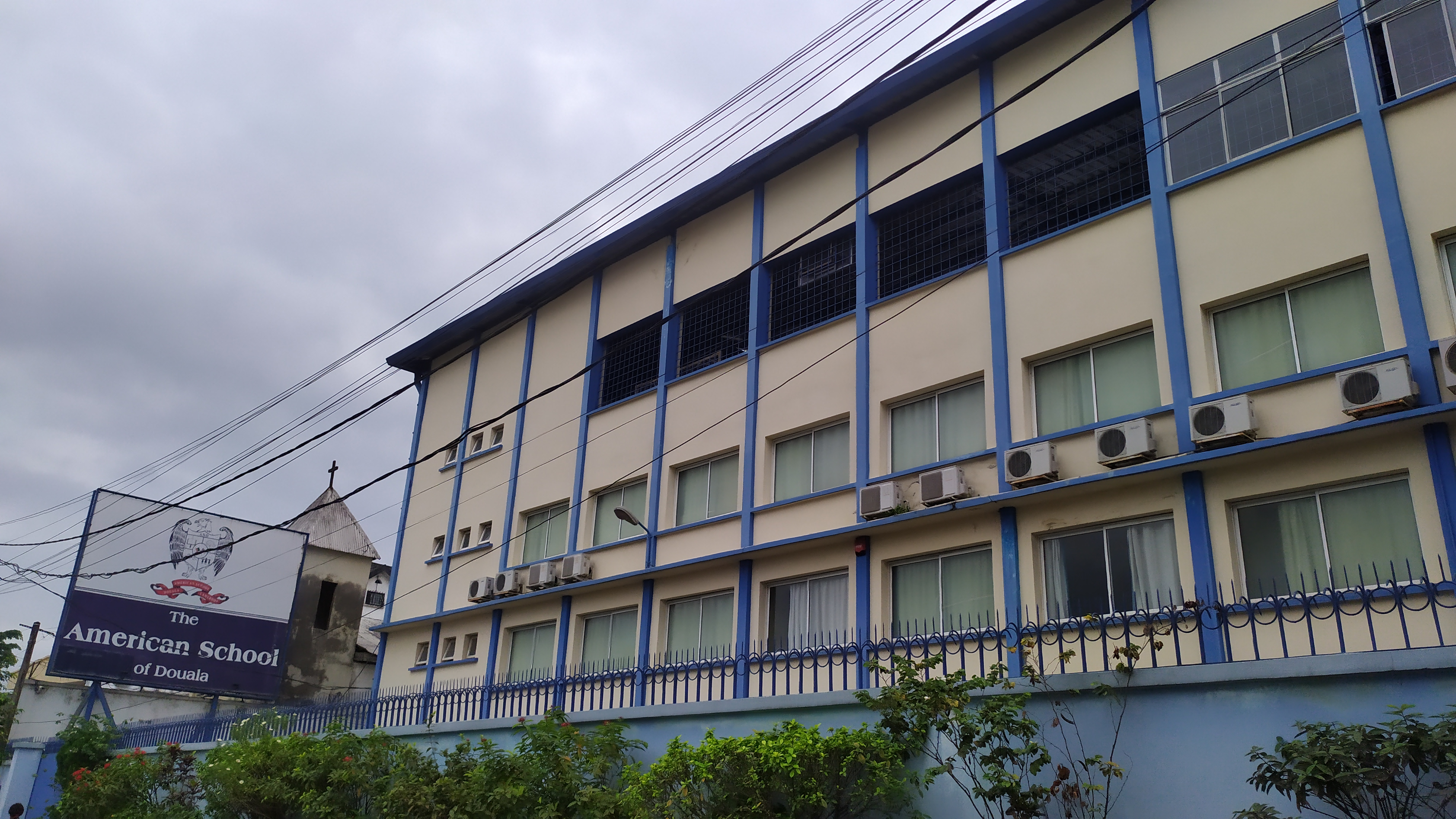

Location
- Douala; Cameroon

Information
- Established: 1978; 47 years ago
- Grades: Preschool - Grade 12
- Website: https://asddouala.com/

American School of Douala (ASD) is an American international school in Douala, Cameroon. It serves preschool through grade 12 and was established in 1978. It is located at Avenue des Palmiers in Bonapriso, a luxury residential neighborhood in Douala
