= 2,3,4,5-tetrahydropyridine-2,6-dicarboxylate N-succinyltransferase =

Class of enzymes

Identifiers
- EC no.: 2.3.1.117
- CAS no.: 88086-34-4

Databases
- IntEnz: IntEnz view
- BRENDA: BRENDA entry
- ExPASy: NiceZyme view
- KEGG: KEGG entry
- MetaCyc: metabolic pathway
- PRIAM: profile
- PDB structures: RCSB PDB PDBe PDBsum
- Gene Ontology: AmiGO / QuickGO
Search
- PMC: articles
- PubMed: articles
- NCBI: proteins

2,3,4,5-tetrahydropyridine-2,6-dicarboxylate N-succinyltransferase (EC 2.3.1.117) is an enzyme that catalyzes the chemical reaction

(1)
+
succinyl-CoA
H_{2}O
(2)
+ coenzyme A

The three substrates of this enzyme characterised from Escherichia coli are the (S) enantiomer of 2,3,4,5-tetrahydrodipicolinic acid (1), succinyl-CoA, and water. Its products are (S)-2-succinylamino-6-oxoheptanedioic acid (2) and coenzyme A.

This enzyme belongs to the family of transferases, specifically those acyltransferases transferring groups other than aminoacyl groups. The systematic name of this enzyme class is succinyl-CoA:(S)-2,3,4,5-tetrahydropyridine-2,6-dicarboxylate N-succinyltransferase. Other names in common use include tetrahydropicolinate succinylase, tetrahydrodipicolinate N-succinyltransferase, tetrahydrodipicolinate succinyltransferase, succinyl-CoA:tetrahydrodipicolinate N-succinyltransferase, succinyl-CoA:2,3,4,5-tetrahydropyridine-2,6-dicarboxylate, and N-succinyltransferase. This enzyme participates in lysine biosynthesis.

== Structural studies ==
As of late 2007, 4 structures have been solved for this class of enzymes, with PDB accession codes 1KGQ, 1KGT, 2TDT, and 3TDT.
