= N-acetyl-gamma-glutamyl-phosphate reductase =

Identifiers
- EC no.: 1.2.1.38
- CAS no.: 37251-00-6

Databases
- IntEnz: IntEnz view
- BRENDA: BRENDA entry
- ExPASy: NiceZyme view
- KEGG: KEGG entry
- MetaCyc: metabolic pathway
- PRIAM: profile
- PDB structures: RCSB PDB PDBe PDBsum
- Gene Ontology: AmiGO / QuickGO
Search
- PMC: articles
- PubMed: articles
- NCBI: proteins

In enzymology, N-acetyl-gamma-glutamyl-phosphate reductase (EC 1.2.1.38) is an enzyme that catalyzes the chemical reaction

N-acetyl-L-γ-glutamyl phosphate
+ NADPH
H^{+}
P_{i}
H^{+}
P_{i}
2-acetamido-5-oxopentanoic acid
+ NADP^{+}

The three substrates of this enzyme are N-acetyl-L-γ-glutamyl phosphate, reduced nicotinamide adenine dinucleotide phosphate (NADPH), and a proton. Its products are 2-acetamido-5-oxopentanoic acid, oxidised NADP^{+}, and inorganic phosphate (P_{i}).

This enzyme belongs to the family of oxidoreductases, specifically those acting on the aldehyde or oxo group of donor with NAD+ or NADP+ as acceptor. The systematic name of this enzyme class is N-acetyl-L-glutamate-5-semialdehyde:NADP+ 5-oxidoreductase (phosphorylating). Other names in common use include reductase, acetyl-gamma-glutamyl phosphate, N-acetylglutamate 5-semialdehyde dehydrogenase, N-acetylglutamic gamma-semialdehyde dehydrogenase, N-acetyl-L-glutamate gamma-semialdehyde:NADP+ oxidoreductase, and (phosphorylating). This enzyme participates in urea cycle and metabolism of amino groups.

== Structural studies ==
As of late 2007, 8 structures have been solved for this class of enzymes, with PDB accession codes 1VKN, 2CVO, 2G17, 2I3A, 2I3G, 2NQT, 2OZP, and 2Q49.
