= Phosphoribosylaminoimidazolecarboxamide formyltransferase =

Identifiers
- EC no.: 2.1.2.3
- CAS no.: 9032-03-5

Databases
- IntEnz: IntEnz view
- BRENDA: BRENDA entry
- ExPASy: NiceZyme view
- KEGG: KEGG entry
- MetaCyc: metabolic pathway
- PRIAM: profile
- PDB structures: RCSB PDB PDBe PDBsum
- Gene Ontology: AmiGO / QuickGO
Search
- PMC: articles
- PubMed: articles
- NCBI: proteins

Phosphoribosylaminoimidazolecarboxamide formyltransferase (EC 2.1.2.3), also known by the shorter name AICAR transformylase, is an enzyme that catalyzes the chemical reaction

AICA ribonucleotide
+ 10-CHO-THF
FAICAR
+ THF

This tetrahydrofolate–dependent enzyme catalyzes a nucleophilic acyl substitution of the formyl group from the cofactor 10-formyltetrahydrofolate (10-CHO-THF) to AICA ribonucleotide to give 5-formamidoimidazole-4-carboxamide ribotide (FAICAR). This reaction is involved in purine metabolism.

== Nomenclature ==
This enzyme belongs to the family of transferases that transfer one-carbon groups, specifically the hydroxymethyl-, formyl- and related transferases. The systematic name of this enzyme class is 10-formyltetrahydrofolate:5-phosphoribosyl-5-amino-4-imidazole-carboxamide N-formyltransferase. Other names in common use include:

- 10-formyltetrahydrofolate:5-phosphoribosyl-5-amino-4-imidazolecarboxamide formyltransferase
- 5-amino-1-ribosyl-4-imidazolecarboxamide 5-phosphate,
- 5-amino-4-imidazolecarboxamide ribonucleotide transformylase,
- 5-amino-4-imidazolecarboxamide ribotide transformylase,
- 5-phosphoribosyl-5-amino-4-imidazolecarboxamide formyltransferase,
- AICAR formyltransferase,
- AICAR transformylase,
- aminoimidazolecarboxamide ribonucleotide transformylase, and
- transformylase,
- bifunctional purine biosynthesis protein PURH,
- ATIC.

== Structural studies ==
As of late 2007, 11 structures have been solved for this class of enzymes, with PDB accession codes 1G8M, 1M9N, 1OZ0, 1P4R, 1PKX, 1PL0, 1THZ, 2B1G, 2B1I, 2IU0, and 2IU3.
