= Acetylglutamate kinase =

Class of enzymes

Identifiers
- EC no.: 2.7.2.8
- CAS no.: 9027-58-1

Databases
- IntEnz: IntEnz view
- BRENDA: BRENDA entry
- ExPASy: NiceZyme view
- KEGG: KEGG entry
- MetaCyc: metabolic pathway
- PRIAM: profile
- PDB structures: RCSB PDB PDBe PDBsum
- Gene Ontology: AmiGO / QuickGO
Search
- PMC: articles
- PubMed: articles
- NCBI: proteins

Acetylglutamate kinase (EC 2.7.2.8) is an enzyme that catalyzes the chemical reaction:

N-acetyl-L-glutamic acid
ATP
ADP
ATP
ADP
N-acetyl-L-γ-glutamyl phosphate

The enzyme characterised from the bacterium, Escherichia coli and the green algae, Chlamydomonas reinhardti, converts N-acetyl-L-glutamic acid to N-acetyl-L-γ-glutamyl phosphate by transferring a phosphate group from the cofactor, adenosine triphosphate (ATP), which is converted to adenosine diphosphate (ADP). The reaction is part of the biosynthesis of arginine.

This enzyme is a transferase, specifically one transferring phosphorus-containing groups (phosphotransferases) with a carboxy group as acceptor.

== Nomenclature ==
The systematic name of this enzyme class is ATP:N-acetyl-L-glutamate 5-phosphotransferase. Other names in common use include:

- N-acetylglutamate 5-phosphotransferase,
- acetylglutamate phosphokinase,
- N-acetylglutamate phosphokinase,
- N-acetylglutamate kinase, and
- N-acetylglutamic 5-phosphotransferase.

== Structural studies ==
As of late 2007, 9 structures have been solved for this class of enzymes, with PDB accession codes PDB: 1GS5, PDB: 1GSJ, PDB: 1OH9, PDB: 1OHA, PDB: 1OHB, PDB: 2AP9, PDB: 2BTY, PDB: 2BUF, and PDB: 2RD5.
