= Dihydrodipicolinate synthase =

Class of enzymes

4-hydroxy-tetrahydrodipicolinate synthase
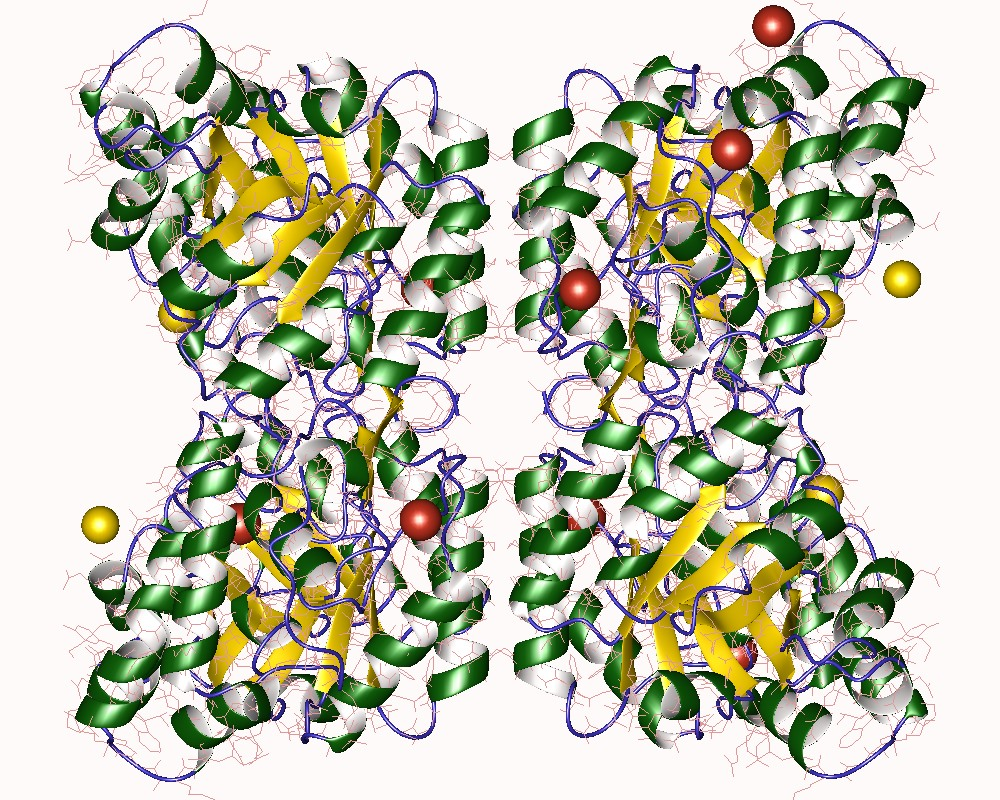
- Dihydrodipicolinate synthase homotetramer, Vitis vinifera

Identifiers
- EC no.: 4.3.3.7
- CAS no.: 9055-59-8

Databases
- BRENDA: enzyme data
- ExPASy: NiceZyme view
- KEGG: enzyme entry
- MetaCyc: metabolic pathway
- Rhea: reactions
- PDB structures: RCSB PDB PDBe PDBsum
- Gene Ontology: AmiGO / QuickGO
Search
- PMC: articles
- PubMed: articles
- NCBI: proteins

Dihydrodipicolinate synthetase family
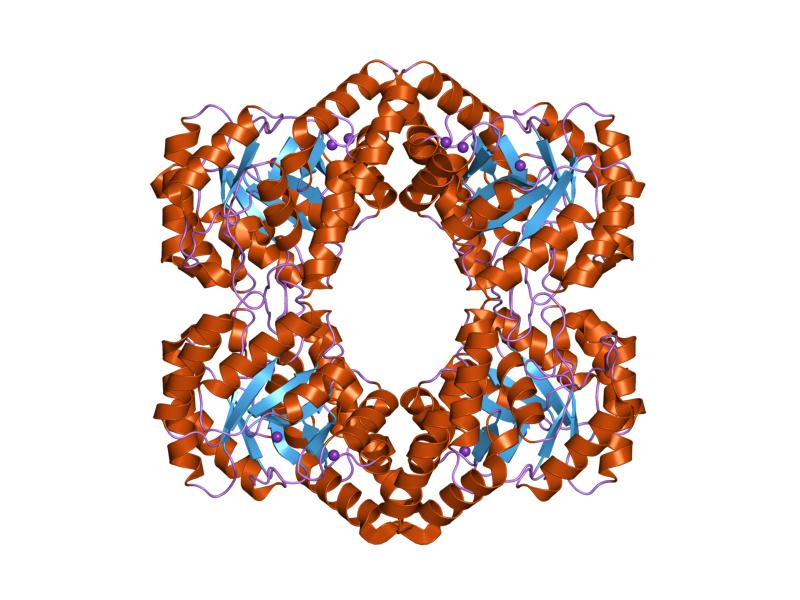
- Crystal structure of dihydrodipicolinate synthase dapa-2 (ba3935) from Bacillus anthracis at 1.94a resolution.

Identifiers
- Symbol: DHDPS
- Pfam: PF00701
- Pfam clan: CL0036
- InterPro: IPR002220
- PROSITE: PDOC00569
- SCOP2: 1dhp / SCOPe / SUPFAM
- CDD: cd00950
Available protein structures:
- PDB: IPR002220 PF00701 (ECOD; PDBsum)
- AlphaFold: IPR002220; PF00701

4-Hydroxy-tetrahydrodipicolinate synthase (EC 4.3.3.7, dihydrodipicolinate synthase, dihydropicolinate synthetase, dihydrodipicolinic acid synthase, L-aspartate-4-semialdehyde hydro-lyase (adding pyruvate and cyclizing), dapA (gene)) is an enzyme with the systematic name L-aspartate-4-semialdehyde hydro-lyase (adding pyruvate and cyclizing; (4S)-4-hydroxy-2,3,4,5-tetrahydro-(2S)-dipicolinate-forming). This enzyme catalyses the following chemical reaction

pyruvate + L-aspartate-4-semialdehyde $\rightleftharpoons$ (2S,4S)-4-hydroxy-2,3,4,5-tetrahydrodipicolinate + H_{2}O

The reaction proceeds in three consecutive steps.

== Function ==
This enzyme belongs is a lyase, specifically an amine-lyases, which cleave carbon-nitrogen bonds. 4-Hydroxy-tetrahydrodipicolinate synthase catalyzes lysine biosynthesis via the diaminopimelate pathway of prokaryotes, some phycomycetes, and higher plants. The enzyme catalyses the condensation of L-aspartate-beta-semialdehyde and pyruvate to 4-hydroxy-tetrahydropicolinic acid via a ping-pong mechanism in which pyruvate binds to the enzyme by forming a Schiff base with a lysine residue.

== Related enzymes ==
Three other proteins are structurally related to this enzyme and probably also act via a similar catalytic mechanism. These are Escherichia coli N-acetylneuraminate lyase (EC 4.1.3.3) (protein NanA), which catalyses the condensation of N-acetyl-D-mannosamine and pyruvate to form N-acetylneuraminate; Rhizobium meliloti (Sinorhizobium meliloti) protein MosA, which is involved in the biosynthesis of the rhizopine 3-O-methyl-scyllo-inosamine; and E. coli hypothetical protein YjhH.

== Structure ==
The sequences of 4-hydroxy-tetrahydrodipicolinate synthase from different sources are well-conserved. The structure takes the form of a homotetramer, in which 2 monomers are related by an approximate 2-fold symmetry. Each monomer comprises 2 domains: an 8-fold α/β-barrel, and a C-terminal α-helical domain. The fold resembles that of N-acetylneuraminate lyase. The active site lysine is located in the barrel domain, and has access via 2 channels on the C-terminal side of the barrel.
