= 5-Formamidoimidazole-4-carboxamide ribotide =

Names
- IUPAC name (1R)-1,4-Anhydro-1-(4-carbamoyl-5-formamido-1H-imidazol-1-yl)-D-ribitol 5-(dihydrogen phosphate)
- Systematic IUPAC name [(2R,3S,4R,5R)-5-(4-Carbamoyl-5-formamido-1H-imidazol-1-yl)-3,4-dihydroxyoxolan-2-yl]methyl dihydrogen phosphate
- Other names 5-Formamidoimidazole-4-carboxamide ribonucleotide, FAICAR

Identifiers
CAS Number	13018-54-7
3D model (JSmol)	Interactive image; Interactive image
ChEBI	CHEBI:18381
ChEMBL	ChEMBL521310
ChemSpider	145893
MeSH	5-formamidoimidazole-4-carboxamide+ribotide
PubChem CID	166760
UNII	KNY2D67FT5
CompTox Dashboard (EPA)	DTXSID50156384
- InChI: InChI=1S/C10H15N4O9P/c11-8(18)5-9(13-3-15)14(2-12-5)10-7(17)6(16)4(23-10)1-22-24(19,20)21/h2-4,6-7,10,16-17H,1H2,(H2,11,18)(H,13,15)(H2,19,20,21)/t4-,6-,7-,10-/m1/s1 Key: ABCOOORLYAOBOZ-KQYNXXCUSA-N; InChI=1/C10H15N4O9P/c11-8(18)5-9(13-3-15)14(2-12-5)10-7(17)6(16)4(23-10)1-22-24(19,20)21/h2-4,6-7,10,16-17H,1H2,(H2,11,18)(H,13,15)(H2,19,20,21)/t4-,6-,7-,10-/m1/s1 Key: ABCOOORLYAOBOZ-KQYNXXCUBS
- SMILES: C1=NC(=C(N1[C@H]2[C@@H]([C@@H]([C@H](O2)COP(=O)(O)O)O)O)NC=O)C(=O)N; O=P(O)(O)OC[C@H]2O[C@@H](n1cnc(C(=O)N)c1NC=O)[C@H](O)[C@@H]2O

Properties
Chemical formula	C_{10}H_{15}N_{4}O_{9}P
Molar mass	366.223 g·mol^{−1}
- Except where otherwise noted, data are given for materials in their standard state (at 25 °C [77 °F], 100 kPa). verify (what is ?) Infobox references

5-Formamidoimidazole-4-carboxamide ribotide (or FAICAR) is an intermediate in the formation of purines. It is formed by the enzyme AICAR transformylase from AICAR and 10-formyltetrahydrofolate.
