= AICA ribonucleotide =

Names
- IUPAC name (1R)-1-(5-Amino-4-carbamoyl-1H-imidazol-1-yl)-1,4-anhydro-D-ribitol 5-(dihydrogen phosphate)
- Systematic IUPAC name [(2R,3S,4R,5R)-5-(5-Amino-4-carbamoyl-1H-imidazol-1-yl)-3,4-dihydroxyoxolan-2-yl]methyl dihydrogen phosphate
- Other names AICAR, Aminoimidazole carboxamide ribonucleotide, AICA ribonucleotide, ZMP, 5-Amino-1-β-D-ribofuranosyl-imidazole-4-carboxamide

Identifiers
CAS Number	3031-94-5
3D model (JSmol)	Interactive image
ChEBI	CHEBI:18406
ChEMBL	ChEMBL483849
ChemSpider	58620
ECHA InfoCard	100.019.285
KEGG	C04677
MeSH	AICA+ribonucleotide
PubChem CID	65110
UNII	F0X88YW0YK
CompTox Dashboard (EPA)	DTXSID10904363
- InChI: InChI=1S/C9H15N4O8P/c10-7-4(8(11)16)12-2-13(7)9-6(15)5(14)3(21-9)1-20-22(17,18)19/h2-3,5-6,9,14-15H,1,10H2,(H2,11,16)(H2,17,18,19)/t3-,5-,6-,9-/m1/s1 Key: NOTGFIUVDGNKRI-UUOKFMHZSA-N; InChI=1/C9H15N4O8P/c10-7-4(8(11)16)12-2-13(7)9-6(15)5(14)3(21-9)1-20-22(17,18)19/h2-3,5-6,9,14-15H,1,10H2,(H2,11,16)(H2,17,18,19)/t3-,5-,6-,9-/m1/s1 Key: NOTGFIUVDGNKRI-UUOKFMHZBG
- SMILES: O=P(O)(O)OC[C@H]2O[C@@H](n1cnc(C(=O)N)c1N)[C@H](O)[C@@H]2O

Properties
Chemical formula	C_{9}H_{15}N_{4}O_{8}P
Molar mass	338.213 g·mol^{−1}
- Except where otherwise noted, data are given for materials in their standard state (at 25 °C [77 °F], 100 kPa). verify (what is ?) Infobox references

5-Aminoimidazole-4-carboxamide ribonucleotide (AICAR) is an intermediate in the generation of inosine monophosphate. AICAR is an analog of adenosine monophosphate (AMP) that is capable of stimulating AMP-dependent protein kinase (AMPK) activity. The drug has also been shown as a potential treatment for diabetes by increasing the metabolic activity of tissues by changing the physical composition of muscle. AICAR typically refers to AICA riboside, whereas ZMP refers to AICA ribotide.

== Mechanism of action ==
The nucleoside form of AICAR, acadesine, is an analog of adenosine that enters cardiac cells to inhibit adenosine kinase and adenosine deaminase. It enhances the rate of nucleotide re-synthesis increasing adenosine generation from adenosine monophosphate only during conditions of myocardial ischemia. In cardiac myocytes, acadesine is phosphorylated to AICAR to activate AMPK without changing the levels of the nucleotides. AICAR is able to enter the de novo synthesis pathway for adenosine synthesis to inhibit adenosine deaminase causing an increase in ATP levels and adenosine levels.

== Use as a performance-enhancing drug ==
In 2009, the French Anti-Doping Agency, suspected that AICAR had been used in the 2009 Tour de France for its supposed performance enhancing properties. Although a detection method was reportedly given to the World Anti-Doping Agency, it was unknown if this method was implemented. As of January 2011, AICAR was officially a banned substance in the World Anti Doping Code, and the standard levels in elite athletes have been determined, to interpret test results.

== See also ==
- Inosine monophosphate synthase
- Nicotinamide riboside
