= Diaminopimelic acid =

Names
- Preferred IUPAC name (2R,6S)-2,6-Diaminoheptanedioic acid

Identifiers
CAS Number	583-93-7
3D model (JSmol)	Interactive image
ChEBI	CHEBI:16488
ChEMBL	ChEMBL415306
ChemSpider	89700
ECHA InfoCard	100.008.660
IUPHAR/BPS	5021
MeSH	Diaminopimelic+acid
PubChem CID	1549101
UNII	V5KRL7N7GD
CompTox Dashboard (EPA)	DTXSID10862237
- InChI: InChI=1S/C7H14N2O4/c8-4(6(10)11)2-1-3-5(9)7(12)13/h4-5H,1-3,8-9H2,(H,10,11)(H,12,13)/t4-,5+ Key: GMKMEZVLHJARHF-SYDPRGILSA-N
- SMILES: O=C(O)[C@@H](N)CCC[C@@H](N)C(=O)O

Properties
Chemical formula	C_{7}H_{14}N_{2}O_{4}
Molar mass	190.20 g/mol
Appearance	white powder
Density	1.344 g/mL
Melting point	295 °C (563 °F; 568 K)
Boiling point	426.7 °C (800.1 °F; 699.8 K)

Hazards
- Occupational safety and health (OHS/OSH)
Main hazards	Irritant
- Except where otherwise noted, data are given for materials in their standard state (at 25 °C [77 °F], 100 kPa). verify (what is ?) Infobox references

Diaminopimelic acid (DAP) is an amino acid, representing an epsilon-carboxy derivative of lysine. meso-α,ε-Diaminopimelic acid is the last intermediate in the biosynthesis of lysine and undergoes decarboxylation by diaminopimelate decarboxylase to give the final product.

DAP is a characteristic of certain cell walls of some bacteria. DAP is often found in the peptide linkages of NAM-NAG chains that make up the cell wall of gram-negative bacteria. When provided, they exhibit normal growth. When in deficiency, they still grow but with the inability to make new cell wall peptidoglycan.

This is also the attachment point for Braun's lipoprotein.

== See also ==
- Aspartate-semialdehyde dehydrogenase, an enzyme involved in DAP synthesis
- Peptidoglycan
- Pimelic acid

== Images ==
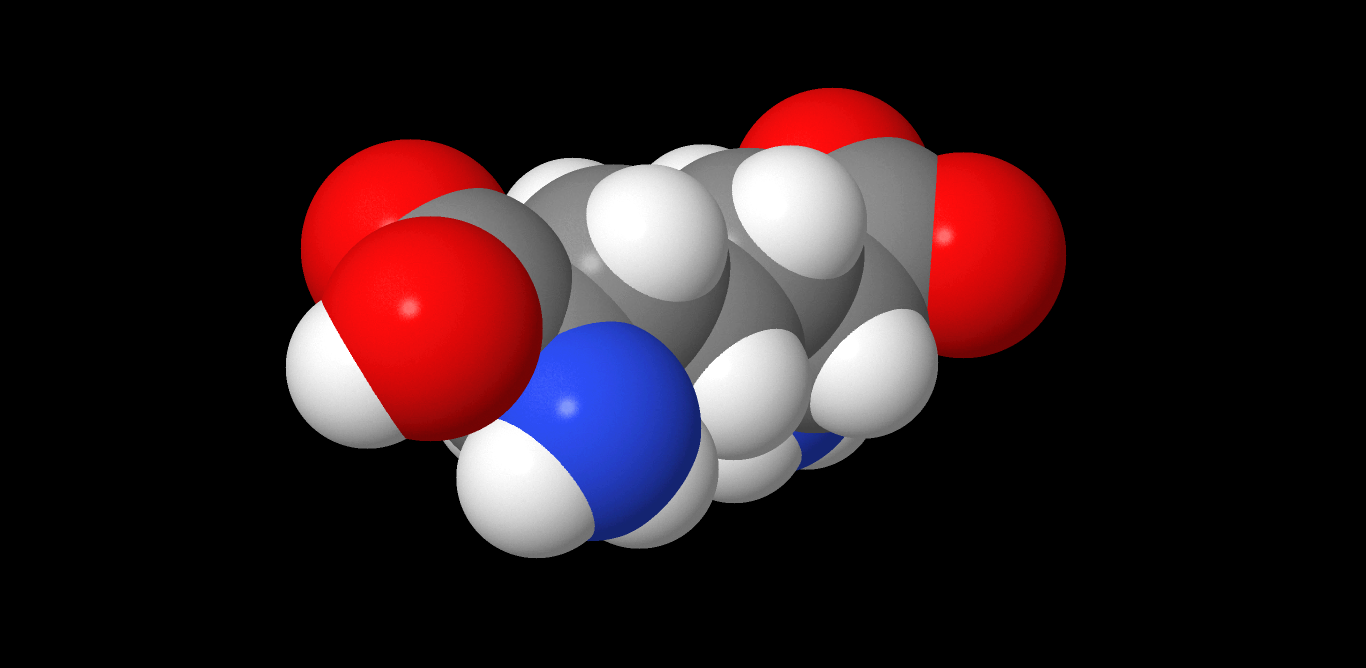
An alternate view of the DAP structure.
