= 5-Aminoimidazole ribotide =

Names
- IUPAC name 1-(5-Amino-1H-imidazol-1-yl)-1-deoxy-β-D-ribofuranose 5-(dihydrogen phosphate)
- Systematic IUPAC name [(2R,3S,4R,5R)-5-(5-Amino-1H-imidazol-1-yl)-3,4-dihydroxyoxolan-2-yl]methyl dihydrogen phosphate
- Other names AIR, [5-(5-amino-1-imidazolyl)-3,4-dihydroxy-2-tetrahydrofuranyl]methyl dihydrogen phosphate

Identifiers
CAS Number	25635-88-5
3D model (JSmol)	Interactive image
ChEBI	CHEBI:138560
ChemSpider	141854
KEGG	C03373
MeSH	aminoimidazole+ribotide
PubChem CID	161500
CompTox Dashboard (EPA)	DTXSID60948494
- InChI: InChI=1S/C8H14N3O7P/c9-5-1-10-3-11(5)8-7(13)6(12)4(18-8)2-17-19(14,15)16/h1,3-4,6-8,12-13H,2,9H2,(H2,14,15,16)/t4-,6-,7-,8-/m1/s1 Key: PDACUKOKVHBVHJ-XVFCMESISA-N
- SMILES: O=P(O)(O)OC[C@H]2O[C@@H](n1cncc1N)[C@H](O)[C@@H]2O

Properties
Chemical formula	C_{8}H_{14}N_{3}O_{7}P
Molar mass	295.186 g/mol
- Except where otherwise noted, data are given for materials in their standard state (at 25 °C [77 °F], 100 kPa). Infobox references

5′-Phosphoribosyl-5-aminoimidazole (or aminoimidazole ribotide, AIR) is a biochemical intermediate in the formation of purine nucleotides via inosine-5-monophosphate, and hence is a building block for DNA and RNA. The vitamins thiamine and cobalamin also contain fragments derived from AIR. It is an intermediate in the adenine pathway and is synthesized from 5′-phosphoribosylformylglycinamidine by AIR synthetase.

== Chemistry ==
5-aminoimidazole derivatives were considered unstable and therefore difficult to synthesize. The first non-enzymatic synthesis of 5-aminoimidazole ribotide (AIR) was only published in 1988 and general methodology for other examples was developed in the 1990s.

== Biosynthesis ==
The furanose (5-carbon) sugar in AIR comes from the pentose phosphate pathway, which converts glucose (as its 6-phosphate derivative) into ribose 5-phosphate (R5P). The subsequent reactions which attach the aminoimidazole portion of the molecule begin when R5P is activated as its pyrophosphate derivative, phosphoribosyl pyrophosphate (PRPP). This reaction is catalysed by ribose-phosphate diphosphokinase.

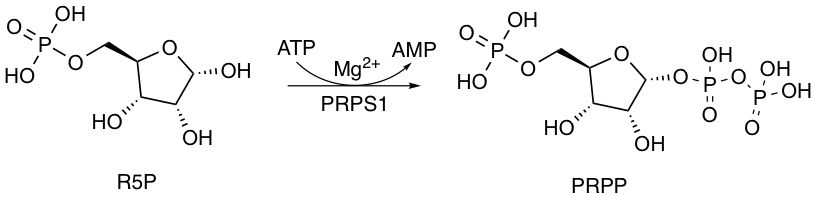

Five biosynthetic steps complete the transformation. The first enzyme, amidophosphoribosyltransferase, attaches ammonia from glutamine to the ribotide at its anomeric carbon, forming phosphoribosylamine (PRA):

PRPP + glutamine → PRA + glutamate + PPi

Next, PRA is converted to glycineamide ribonucleotide (GAR) by the action of phosphoribosylamine—glycine ligase, forming an amide bond with glycine in a process driven by ATP:

PRA + glycine + ATP → GAR + ADP + Pi

A third enzyme, phosphoribosylglycinamide formyltransferase, adds a formyl group from 10-formyltetrahydrofolate to GAR, giving phosphoribosyl-N-formylglycineamide (FGAR):

GAR + 10-formyltetrahydrofolate → FGAR + tetrahydrofolate

The penultimate step converts FGAR to an amidine by the action of phosphoribosylformylglycinamidine synthase, transferring an amino group from glutamine and giving 5′-phosphoribosylformylglycinamidine (FGAM) in a reaction that also requires ATP:

FGAR + ATP + glutamine + H_{2}O → FGAM + ADP + glutamate + Pi

FGAM is finally converted to AIR by the action of AIR synthetase which uses ATP to activate the terminal carbonyl group to attack by the nitrogen atom at the anomeric centre:

FGAM + ATP → AIR + ADP + Pi + H^{+}

== Use as an intermediate in biosynthesis ==
=== Purines ===
The purine ring system of the nucleotide inosine monophosphate is formed in a pathway from AIR that begins when phosphoribosylaminoimidazole carboxylase converts it to the carboxylated derivative in the imidazole ring, 5′-phosphoribosyl-4-carboxy-5-aminoimidazole (CAIR).

AIR + CO_{2} → CAIR + 2 H^{+}

The same compound can be formed in a two-step pathway when the enzymes involved are 5-(carboxyamino)imidazole ribonucleotide synthase and 5-(carboxyamino)imidazole ribonucleotide mutase.

=== Radical SAM reactions ===
Rearrangement reactions starting from AIR incorporate portions of the molecule into additional biochemical pathways. The enzymes involved are in the radical SAM superfamily of iron–sulfur proteins, which use S-adenosyl methionine as a cofactor to initiate the conversions via radical intermediates.

==== Thiamine ====
The vitamin thiamine contains a pyrimidine ring system which is formed from AIR in a reaction catalysed by phosphomethylpyrimidine synthase.

This reaction incorporates the blue, green and red fragments shown into the product, 4-amino-5-hydroxymethyl-2-methylpyrimidine phosphate.

==== 5-Hydroxybenzimidazole ====
In some anaerobes, AIR is a precursor to 5,6-dimethylbenzimidazole, which is incorporated into vitamin B_{12} in later steps of cobalamin biosynthesis. The initial reaction is catalysed by 5-hydroxybenzimidazole synthase, EC 4.1.99.23, and forms 5-hydroxybenzimidazole:

All the carbon atoms of the product are transferred from AIR, as shown.
