= Phosphoribosylaminoimidazole carboxylase =

Enzyme involved in purine synthesis

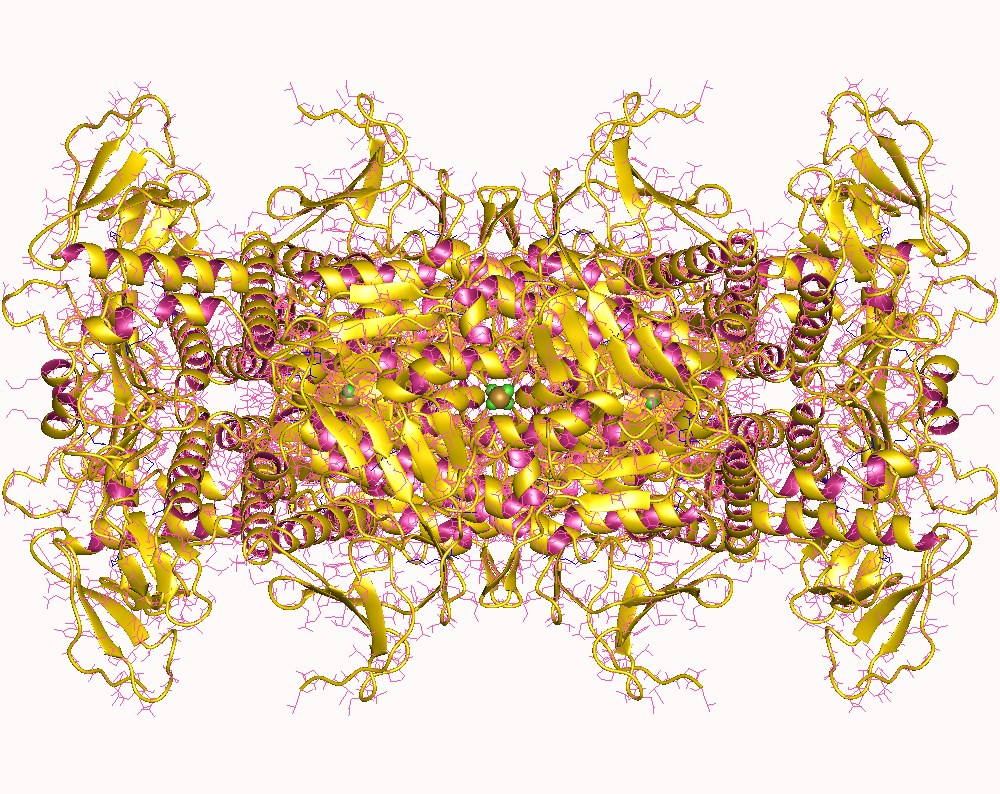
- Phosphoribosylaminoimidazole carboxylase octamer, Human

Identifiers
- EC no.: 4.1.1.21
- CAS no.: 9032-04-6

Databases
- BRENDA: enzyme data
- ExPASy: NiceZyme view
- KEGG: enzyme entry
- MetaCyc: metabolic pathway
- Rhea: reactions
- PDB structures: RCSB PDB PDBe PDBsum
- Gene Ontology: AmiGO / QuickGO
Search
- PMC: articles
- PubMed: articles
- NCBI: proteins

phosphoribosylaminoimidazole carboxylase and phosphoribosyl- aminoimidazolesuccinocarboxamide synthase

Identifiers
- Symbol: PAICS
- Alt. symbols: PAIS
- NCBI gene: 10606
- HGNC: 8587
- OMIM: 172439
- RefSeq: NM_006452
- UniProt: P22234

Other data
- Locus: Chr. 4 q12
Search for
- Structures: Swiss-model
- Domains: InterPro

The enzyme Phosphoribosylaminoimidazole carboxylase, or AIR carboxylase (EC 4.1.1.21) is involved in nucleotide biosynthesis and in particular in purine biosynthesis. It catalyzes the conversion of 5-aminoimidazole ribotide ("AIR") into 5′-phosphoribosyl-4-carboxy-5-aminoimidazole ("CAIR") by addition of a carboxylate group from carbon dioxide:

AIR
CO_{2}
CAIR

== In humans ==
The human PAICS gene is located on chromosome 4 at 4q12. It encodes a bifunctional enzyme that catalyzes steps 6 and 7 of de novo purine biosynthesis. Its AIR carboxylase domain converts AIR to CAIR, and its SAICAR synthetase domain uses CAIR, aspartate and ATP to form SAICAR.

== In plants and fungi ==
Phosphoribosylaminoimidazole carboxylase is a fusion protein in plants and fungi, but consists of two non-interacting proteins in bacteria, PurK and PurE.

The crystal structure of PurE indicates a unique quaternary structure that confirms the octameric nature of the enzyme.

== In Escherichia coli ==
In the bacterium Escherichia coli the reaction is catalyzed in two steps carried out by two separate enzymes, PurK and PurE.

PurK, N5-carboxyaminoimidazole ribonucleotide synthetase, catalyzes the conversion of 5-aminoimidazole ribonucleotide ("AIR"), ATP, and bicarbonate to N5-carboxyaminoimidazole ribonucleotide ("N5-CAIR"), ADP, and phosphate.

PurE, N5-carboxyaminoimidazole ribonucleotide mutase, converts N5-CAIR to CAIR, the sixth step of de novo purine biosynthesis. In the presence of high concentrations of bicarbonate, PurE is reported able to convert AIR to CAIR directly and without ATP. Some members of this family contain two copies of this domain.
