= 5′-Phosphoribosylformylglycinamidine =

Names
- IUPAC name [(2R,3S,4R,5R)-5-[(1-Amino-2-formamidoethylidene)amino]-3,4-dihydroxyoxolan-2-yl]methyl dihydrogen phosphate
- Other names FGAM

Identifiers
CAS Number	6157-85-3
3D model (JSmol)	Interactive image
ChemSpider	7830994
PubChem CID	5462266
UNII	F5S688KP9G
CompTox Dashboard (EPA)	DTXSID701027525
- InChI: InChI=1S/C8H16N3O8P/c9-5(1-10-3-12)11-8-7(14)6(13)4(19-8)2-18-20(15,16)17/h3-4,6-8,13-14H,1-2H2,(H2,9,11)(H,10,12)(H2,15,16,17)/t4-,6-,7-,8-/m1/s1 Key: PMCOGCVKOAOZQM-XVFCMESISA-N
- SMILES: C([C@@H]1[C@H]([C@H]([C@@H](O1)NC(=N)CNC=O)O)O)OP(=O)(O)O

Properties
Chemical formula	C_{8}H_{16}N_{3}O_{8}P
Molar mass	313.20 g/mol
- Except where otherwise noted, data are given for materials in their standard state (at 25 °C [77 °F], 100 kPa). Infobox references

5′-Phosphoribosylformylglycinamidine (or FGAM) is a biochemical intermediate in the formation of purine nucleotides via inosine-5-monophosphate, and hence is a building block for DNA and RNA. The vitamins thiamine and cobalamin also contain fragments derived from FGAM.

The compound is biosynthesized from phosphoribosyl-N-formylglycineamide (FGAR) which is converted to an amidine by the action of phosphoribosylformylglycinamidine synthase (EC 6.3.5.3), transferring an amino group from glutamine in a reaction that also requires ATP:

FGAR + ATP + glutamine + H_{2}O → FGAM + ADP + glutamate + Pi

The biosynthesis pathway next converts FGAM to 5-aminoimidazole ribotide (AIR) by the action of AIR synthetase (EC 6.3.3.1) which uses ATP to activate the terminal carbonyl group to attack by the nitrogen atom at the anomeric center:

FGAM + ATP → AIR + ADP + Pi + H^{+}

== See also ==
- Purine metabolism
