= IMPDH/GMPR family =

IMP dehydrogenase / GMP reductase domain
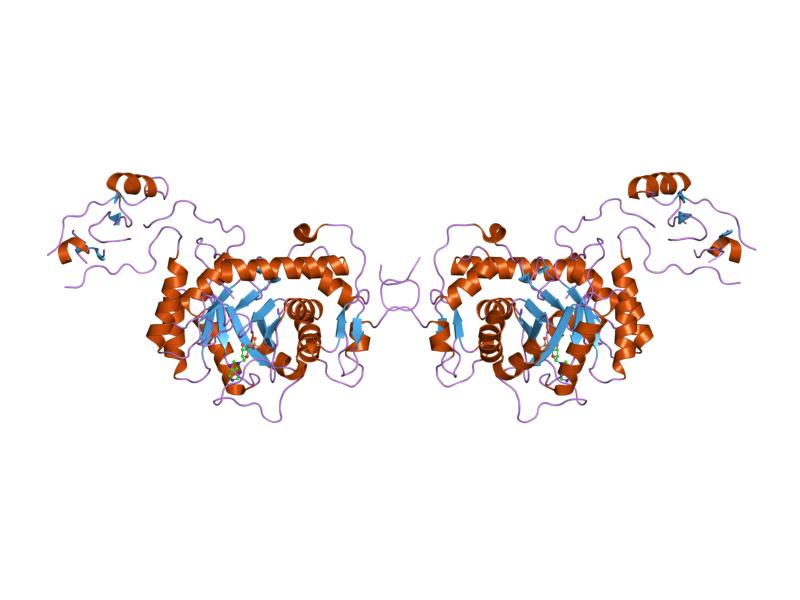
- binary complex of human type-i inosine monophosphate dehydrogenase with 6-cl-imp

Identifiers
- Symbol: IMPDH
- Pfam: PF00478
- Pfam clan: CL0036
- InterPro: IPR001093
- PROSITE: PDOC00391
- SCOP2: 1ak5 / SCOPe / SUPFAM
Available protein structures:
- PDB: IPR001093 PF00478 (ECOD; PDBsum)
- AlphaFold: IPR001093; PF00478

In molecular biology, the IMPDH/GMPR family of enzymes includes IMP dehydrogenase and GMP reductase. These enzymes are involved in purine metabolism. These enzymes adopt a TIM barrel structure.
