= Purine synthesis =

Purine synthesis may either refer to:

- in vivo purine synthesis: Purine metabolism#Biosynthesis
- laboratory purine synthesis: Purine#Laboratory synthesis
