= Ureidoglycolate lyase =

Class of enzymes

ureidoglycolate lyase

Identifiers
- EC no.: 4.3.2.3
- CAS no.: 9014-57-7

Databases
- IntEnz: IntEnz view
- BRENDA: BRENDA entry
- ExPASy: NiceZyme view
- KEGG: KEGG entry
- MetaCyc: metabolic pathway
- PRIAM: profile
- PDB structures: RCSB PDB PDBe PDBsum
- Gene Ontology: AmiGO / QuickGO
Search
- PMC: articles
- PubMed: articles
- NCBI: proteins

The enzyme ureidoglycolate lyase (EC 4.3.2.3) catalyzes the chemical reaction

(S)-ureidoglycolate $\rightleftharpoons$ glyoxylate + urea

This enzyme belongs to the family of lyases, specifically amidine lyases. The systematic name of this enzyme class is (S)-ureidoglycolate urea-lyase (glyoxylate-forming). Other names in common use include ureidoglycolatase, ureidoglycolase, ureidoglycolate hydrolase, and (S)-ureidoglycolate urea-lyase. This enzyme participates in purine metabolism.
