= Phosphoribosyltransferase =

Class of enzymes

A phosphoribosyltransferase is a type of transferase enzyme.

Types include:

- Adenine phosphoribosyltransferase
- Amidophosphoribosyltransferase
- Hypoxanthine-guanine phosphoribosyltransferase
- Orotate phosphoribosyltransferase
- Quinolinate phosphoribosyltransferase
- Uracil phosphoribosyltransferase
