= PFAS (disambiguation) =

PFAS or PFASs are per- and polyfluoroalkyl substances, a large class of synthetic chemicals.

PFAS or PFASS may also refer to:

- Oral allergy syndrome (pollen-food allergy syndrome)
- Phosphoribosylformylglycinamidine synthase, an enzyme
- Personal fall arrest system, in workplace safety
- Philadelphia Female Anti-Slavery Society
- Partial fetal alcohol syndrome
