= NAD+ pyrophosphorylase =

NAD+ pyrophosphorylase may refer to:

- Nicotinate-nucleotide diphosphorylase (carboxylating)
- Nicotinamide-nucleotide adenylyltransferase
