= Ureidoglycolate hydrolase =

Class of enzymes

ureidoglycolate hydrolase

Identifiers
- EC no.: 3.5.3.19
- CAS no.: 115629-07-7

Databases
- IntEnz: IntEnz view
- BRENDA: BRENDA entry
- ExPASy: NiceZyme view
- KEGG: KEGG entry
- MetaCyc: metabolic pathway
- PRIAM: profile
- PDB structures: RCSB PDB PDBe PDBsum
- Gene Ontology: AmiGO / QuickGO
Search
- PMC: articles
- PubMed: articles
- NCBI: proteins

In enzymology, an ureidoglycolate hydrolase (EC 3.5.3.19) is an enzyme that catalyzes the chemical reaction

(S)-ureidoglycolate + H_{2}O $\rightleftharpoons$ glyoxylate + 2 NH_{3} + CO_{2}

Thus, the two substrates of this enzyme are (S)-ureidoglycolate and H_{2}O, whereas its 3 products are glyoxylate, NH_{3}, and CO_{2}.

This enzyme belongs to the family of hydrolases, those acting on carbon-nitrogen bonds other than peptide bonds, specifically in linear amidines. The systematic name of this enzyme class is (S)-ureidoglycolate amidohydrolase (decarboxylating). This enzyme participates in purine metabolism.

== Structural studies ==
As of late 2007, 4 structures have been solved for this class of enzymes, with PDB accession codes 1XSQ, 1XSR, 1YQC, and 2BDR.
