= Bis(5'-adenosyl)-triphosphatase =

Class of enzymes

Identifiers
- EC no.: 3.6.1.29
- CAS no.: 63951-94-0

Databases
- BRENDA: enzyme data
- ExPASy: NiceZyme view
- KEGG: enzyme entry
- MetaCyc: metabolic pathway
- Rhea: reactions
- PDB structures: RCSB PDB PDBe PDBsum
- Gene Ontology: AmiGO / QuickGO
Search
- PMC: articles
- PubMed: articles
- NCBI: proteins

Bis(5'-adenosyl)-triphosphatase (EC 3.6.1.29) is an enzyme characterised from rat liver that catalyzes the hydrolysis of P(1),P(3)-bis(5′-adenosyl) triphosphate to adenosine diphosphate and adenosine monophosphate:

P(1),P(3)-bis(5′-adenosyl) triphosphate
H_{2}O
adenosine diphosphate
+
adenosine monophosphate

The enzyme is also found in higer plants, where it is part of the cell signaling process. It is involved in purine metabolism, and may have a role in the development of small-cell lung cancer, and non-small-cell lung cancer.

This enzyme is a hydrolase, specifically one acting on acid anhydrides in phosphorus-containing anhydrides. The systematic name of this enzyme class is P1,P3-bis(5'-adenosyl)-triphosphate adenylohydrolase. Other names in use include dinucleosidetriphosphatase, diadenosine 5,5-P1,P3-triphosphatase, and 1-P,3-P-bis(5'-adenosyl)-triphosphate adenylohydrolase.

== Structural studies ==
As of late 2007, 5 structures have been solved for this class of enzymes, with PDB accession codes PDB: 1FHI, PDB: 2FHI, PDB: 4FIT, PDB: 5FIT, and PDB: 6FIT.
