= Nucleotide phosphatase =

Nucleotide phosphatase may refer to:

- Purine nucleoside phosphorylase, an enzyme
- Nucleotidase, an enzyme
