= Phosphoribosylamine =

Names
- Other names PRA

Identifiers
CAS Number	14050-66-9
3D model (JSmol)	Interactive image
ChEBI	CHEBI:17284
ChemSpider	2339538
MeSH	Phosphoribosylamine
PubChem CID	3082052
CompTox Dashboard (EPA)	DTXSID10903977
- InChI: InChI=1S/C5H12NO7P/c6-5-4(8)3(7)2(13-5)1-12-14(9,10)11/h2-5,7-8H,1,6H2,(H2,9,10,11)/t2-,3-,4-,5?/m1/s1 Key: SKCBPEVYGOQGJN-SOOFDHNKSA-N
- SMILES: C([C@@H]1[C@H]([C@H](C(O1)N)O)O)OP(=O)(O)O

Properties
Chemical formula	C_{5}H_{12}NO_{7}P
Molar mass	229.125 g/mol
- Except where otherwise noted, data are given for materials in their standard state (at 25 °C [77 °F], 100 kPa). Infobox references

Phosphoribosylamine (PRA) is a biochemical intermediate in the formation of purine nucleotides via inosine-5-monophosphate, and hence is a building block for DNA and RNA. The vitamins thiamine and cobalamin also contain fragments derived from PRA.

Phosphoribosyl pyrophosphate (PRPP)

It is the product of the enzyme amidophosphoribosyltransferase which attaches ammonia from glutamine to phosphoribosyl pyrophosphate (PRPP) at its anomeric carbon:

PRPP + glutamine → PRA + glutamate + PPi

The biosynthesis pathway next combines PRA with glycine in a process driven by ATP giving glycineamide ribonucleotide (GAR). The enzyme phosphoribosylamine—glycine ligase catalyses the reaction forming an amide bond:

PRA + glycine + ATP → GAR + ADP + Pi

== See also ==
- 5-Aminoimidazole ribotide
- Purine metabolism
