= Phosphoribosylaminoimidazolesuccinocarboxamide =

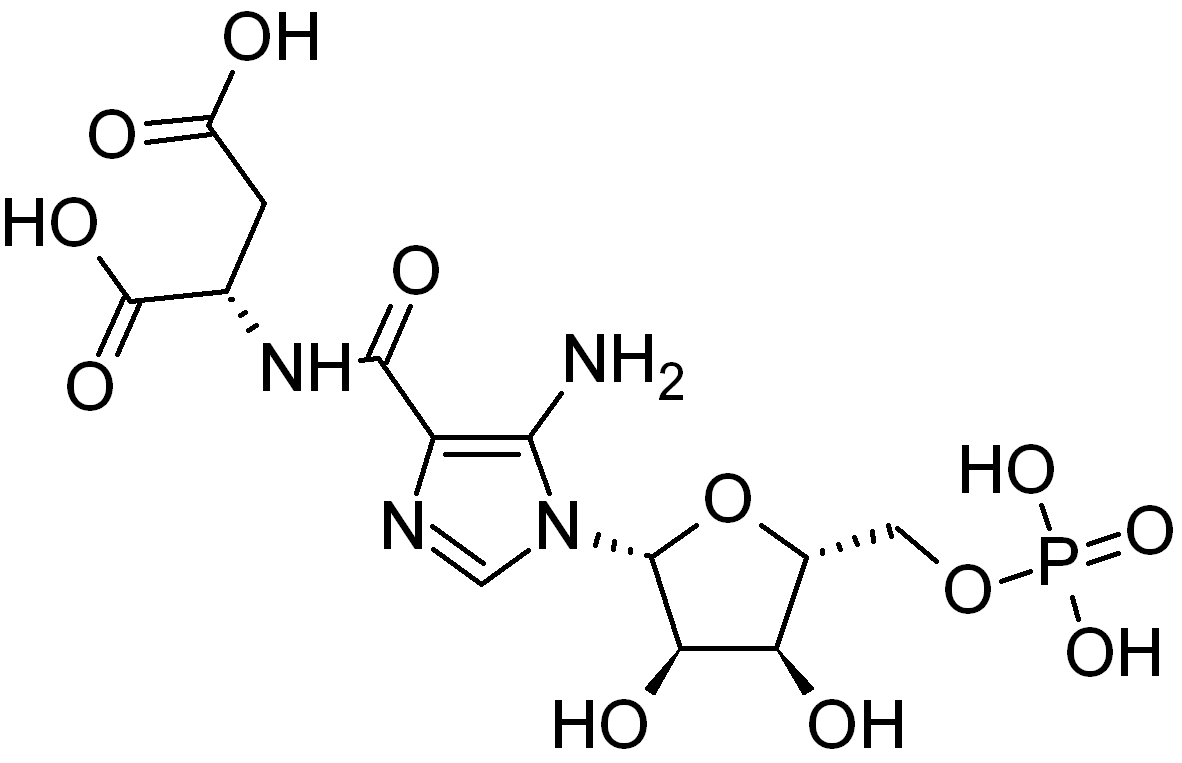

Names
- Systematic IUPAC name PP(2S)-(5-Amino-1-{(2R,3R,4S,5R)-3,4-dihydroxy-5-[(phosphonooxy)methyl]oxolan-2-yl}-1H-imidazole-4-carboxamido)butanedioic acid
- Other names SAICAR; 2-[(5-Amino-1-{3,4-dihydroxy-5-[(phosphonooxy)methyl]oxolan-2-yl}imidazol-4-yl)formamido]butanedioic acid; N-{[5-Amino-1-(5-O-phosphono-β-D-ribofuranosyl)-1H-imidazol-4-yl]carbonyl}-L-aspartic acid

Identifiers
CAS Number	3031-95-6
3D model (JSmol)	Interactive image
ChEBI	CHEBI:18319
ChemSpider	141175
KEGG	C04823
MeSH	SAICAR
PubChem CID	160666
UNII	K1PVR64RIF
CompTox Dashboard (EPA)	DTXSID90184404
- InChI: InChI=1S/C13H19N4O12P/c14-10-7(11(22)16-4(13(23)24)1-6(18)19)15-3-17(10)12-9(21)8(20)5(29-12)2-28-30(25,26)27/h3-5,8-9,12,20-21H,1-2,14H2,(H,16,22)(H,18,19)(H,23,24)(H2,25,26,27)/t4-,5+,8+,9+,12+/m0/s1 Key: NAQGHJTUZRHGAC-ZZZDFHIKSA-N; InChI=1/C13H19N4O12P/c14-10-7(11(22)16-4(13(23)24)1-6(18)19)15-3-17(10)12-9(21)8(20)5(29-12)2-28-30(25,26)27/h3-5,8-9,12,20-21H,1-2,14H2,(H,16,22)(H,18,19)(H,23,24)(H2,25,26,27)/t4-,5+,8+,9+,12+/m0/s1 Key: NAQGHJTUZRHGAC-ZZZDFHIKBX
- SMILES: O=C(O)C[C@@H](C(=O)O)NC(=O)c1ncn(c1N)[C@@H]2O[C@@H]([C@@H](O)[C@H]2O)COP(=O)(O)O

Properties
Chemical formula	C_{13}H_{19}N_{4}O_{12}P
Molar mass	454.285 g·mol^{−1}
- Except where otherwise noted, data are given for materials in their standard state (at 25 °C [77 °F], 100 kPa). verify (what is ?) Infobox references

Phosphoribosylaminoimidazolesuccinocarboxamide (SAICAR) is an intermediate in the formation of purines. The conversion of ATP, L-aspartate, and 5-aminoimidazole-4-carboxyribonucleotide (CAIR) to 5-aminoimidazole-4-(N-succinylcarboxamide) ribonucleotide, ADP, and phosphate by phosphoribosylaminoimidazolesuccinocarboxamide synthetase (SAICAR synthetase) represents the eighth step of de novo purine nucleotide biosynthesis.
