= Purine metabolism =

Chemical reactions and pathways involving lysis of purine nucleotides

Purine metabolism refers to the metabolic pathways to synthesize and break down purines that are present in many organisms.

== Biosynthesis ==
Purines are biologically synthesized as nucleotides and in particular as ribotides, i.e. bases attached to ribose 5-phosphate. Both adenine and guanine are derived from the nucleotide inosine monophosphate (IMP), which is the first compound in the pathway to have a completely formed purine ring system.

=== IMP ===
Diagram of the synthesis of IMP enzymes coenzymes substrate names metal ions inorganic molecules

Inosine monophosphate is synthesized on a pre-existing ribose-phosphate through a complex pathway (as shown in the figure on the right). The source of the carbon and nitrogen atoms of the purine ring, 5 and 4 respectively, come from multiple sources. The amino acid glycine contributes all its carbon (2) and nitrogen (1) atoms, with additional nitrogen atoms from glutamine (2) and aspartic acid (1), and additional carbon atoms from formyl groups (2), which are transferred from the coenzyme tetrahydrofolate as 10-formyltetrahydrofolate, and a carbon atom from bicarbonate (1). Formyl groups build carbon-2 and carbon-8 in the purine ring system, which are the ones acting as bridges between two nitrogen atoms.

A key regulatory step is the production of 5-phospho-α-D-ribosyl 1-pyrophosphate (PRPP) by ribose-phosphate diphosphokinase, which is activated by inorganic phosphate and inactivated by purine ribonucleotides. It is not the committed step to purine synthesis because PRPP is also used in pyrimidine synthesis and salvage pathways.

The first committed step is the reaction of PRPP, glutamine and water to 5'-phosphoribosylamine (PRA), glutamate, and pyrophosphate - catalyzed by amidophosphoribosyltransferase, which is activated by PRPP and inhibited by AMP, GMP and IMP.

PRPP + L-Glutamine + H_{2}O → PRA + L-Glutamate + PPi

In the second step react PRA, glycine and ATP to create GAR, ADP, and pyrophosphate - catalyzed by phosphoribosylamine—glycine ligase (GAR synthetase). Due to the chemical lability of PRA, which has a half-life of 38 seconds at PH 7.5 and 37 °C, researchers have suggested that the compound is channeled from amidophosphoribosyltransferase to GAR synthetase in vivo.

PRA + Glycine + ATP → GAR + ADP + Pi

Steps 3 through 10 are catalyzed by the following enzymes:

3. phosphoribosylglycinamide formyltransferase.

GAR + fTHF → fGAR + THF

4. phosphoribosylformylglycinamidine synthase.

fGAR + L-Glutamine + ATP → fGAM + L-Glutamate + ADP + Pi

5. AIR synthetase (FGAM cyclase).

fGAM + ATP → AIR + ADP + Pi + H_{2}O

6. phosphoribosylaminoimidazole carboxylase.

AIR + CO_{2} → CAIR + 2H^{+}

7. phosphoribosylaminoimidazolesuccinocarboxamide synthase.

CAIR + L-Aspartate + ATP → SAICAR + ADP + Pi

8. adenylosuccinate lyase.

SAICAR → AICAR + Fumarate

The products AICAR and fumarate move on to two different pathways. AICAR serves as the reactant for the ninth step, while fumarate is transported to the citric acid cycle which can then skip the carbon dioxide evolution steps to produce malate. The conversion of fumarate to malate is catalyzed by fumarase. In this way, fumarate connects purine synthesis to the citric acid cycle.

9. phosphoribosylaminoimidazolecarboxamide formyltransferase.

AICAR + fTHF → FAICAR + THF

10. Inosine monophosphate synthase.

FAICAR → IMP + H_{2}O

In eukaryotes the second, third, and fifth step are catalyzed by trifunctional purine biosynthetic protein adenosine-3, which is encoded by the GART gene.

Both ninth and tenth step are accomplished by a single protein named Bifunctional purine biosynthesis protein PURH, encoded by the ATIC gene.

=== GMP ===
- IMP dehydrogenase (IMPDH) converts IMP into XMP
- GMP synthase converts XMP into GMP
- GMP reductase converts GMP back into IMP

=== AMP ===
- adenylosuccinate synthase (AdSS) converts IMP to adenylosuccinate
- adenylosuccinate lyase converts adenylosuccinate into AMP
- AMP deaminase converts AMP back into IMP

== Degradation ==
Purines are metabolised by several enzymes:

=== Guanine ===
- A nuclease frees the nucleotide
- A nucleotidase creates guanosine
- Purine nucleoside phosphorylase (PNP) converts guanosine to guanine
- Guanase converts guanine to xanthine
- Xanthine oxidase (a form of xanthine oxidoreductase) catalyzes the oxidation of xanthine to uric acid

=== Adenine ===
- A nuclease frees the nucleotide
  - A nucleotidase creates adenosine, then adenosine deaminase creates inosine
  - Alternatively, AMP deaminase creates inosinic acid, then a nucleotidase creates inosine
- Purine nucleoside phosphorylase acts upon inosine to create hypoxanthine
- Xanthine oxidase catalyzes the biotransformation of hypoxanthine to xanthine
- Xanthine oxidase acts upon xanthine to create uric acid

=== Regulations of purine nucleotide biosynthesis ===
The formation of 5'-phosphoribosylamine from glutamine and PRPP catalysed by PRPP amino transferase is the regulation point for purine synthesis. The enzyme is an allosteric enzyme, so it can be converted from IMP, GMP and AMP in high concentration binds the enzyme to exerts inhibition while PRPP is in large amount binds to the enzyme which causes activation. So IMP, GMP and AMP are inhibitors while PRPP is an activator. Between the formation of 5'-phosphoribosyl, aminoimidazole and IMP, there is no known regulation step.

== Salvage ==
Purines from turnover of cellular nucleic acids (or from food) can also be salvaged and reused in new nucleotides.

- The enzyme adenine phosphoribosyltransferase (APRT) salvages adenine.
- The enzyme hypoxanthine-guanine phosphoribosyltransferase (HGPRT) salvages guanine and hypoxanthine. (Genetic deficiency of HGPRT causes Lesch–Nyhan syndrome.)

== Disorders ==
When a defective gene causes gaps to appear in the metabolic recycling process for purines and pyrimidines, these chemicals are not metabolised properly, and adults or children can suffer from any one of twenty-eight hereditary disorders, possibly some more as yet unknown. Symptoms can include gout, anaemia, epilepsy, delayed development, deafness, compulsive self-biting, kidney failure or stones, or loss of immunity.

Purine metabolism can have imbalances that can arise from harmful nucleotide triphosphates incorporating into DNA and RNA which further lead to genetic disturbances and mutations, and as a result, give rise to several types of diseases. Some of the diseases are:

1. Severe immunodeficiency by loss of adenosine deaminase.
2. Hyperuricemia and Lesch–Nyhan syndrome by the loss of hypoxanthine-guanine phosphoribosyltransferase.
3. Different types of cancer by an increase in the activities of enzymes like IMP dehydrogenase.

== Pharmacotherapy ==
Modulation of purine metabolism has pharmacotherapeutic value.

Purine synthesis inhibitors inhibit the proliferation of cells, especially leukocytes. These inhibitors include azathioprine, an immunosuppressant used in organ transplantation, autoimmune disease such as rheumatoid arthritis or inflammatory bowel disease such as Crohn's disease and ulcerative colitis.

Mycophenolate mofetil is an immunosuppressant drug used to prevent rejection in organ transplantation; it inhibits purine synthesis by blocking inosine monophosphate dehydrogenase (IMPDH). Methotrexate also indirectly inhibits purine synthesis by blocking the metabolism of folic acid (it is an inhibitor of the dihydrofolate reductase).

Allopurinol is a drug that inhibits the enzyme xanthine oxidoreductase and, thus, lowers the level of uric acid in the body. This may be useful in the treatment of gout, which is a disease caused by excess uric acid, forming crystals in joints.

== Prebiotic synthesis of purine ribonucleosides ==
In order to understand how life arose, knowledge is required of the chemical pathways that permit formation of the key building blocks of life under plausible prebiotic conditions. Nam et al. demonstrated the direct condensation of purine and pyrimidine nucleobases with ribose to give ribonucleosides in aqueous microdroplets, a key step leading to RNA formation. Also, a plausible prebiotic process for synthesizing purine ribonucleosides was presented by Becker et al.

== Purine biosynthesis in the three domains of life ==
Organisms in all three domains of life, eukaryotes, bacteria and archaea, are able to carry out de novo biosynthesis of purines. This ability reflects the essentiality of purines for life. The biochemical pathway of synthesis is very similar in eukaryotes and bacterial species, but is more variable among archaeal species. A nearly complete, or complete, set of genes required for purine biosynthesis was determined to be present in 58 of the 65 archaeal species studied. However, also identified were seven archaeal species with entirely, or nearly entirely, absent purine encoding genes. Apparently the archaeal species unable to synthesize purines are able to acquire exogenous purines for growth., and are thus similar to purine mutants of eukaryotes, e.g. purine mutants of the Ascomycete fungus Neurospora crassa, that also require exogenous purines for growth.

== See also ==
- Purine nucleotide cycle
- Purinergic signaling
- Disease-modifying antirheumatic drug (DMARD)
