= Phosphomethylpyrimidine synthase =

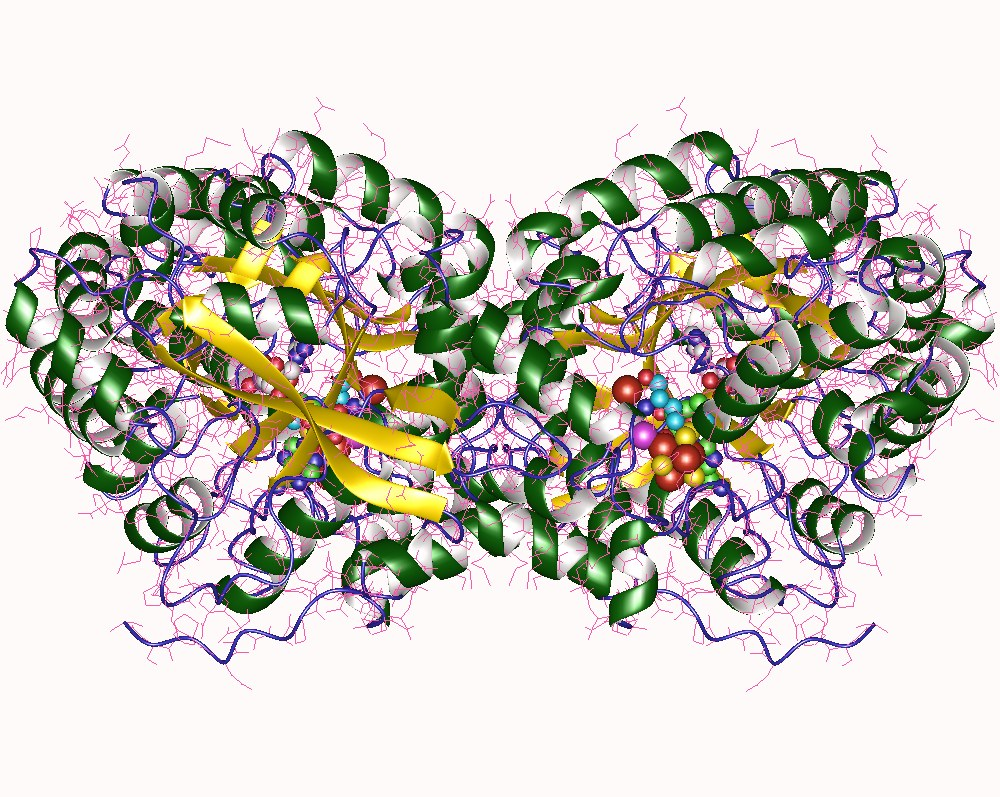
- Phosphomethylpyrimidine synthase dimer, Arabidopsis thaliana

Identifiers
- EC no.: 4.1.99.17

Databases
- IntEnz: IntEnz view
- BRENDA: BRENDA entry
- ExPASy: NiceZyme view
- KEGG: KEGG entry
- MetaCyc: metabolic pathway
- PRIAM: profile
- PDB structures: RCSB PDB PDBe PDBsum
Search
- PMC: articles
- PubMed: articles
- NCBI: proteins

Phosphomethylpyrimidine synthase (EC 4.1.99.17, thiC (gene)) is an enzyme with systematic name 5-amino-1-(5-phospho-D-ribosyl)imidazole formate-lyase (decarboxylating, 4-amino-2-methyl-5-phosphomethylpyrimidine-forming). This enzyme catalyses the following chemical reaction

5-amino-1-(5-phospho-D-ribosyl)imidazole + S-adenosyl-L-methionine $\rightleftharpoons$ 4-amino-2-methyl-5-phosphomethylpyrimidine + 5′-deoxyadenosine + L-methionine + formate + CO

This enzyme binds a 4Fe-4S cluster.

The starting material is 5-aminoimidazole ribotide, which undergoes a rearrangement reaction via radical intermediates which incorporate the blue, green and red fragments shown into the product.
