= 6S / SsrS RNA =

Non-coding RNA

- Predicted secondary structure and sequence conservation of 6S

Identifiers
- Symbol: 6S
- Rfam: RF00013

Other data
- RNA type: Gene
- Domain: Bacteria
- SO: SO:0000376
- PDB structures: PDBe

In the field of molecular biology, the 6S RNA is a non-coding RNA that was one of the first to be identified and sequenced. What it does in the bacterial cell was unknown until recently. In the early 2000s, scientists found out the function of 6S RNA to be as a regulator of sigma 70-dependent gene transcription. All bacterial RNA polymerases have a subunit called a sigma factor. The sigma factors are important because they control how DNA promoter binding and RNA transcription start sites. Sigma 70 was the first one to be discovered in Escherichia coli.

== Structure ==
The structure of 6S RNA was defined in 1971. It is a small RNA strand consisting of 184 nucleotides. 6S RNA is a long double-stranded structure and has a single strand loop. The structure is similar to an open promoter complex of DNA structure. Various analyses discovered that 6S RNAs are capable of forming a secondary structure. The secondary structure consists of two irregular helical stem regions, making a large core loop which is called a central knot.

== Function and Regulation ==
The function of 6S RNA is to regulate transcription for E. coli cell survival because it is essential in the process. 6S RNA specifically associates with RNA polymerase holoenzyme containing the sigma70 specificity factor. This interaction represses expression from sigma70-dependent promoters during stationary phase. Which will lead to activate the transcription from sigma 70 dependent promoters. Therefore, during the change in E. coli from logarithmic growth to stationary phase, the 6S RNA performs as a regulator of transcription. 6S RNA homologs have recently been identified in most bacterial genomes. Polymerase holoenzyme, which contains the housekeeping sigma factor and it can be expressed during different stages of growth. In many Pseudomonadota, 6S RNA may be processed from a transcript encoding homologs of the E. coli YgfA protein, which is a putative methenyltetrahydrofolate synthetase. Diverged 6S RNAs have been identified in additional bacterial lineages. The purD RNA motif has been experimentally shown to overlap with 6S RNA. One way to examine if the activity of 6S RNA by doing a knockout of 6S RNA. Strains with mutations in 6S RNA have a reduction of lifespan in contrast to the wild-type cells after more than 20 days of nonstop culture. When mutant 6S cells cultured with wild-type cells, it will be at a modest disadvantage in the following days of growth.

== Summary ==
The recently discovered homologs of 6S are two Bacillus subtilis RNAs and cyanobacterial RNAs. Two 6S RNA, 6S-1 and 2 along with their encoding genes bsrA and B present at various positions of a genome. In stationary phase, deletion of 6S-1 in B. subtilis results in inhibition of its growth. The absence of 6S-2 RNA, on the other hand, does not appear to influence growth and sporulation in the stationary phase. 6S RNA conserved feature shows that it binds to the RNA polymerase by replicating the structure of DNA template. Promoter-dependent transcriptional regulation is mediated by 6S RNA as some of the promoters may be down-regulated and some are insensitive in the presence of 6S RNA. Gene expression studies revealed that 6S RNA is integrated in different global pathways e.g., it regulates various factors that influence transcription like Crp, FNR etc. and translation mechanism.

Scientist discovered that 6S RNA binds with the active site of RNA polymerase and can serve as a template for RNA synthesis required for the RNA synthesis. It down-regulates transcription from 3´-5´fold at various promoters but doesn't inhibit transcription during late stationary phase. In a nutrient-deficient environment, 6S RNA control transcription leads to altered cell survival, possibly through redirecting resource consumption.

Through SDS-PAGE analysis 6S RNA was identified present in E. coli and cover almost 25% of the total ribosomal number. 1000-1500 molecules were estimated to be present in E. coli genome. Although 6S RNA does not appear to be associated with ribosomes, it does appear to be complexed with several proteins and migrates at around 11S.

6S RNA is a regulator of RNA polymerase and abundantly present in bacteria. Studies has shown that the 6S RNA forms a complex with RNA polymerase to initiate transcription. Lack of 6S RNA in cells result in altered phenotypes.

A unique feature of 6S RNA is that it acts like a template for RNA synthesis, and the length and abundance of RNAs vary according to cell physiology. pRNA synthesis is critical as it releases RNA polymerase that allows the inhibition to be reversed.

Structural and functional analyses showed the interactions between RNA polymerase and E. coli 6S RNA. The functional variety of 6S RNAs was discovered by genome-wide transcriptome studies. Numerous recent investigations have suggested that 6S RNA serves as a guardian, regulating the efficient utilisation of cellular resources under restricted conditions and stress. By interacting with the sigma 70-dependent RNA polymerase holoenzyme in the stationary phase, high abundant 6S RNA is discovered to influence gene transcription, resulting in bacterial response regulation to challenges such as hunger.

6S RNA in E. coli abundantly increases throughout in log and early stationary phase. So, the increase level of 6S RNA regulate alterations in gene expression are expected to aid adaptation to environmental challenges such as nutritional scarcity and high cell density.

6S RNA role in bacterial virulence has been identified that includes L. pneumophila and Salmonella enterica serovar Typhimurium specifically where pathogenesis is linked to replication and stress resistance.
