= PurD RNA motif =

RNA structure

purD RNA motif
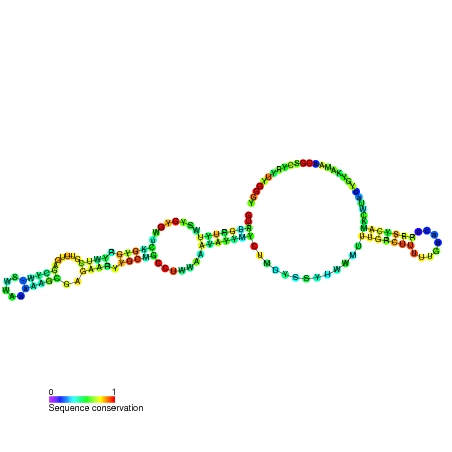
- Predicted secondary structure and sequence conservation of purD

Identifiers
- Symbol: purD
- Rfam: RF01069

Other data
- RNA type: Cis-reg
- Domain(s): Bacteria
- SO: SO:0005836
- PDB structures: PDBe

The purD RNA motif is a conserved RNA structure found in Campylobacterota, such as the genera Helicobacter and Campylobacter. The RNA is consistently found in the apparent 5' UTR of purD genes. purD genes encode the enzyme Phosphoribosylamine-glycine ligase, which catalyzes an early step in de novo purine synthesis. Although a possible cis-regulatory role was proposed for this motif, experimental results indicate that it overlaps the 6S RNA of the relevant species, and that the second hairpin of the motif might not be biological.
