= Phosphoribosyl-N-formylglycineamide =

Names
- IUPAC name (1R)-1,4-Anhydro-1-(N^{2}-formylglycinamido)-D-ribitol 5-(dihydrogen phosphate)
- Systematic IUPAC name [(2R,3S,4R,5R)-5-(2-Formamidoacetamido)-3,4-dihydroxyoxolan-2-yl]methyl dihydrogen phosphate
- Other names Formylglycinamide ribonucleotide, Formylglycinamide ribotide, FGAR

Identifiers
CAS Number	349-34-8
3D model (JSmol)	Interactive image
ChemSpider	115687
MeSH	Phosphoribosyl-N-formylglycineamide
PubChem CID	130805
UNII	X3J3LQ4ML8
CompTox Dashboard (EPA)	DTXSID00956376
- InChI: InChI=1S/C8H15N2O9P/c11-3-9-1-5(12)10-8-7(14)6(13)4(19-8)2-18-20(15,16)17/h3-4,6-8,13-14H,1-2H2,(H,9,11)(H,10,12)(H2,15,16,17)/t4-,6-,7-,8-/m1/s1 Key: VDXLUNDMVKSKHO-XVFCMESISA-N
- SMILES: C([C@@H]1[C@H]([C@H]([C@@H](O1)NC(=O)CNC=O)O)O)OP(=O)(O)O

Properties
Chemical formula	C_{8}H_{15}N_{2}O_{9}P
Molar mass	314.187 g/mol
- Except where otherwise noted, data are given for materials in their standard state (at 25 °C [77 °F], 100 kPa). Infobox references

Phosphoribosyl-N-formylglycineamide (or FormylGlycinAmideRibotide, FGAR) is a biochemical intermediate in the formation of purine nucleotides via inosine-5-monophosphate, and hence is a building block for DNA and RNA. The vitamins thiamine and cobalamin also contain fragments derived from FGAR.

FGAR is formed when the enzyme phosphoribosylglycinamide formyltransferase adds a formyl group from 10-formyltetrahydrofolate to glycineamide ribonucleotide (GAR) in reaction EC 2.1.2.2:

GAR + 10-formyltetrahydrofolate → FGAR + tetrahydrofolate

The biosynthesis pathway next converts FGAR to an amidine by the action of phosphoribosylformylglycinamidine synthase (EC 6.3.5.3), transferring an amino group from glutamine and giving 5'-phosphoribosylformylglycinamidine (FGAM) in a reaction that also requires ATP:

FGAR + ATP + glutamine + H_{2}O → FGAM + ADP + glutamate + Pi

== See also ==
- 5-Aminoimidazole ribotide
- Purine metabolism
