= Trifunctional purine biosynthetic protein adenosine-3 =

Mammalian protein found in Homo sapiens

GART
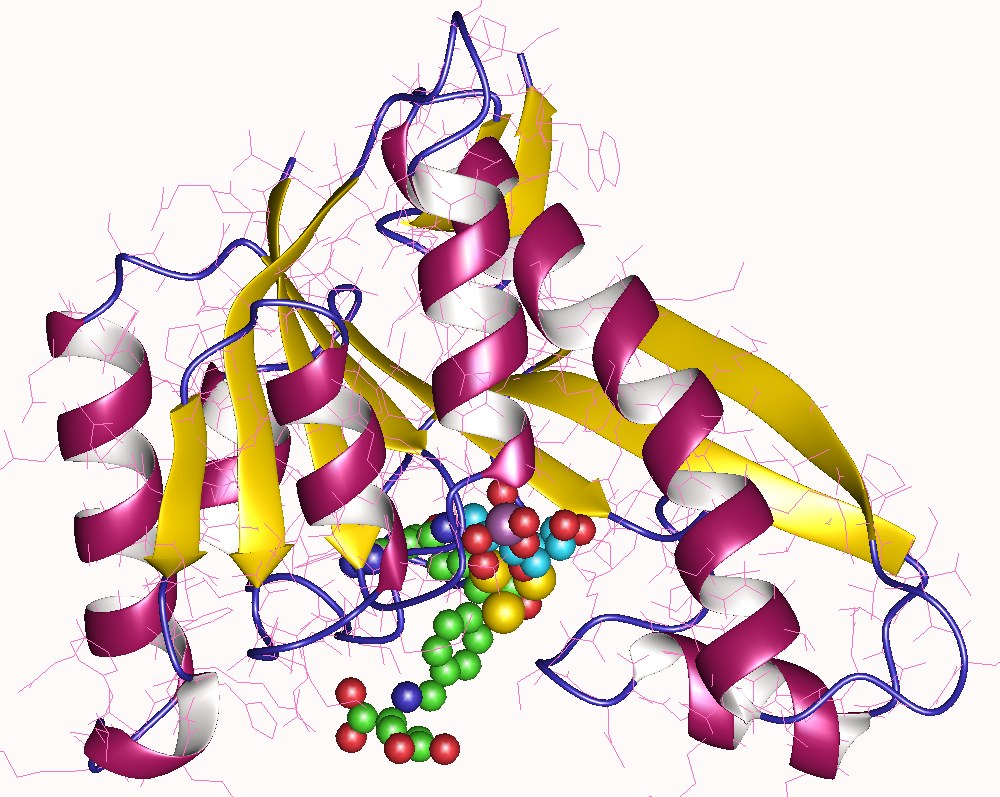

Identifiers
- Aliases: GART, AIRS, GARS, GARTF, PAIS, PGFT, PRGS, phosphoribosylglycinamide formyltransferase, phosphoribosylglycinamide synthetase, phosphoribosylaminoimidazole synthetase
- External IDs: OMIM: 138440; MGI: 95654; GeneCards: GART
Available structures
PDB	Ortholog search: PDBe RCSB
PDB	List of PDB id codes 1MEJ, 1MEN, 1MEO, 1NJS, 1RBM, 1RBQ, 1RBY, 1RBZ, 1RC0, 1RC1, 1ZLX, 1ZLY, 2QK4, 2V9Y, 4EW1, 4EW2, 4EW3, 4ZZ2, 4ZZ3, 4ZZ1, 4ZYV, 4ZZ0, 4ZYY, 4ZYX, 4ZYZ, 4ZYT, 4ZYU, 4ZYW
Enzyme activity
EC #	BRENDA	ExPASy	KEGG	MetaCyc
2.1.2.2	↗	↗	↗	↗
6.3.3.1	↗	↗	↗	↗
6.3.4.13	↗	↗	↗	↗

Gene location (Human)
Chr.	Chromosome 21 (human)
Band	21q22.11	Start	33,503,931 bp
Band	21q22.11	End	33,543,491 bp

Gene location (Mouse)
Chr.	Chromosome 16 (mouse)
Band	16 C3.3|16 53.18 cM	Start	91,418,074 bp
Band	16 C3.3|16 53.18 cM	End	91,443,840 bp
RNA expression pattern
Bgee	Human / Mouse (ortholog); Top expressed in: ventricular zone; ganglionic eminence; rectum; smooth muscle tissue; epithelium of colon; body of pancreas; gastric mucosa; trabecular bone; islet of Langerhans; tonsil / Top expressed in: Ileal epithelium; epiblast; primitive streak; yolk sac; embryo; somite; extraocular muscle; ventricular zone; embryo; morula; More reference expression data
BioGPS	n/a
Gene ontology
Molecular function	transferase activity; nucleotide binding; phosphoribosylglycinamide formyltransferase activity; metal ion binding; ligase activity; catalytic activity; hydroxymethyl-, formyl- and related transferase activity; ATP binding; phosphoribosylformylglycinamidine cyclo-ligase activity; phosphoribosylamine-glycine ligase activity
Cellular component	cytoplasm; cytosol; extracellular exosome
Biological process	purine nucleotide biosynthetic process; glycine metabolic process; 'de novo' IMP biosynthetic process; brainstem development; biosynthetic process; response to organic substance; cerebellum development; ribonucleoside monophosphate biosynthetic process; tetrahydrofolate biosynthetic process; response to inorganic substance; purine ribonucleoside monophosphate biosynthetic process; cerebral cortex development; metabolism; purine nucleobase biosynthetic process; adenine biosynthetic process
Sources:Amigo / QuickGO
Orthologs
Databases	NCBI: entry; OMA: entry
Species	Human	Mouse
Entrez	2618	14450
Ensembl	ENSG00000262473; ENSG00000159131	ENSMUSG00000022962
UniProt	P22102	Q64737
RefSeq (mRNA)	NM_000819; NM_001136005; NM_001136006; NM_175085	NM_010256; NM_001357351
RefSeq (protein)	NP_000810; NP_001129477; NP_001129478; NP_780294	NP_034386; NP_001344280
Location (UCSC)	Chr 21: 33.5 – 33.54 Mb	Chr 16: 91.42 – 91.44 Mb
PubMed search
- Wikidata
View/Edit Human	View/Edit Mouse

Trifunctional purine biosynthetic protein adenosine-3 is an enzyme that in humans is encoded by the GART gene.

This protein is a trifunctional polypeptide. It has phosphoribosylamine—glycine ligase (EC 6.3.4.13), phosphoribosylglycinamide formyltransferase (EC 2.1.2.2), AIR synthetase (FGAM cyclase) (EC 6.3.3.1) activity which is required for de novo purine biosynthesis.
