= Glycineamide ribonucleotide =

Names
- IUPAC name (1R)-1,4-Anhydro-1-glycinamido-D-ribitol 5-(dihydrogen phosphate)
- Systematic IUPAC name [(2R,3S,4R,5R)-5-(2-Aminoacetamido)-3,4-dihydroxyoxolan-2-yl]methyl dihydrogen phosphate
- Other names Glycinamide ribotide, GAR

Identifiers
CAS Number	10074-18-7
3D model (JSmol)	Interactive image
ChEBI	CHEBI:143019
ChemSpider	141370
KEGG	C03838
PubChem CID	160913
UNII	K343GZ6PUY
CompTox Dashboard (EPA)	DTXSID70143478
- InChI: InChI=1S/C7H15N2O8P/c8-1-4(10)9-7-6(12)5(11)3(17-7)2-16-18(13,14)15/h3,5-7,11-12H,1-2,8H2,(H,9,10)(H2,13,14,15)/t3-,5-,6-,7-/m1/s1 Key: OBQMLSFOUZUIOB-SHUUEZRQSA-N
- SMILES: C([C@@H]1[C@H]([C@H]([C@@H](O1)NC(=O)CN)O)O)OP(=O)(O)O

Properties
Chemical formula	C_{7}H_{15}N_{2}O_{8}P
Molar mass	286.177 g·mol^{−1}
- Except where otherwise noted, data are given for materials in their standard state (at 25 °C [77 °F], 100 kPa). Infobox references

Glycinamide ribonucleotide (or GAR) is a biochemical intermediate in the formation of purine nucleotides via inosine-5-monophosphate, and hence is a building block for DNA and RNA. The vitamins thiamine and cobalamin also contain fragments derived from GAR.

Phosphoribosylamine (PRA)

GAR is the product of the enzyme phosphoribosylamine—glycine ligase acting on phosphoribosylamine (PRA) to combine it with glycine in a process driven by ATP. The reaction, EC 6.3.4.13 forms an amide bond:

PRA + glycine + ATP → GAR + ADP + Pi

The biosynthesis pathway next adds a formyl group from 10-formyltetrahydrofolate to GAR, catalysed by phosphoribosylglycinamide formyltransferase in reaction EC 2.1.2.2 and producing formylglycinamide ribotide (FGAR):

GAR + 10-formyltetrahydrofolate → FGAR + tetrahydrofolate

== See also ==
- 5-Aminoimidazole ribotide
- Purine metabolism
