= GMP reductase =

Class of enzymes

guanosine monophosphate reductase
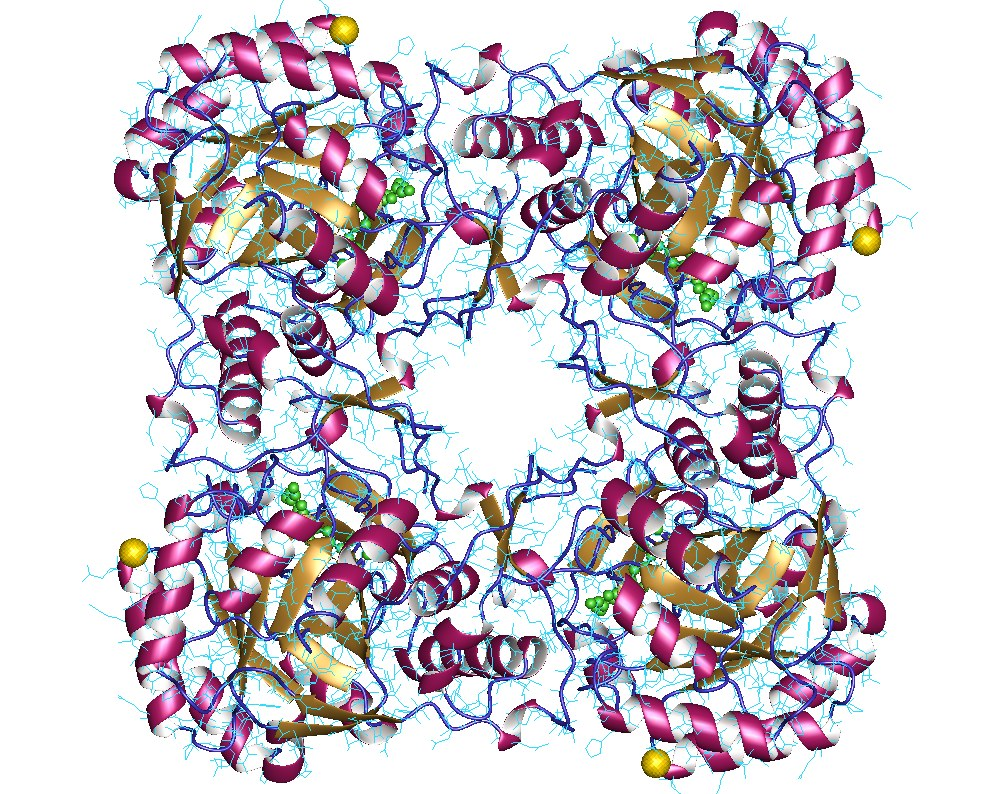

Identifiers
- Symbol: GMPR
- NCBI gene: 2766
- HGNC: 4376
- OMIM: 139265
- RefSeq: NM_006877
- UniProt: P36959

Other data
- EC number: 1.7.1.7
- Locus: Chr. 6 p23
Search for
- Structures: Swiss-model
- Domains: InterPro

guanosine monophosphate reductase 2

Identifiers
- Symbol: GMPR2
- NCBI gene: 51292
- HGNC: 4377
- OMIM: 610781
- RefSeq: NM_016576
- UniProt: Q9P2T1

Other data
- Locus: Chr. 14 q11.2
Search for
- Structures: Swiss-model
- Domains: InterPro

GMP reductase EC 1.7.1.7 (Guanosine 5'-monophosphate oxidoreductase ) is an enzyme that catalyzes the irreversible and NADPH-dependent reductive deamination of GMP into IMP.

guanosine monophosphate
+ NADPH
NH_{3}
inosine monophosphate
+ NADP^{+}

By converting guanosine nucleotides to inosine nucleotides, which serve as precursors to both adenosine (A) and G nucleotides, it helps maintains intracellular balance of A and G nucleotides. GMP can be broken down (catabolized) by other enzymes, but GMPR catalyzes the only recognized route for converting GMP to AMP (indirectly, through the IMP intermediate). Whereas the conversion of GMP to IMP involves a single enzyme, GMPR, the conversion of IMP to GMP involves two enzymes. First, inosine monophosphate dehydrogenase (IMPDH) catalyzes the conversion of IMP to XMP; then GMP synthetase (GMPS) catalyzes the conversion of XMP to GMP. These two pathways are inversely regulated, with conditions favoring IMPDH expression decreasing GMPR expression. In melanocytic cells, GMP reductase gene expression may be regulated by MITF. It is activated by GTP and inhibited by xanthosine 5'-monophosphate (XMP).

The amino acid sequence that makes up the GMP reductase is similar across organisms. In humans, there are hGMPR1 and hGMPR2, 2 GMP reductases that are different in their amino acid sequence (90% of the sequence is conserved) but has the same function overall. Although hGMPR1 and hGMPR2 do not have an identical amino acid sequence, they have similar kinetic properties and they both use NADPH as a coenzyme for their catalyzed reaction. Aside from human erythrocytes, GMPR has been isolated from E.coli as well as rodents.

== Structure and catalytic mechanism ==
A crystal structure of hGMPR2 was obtained, and the model shows that hGMPR2 is a homotetramer that consist of a mix of alpha helices and beta sheets (parallel and antiparallel). Each monomer interacts with each other at their edges, which allow for stabilization of the tetramer structure. On the surface of each monomer, there are phosphate molecules that exist without any interactions with other subunits. The monomers are listed as monomer A, B, C and D. Monomers A and B consist of 338 residues, one GMP and two sulfate ions. Monomer C is similar, consisting of 327 residues, one GMP molecule and two sulfate ions. Monomer D, however, does not contain a GMP molecule and only consist of 317 residues and two sulfate ions. The alpha helices and beta sheets comes together to form a 8-stranded barrel core, in which it contains several hydrophobic residues that allow the stabilization of the core. The structure also contains disulfide bonds between Cys68 and Cys95, which are not conserved in most GMPRs, but is proposed to be important for stabilizing the entire tetramer structure.

The overall reaction consists of two steps: a deamination step, in which ammonia is released from guanosine and a covalent enzyme-GXP (E-XMP*) intermediate is formed, followed by a hydride transfer step, in which E-XMP* is reduced with a hydride from NADPH, releasing IMP. Inosine monophosphate dehydrogenase (IMPDH) and GMPR have similar catalytic mechanisms but different structural dynamics.

== Species distribution ==
The rat version of GMPR is expressed in brown adipose tissue (BAT) when certain conditions triggers its response and it is mainly present in the kidney, as well as cardiac and skeletal muscle. One of these conditions include cold stimulation. When the organism is exposed to the cold, the GMPR RNA expression can increase to a maximum of 30 fold, allowing heat production. A hypothesis for this occurring is that the conversion of GMP to IMP potentially increase adenylosuccinate (precursor of AMP), which allows for the production of a second messenger cAMP. This messenger is important for the BAT heat production.

== Clinical significance ==
It has been realized that GMPR and its products increases in Alzheimer's disease. The GMPR gene encodes for the protein GMPR1 (GMP reductase enzyme) that catalyzes the reaction for converting GMP to IMP. IMP can also be converted to AMP and adenosine (A). The presence of the adenosine can bind to A1/A2 receptors (important for mediation of Tau phosphorylation) which ultimately results in increased expression of Alzheimer's disease. This is because Alzheimer's disease is due to neurofilament tangles (NFT) forming inside neurons, and phosphorylation of tau is one of the reasons for why the tangles form. Activation of the adenosine receptors increases the tangling of neurofilaments so Alzheimer's disease patients' conditions will worsen. By testing for possible inhibitors of GMPR1, it can help eliminate Tau phosphorylation.

GMPR is also involved in the skin cancer melanoma. For patients with melanoma, expression of GMPR becomes reduced. An important role that GMPR plays in melanoma is that it reduces Rho-GTPases and it prevents melanoma cells from forming invadopodia, breaking down the extracellular matrix, and growing as tumors. It does this by using up or essentially decreasing the amount of GTP available. This decreases the supply of guanosine available and therefore, decrease the potential of having an invasive property. By decreasing the amounts of GMPR, it increases the chance of invasion and symptoms of melanoma to occur. Therefore, GMPR is needed to suppress melanoma invasion.

GMPR also plays a role in leukemia. It has been found that in the cases of promyelocytic leukemia cells being differentiate to monocytes, the expression of GMPR has increased by a lot. Therefore, the gene for GMPR can also be a potential target for the treating leukemia.

== See also ==
- Purine metabolism
