= Phosphoribosylaminoimidazolesuccinocarboxamide synthase =

Class of enzymes

SAICAR synthase
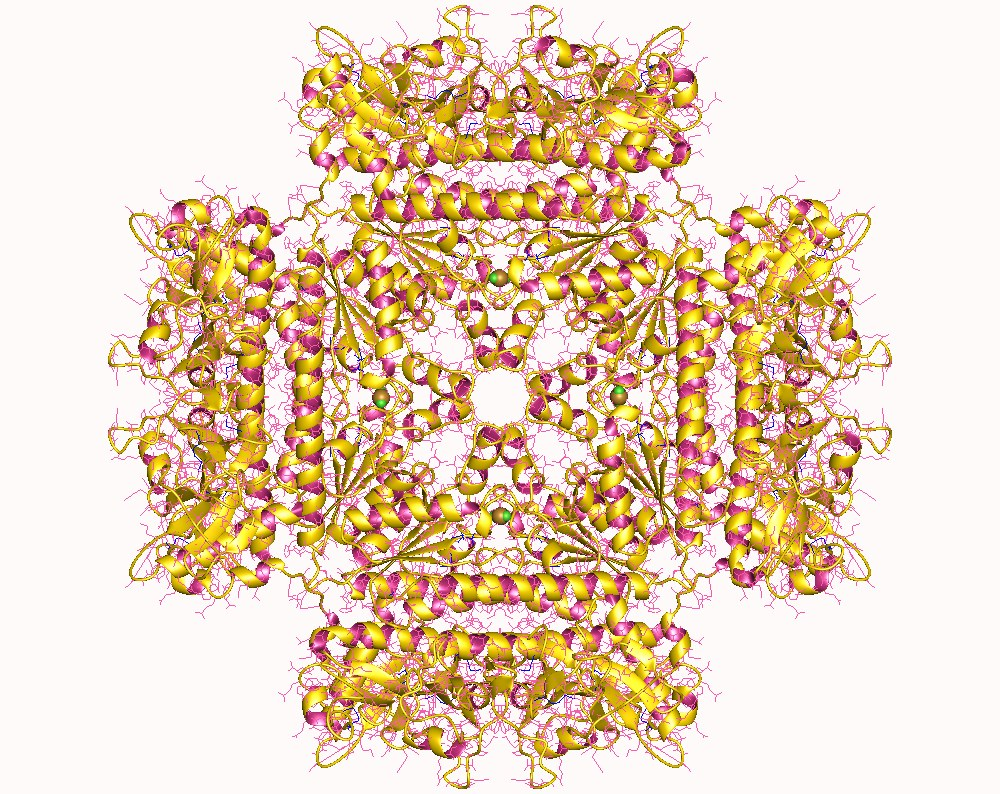
- Phosphoribosylaminoimidazole succinocarboxamide synthetase oktamer, Human

Identifiers
- EC no.: 6.3.2.6
- CAS no.: 9023-67-0

Databases
- BRENDA: enzyme data
- ExPASy: NiceZyme view
- KEGG: enzyme entry
- MetaCyc: metabolic pathway
- Rhea: reactions
- PDB structures: RCSB PDB PDBe PDBsum
- Gene Ontology: AmiGO / QuickGO
Search
- PMC: articles
- PubMed: articles
- NCBI: proteins

SAICAR synthetase
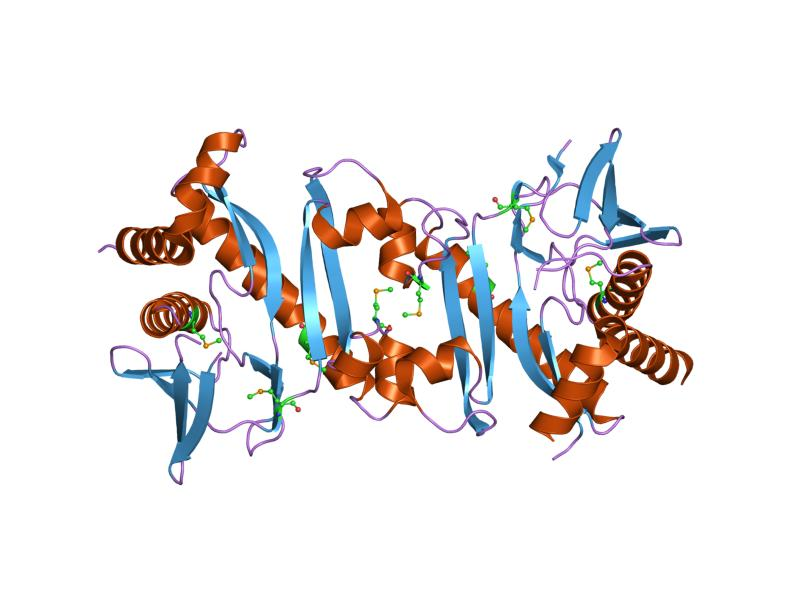
- Structural genomics, protein TM1243, (SAICAR synthetase)

Identifiers
- Symbol: SAICAR_synt
- Pfam: PF01259
- InterPro: IPR001636
- PROSITE: PDOC00810
- SCOP2: 1a48 / SCOPe / SUPFAM
- CDD: cd00476
Available protein structures:
- PDB: IPR001636 PF01259 (ECOD; PDBsum)
- AlphaFold: IPR001636; PF01259

In molecular biology, the protein domain SAICAR synthase is an enzyme which catalyses a reaction to create SAICAR. In enzymology, this enzyme is also known as phosphoribosylaminoimidazolesuccinocarboxamide synthase (EC 6.3.2.6). It is an enzyme that catalyzes the chemical reaction

ATP + 5-amino-1-(5-phospho-D-ribosyl)imidazole-4-carboxylate + L-aspartate $\rightleftharpoons$ ADP + phosphate + (S)-2-[5-amino-1-(5-phospho-D-ribosyl)imidazole-4-carboxamido]succinate

The 3 substrates of this enzyme are ATP, 5-amino-1-(5-phospho-D-ribosyl)imidazole-4-carboxylate, and L-aspartate, whereas its 3 products are ADP, phosphate, and (S)-2-[5-amino-1-(5-phospho-D-ribosyl)imidazole-4-carboxamido]succinate.

This enzyme belongs to the family of ligases, to be specific those forming carbon-nitrogen bonds as acid-D-amino-acid ligases (peptide synthases). The systematic name of this enzyme class is 5-amino-1-(5-phospho-D-ribosyl)imidazole-4-carboxylate:L-aspartate ligase (ADP-forming). This enzyme participates in purine metabolism.

This particular protein family is of huge importance as it is found in all three domains of life. It is the seventh step in the pathway of purine biosynthesis. Purines are vital to all cells as they are involved in energy metabolism and DNA synthesis. Furthermore, they are of specific interest to scientific researchers as the study of the purine biosynthesis pathway could lead to the development of chemotherapeutic drugs. This is because most cancers lack a salvage pathway for adenine nucleotides and rely entirely on the SAICAR pathway.

== Protein domain ==
This protein domain is found in eukaryotes, bacteria and archaea. It is vital for living organisms since it catalyses a step in the purine biosynthesis pathway which aids energy metabolism and DNA synthesis.

=== Protein domain function ===
In bacteria and plants this protein domain only catalyses the synthesis of SAICAR. However, in mammals it also catalyses phosphoribosylaminoimidazole carboxylase (AIRC) activity.

=== Protein domain structure ===
This particular protein is an octamer made up of 8 identical subunits. Each monomer consists of a central domain and a C-terminal alpha helix. The central domain consists of a five-stranded parallel beta sheet flanked by three alpha helices one side of the sheet and two alpha helices on the other, forming a three-layer (alpha beta alpha) sandwich.

== Structural studies ==
As of late 2007, 10 structures have been solved for this class of enzymes, with PDB accession codes PDB: 1A48, PDB: 1KUT, PDB: 1OBD, PDB: 1OBG, PDB: 2CNQ, PDB: 2CNU, PDB: 2CNV, PDB: 2GQR, PDB: 2GQS, and PDB: 2H31.

== Other common names ==
- phosphoribosylaminoimidazole-succinocarboxamide synthetase,
- PurC,
- SAICAR synthetase,
- 4-(N-succinocarboxamide)-5-aminoimidazole synthetase,
- 4-[(N-succinylamino)carbonyl]-5-aminoimidazole ribonucleotide,
- synthetase,
- SAICARs,
- phosphoribosylaminoimidazolesuccinocarboxamide synthetase,
- 5-aminoimidazole-4-N-succinocarboxamide ribonucleotide synthetase.
