= 5-(carboxyamino)imidazole ribonucleotide synthase =

Class of enzymes

5-(Carboxyamino)imidazole ribonucleotide synthase

Identifiers
- EC no.: 6.3.4.18

Databases
- IntEnz: IntEnz view
- BRENDA: BRENDA entry
- ExPASy: NiceZyme view
- KEGG: KEGG entry
- MetaCyc: metabolic pathway
- PRIAM: profile
- PDB structures: RCSB PDB PDBe PDBsum
Search
- PMC: articles
- PubMed: articles
- NCBI: proteins

In enzymology, a 5-(carboxyamino)imidazole ribonucleotide synthase (EC 6.3.4.18) is an enzyme that catalyzes the chemical reaction

ATP + 5-amino-1-(5-phospho-D-ribosyl)imidazole + HCO_{3}^{−} $\rightleftharpoons$ ADP + phosphate + 5-carboxyamino-1-(5-phospho-D-ribosyl)imidazole

The 3 substrates of this enzyme are ATP, 5-amino-1-(5-phospho-D-ribosyl)imidazole ("AIR"), and HCO_{3}^{−}, whereas its 3 products are ADP, phosphate, and 5-carboxyamino-1-(5-phospho-D-ribosyl)imidazole.

This enzyme belongs to the family of ligases, specifically those forming generic carbon-nitrogen bonds. The systematic name of this enzyme class is 5-amino-1-(5-phospho-D-ribosyl)imidazole:carbon-dioxide ligase (ADP-forming).
