= Amidophosphoribosyltransferase =

Mammalian protein found in Homo sapiens

PPAT
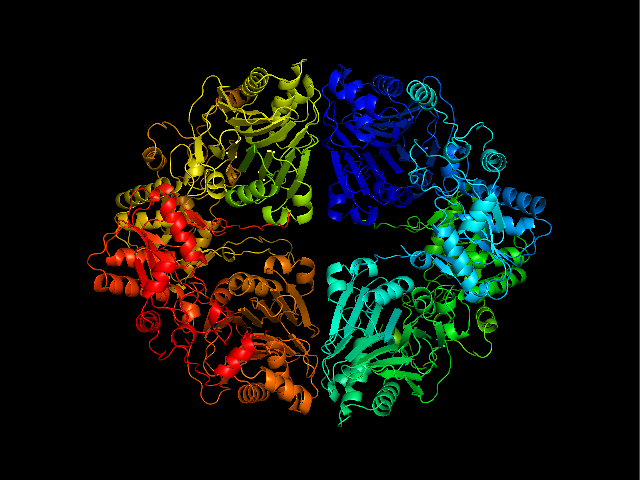

Identifiers
- Aliases: PPAT, ATASE, GPAT, PRAT, phosphoribosyl pyrophosphate amidotransferase, Amidophosphoribosyltransferase
- External IDs: OMIM: 172450; MGI: 2387203; GeneCards: PPAT
Enzyme activity
EC #	BRENDA	ExPASy	KEGG	MetaCyc
2.4.2.14	↗	↗	↗	↗

Gene location (Human)
Chr.	Chromosome 4 (human)
Band	4q12	Start	56,393,362 bp
Band	4q12	End	56,435,615 bp

Gene location (Mouse)
Chr.	Chromosome 5 (mouse)
Band	5|5 C3.3	Start	77,061,096 bp
Band	5|5 C3.3	End	77,099,425 bp
RNA expression pattern
Bgee	Human / Mouse (ortholog); Top expressed in: ventricular zone; testicle; gonad; ganglionic eminence; islet of Langerhans; stromal cell of endometrium; body of pancreas; Achilles tendon; rectum; right adrenal cortex / Top expressed in: primitive streak; morula; tail of embryo; somite; genital tubercle; epiblast; cumulus cell; embryo; embryo; abdominal wall; More reference expression data
BioGPS	n/a
Gene ontology
Molecular function	metal ion binding; transferase activity; catalytic activity; iron-sulfur cluster binding; glycosyltransferase activity; 4 iron, 4 sulfur cluster binding; amidophosphoribosyltransferase activity
Cellular component	cytosol
Biological process	glutamine metabolic process; 'de novo' IMP biosynthetic process; animal organ regeneration; cellular response to insulin stimulus; purine nucleobase biosynthetic process; maternal process involved in female pregnancy; metabolism; nucleoside metabolic process; kidney development; ribose phosphate metabolic process; purine nucleotide biosynthetic process; glutamine catabolic process; protein homotetramerization; lactation; purine ribonucleoside monophosphate biosynthetic process; G1/S transition of mitotic cell cycle
Sources:Amigo / QuickGO
Orthologs
Databases	NCBI: entry; OMA: entry
Species	Human	Mouse
Entrez	5471	231327
Ensembl	ENSG00000128059	ENSMUSG00000029246
UniProt	Q06203	Q8CIH9
RefSeq (mRNA)	NM_002703	NM_172146
RefSeq (protein)	NP_002694	NP_742158
Location (UCSC)	Chr 4: 56.39 – 56.44 Mb	Chr 5: 77.06 – 77.1 Mb
PubMed search
- Wikidata
View/Edit Human	View/Edit Mouse

Amidophosphoribosyltransferase (ATase), also known as glutamine phosphoribosylpyrophosphate amidotransferase (GPAT), is an enzyme responsible for catalyzing the conversion of 5-phosphoribosyl-1-pyrophosphate (PRPP) into 5-phosphoribosyl-1-amine (PRA), using the amine group from a glutamine side-chain. This is the committing step in de novo purine synthesis. In humans it is encoded by the PPAT (phosphoribosyl pyrophosphate amidotransferase) gene. ATase is a member of the purine/pyrimidine phosphoribosyltransferase family.

== Structure and function ==
amidophosphoribosyltransferase

Identifiers
- EC no.: 2.4.2.14
- CAS no.: 9031-82-7

Databases
- BRENDA: enzyme data
- ExPASy: NiceZyme view
- KEGG: enzyme entry
- MetaCyc: metabolic pathway
- Rhea: reactions
- PDB structures: RCSB PDB PDBe PDBsum
- Gene Ontology: AmiGO / QuickGO
Search
- PMC: articles
- PubMed: articles
- NCBI: proteins

The enzyme consists of two domains: a glutaminase domain that produces ammonia from glutamine by hydrolysis and a phosphoribosyltransferase domain that binds the ammonia to ribose-5-phosphate. Coordination between the two active sites of enzyme give it special complexity.

The glutaminase domain is homologous to other N-terminal nucleophile (Ntn) hydrolases such as carbamoyl phosphate synthetase (CPSase). Nine invariant residues among the sequences of all Ntn amidotransferases play key catalytic, substrate binding or structural roles. A terminal cysteine residue acts as the nucleophile in the first part of the reaction, analogous to the cysteine of a catalytic triad. The free N terminus acts as a base to activate the nucleophile and protonate the leaving group in the hydrolytic reaction, in this case ammonia. Another key aspect of the catalytic site is an oxyanion hole which catalyzes the reaction intermediate, as shown in the mechanism below.

The PRTase domain is homologous to many other PRTases involved in the purine nucleotide synthesis and salvage pathways. All PRTases involve the displacement of pyrophosphate in PRPP by a variety of nucleophiles. ATase is the only PRTase that has ammonia as a nucleophile. Pyrophosphate from PRPP is an excellent leaving group, so little chemical assistance is needed to promote catalysis. Rather, the primary function of the enzyme appears to be bringing the reactants together appropriately and preventing the wrong reaction, such as hydrolysis.

Besides having their respective catalytic abilities, the two domains also coordinate with one another to ensure that all the ammonia produced from glutamine is transferred to PRPP and no other nucleophile than ammonia attacks PRPP. This is achieved mainly by blocking formation of ammonia until PRPP is bound and channelling the ammonia to the PRTase active site.

Initial activation of the enzyme by PRPP is caused by a conformational change in a "glutamine loop", which repositions to be able to accept glutamine. This results in a 200-fold higher K_{m} value for glutamine binding Once glutamine has bound to the active site, further conformational changes bring the site into the enzyme, making it inaccessible.

These conformational changes also result in the formation of a 20 Å long ammonia channel, one of the most striking features of this enzyme. This channel lacks any hydrogen bonding sites, to ensure easy diffusion of ammonia from one active site to the other. This channel ensures ammonia released from glutamine reaches the PRTase catalytic site, and it differs from the channel in CPSase in that it is hydrophobic rather than polar, and transient rather than permanent.

== Reaction mechanism ==
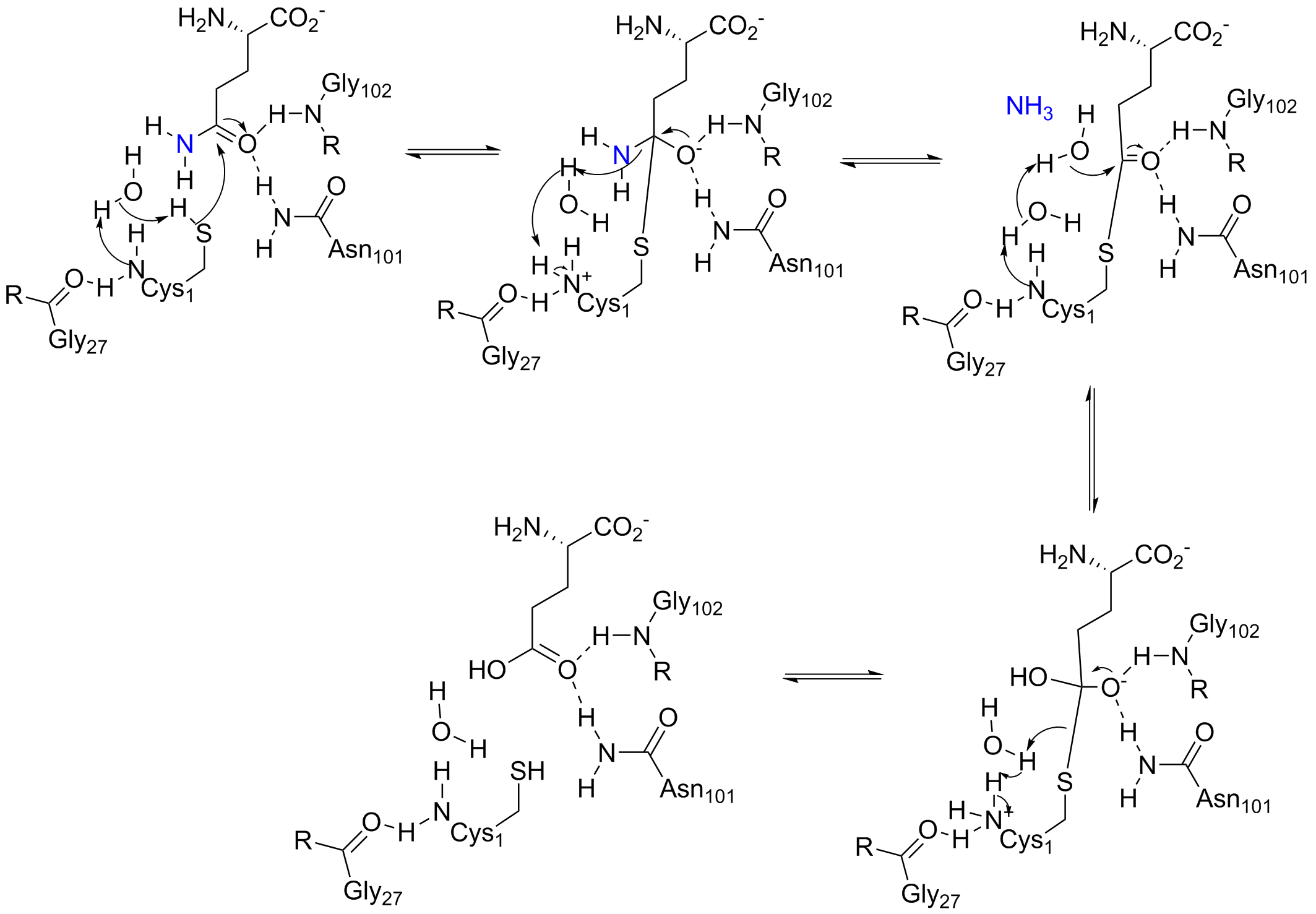
First half of the catalytic mechanism of ATase occurring in the glutaminase domain active site. The catalytic cysteine performs a nucleophilic attack on the substrate to form an acyl-enzyme intermediate, which is resolved by hydrolysis. Ammonia is produced in the third step, which is used in the second half of the mechanism.

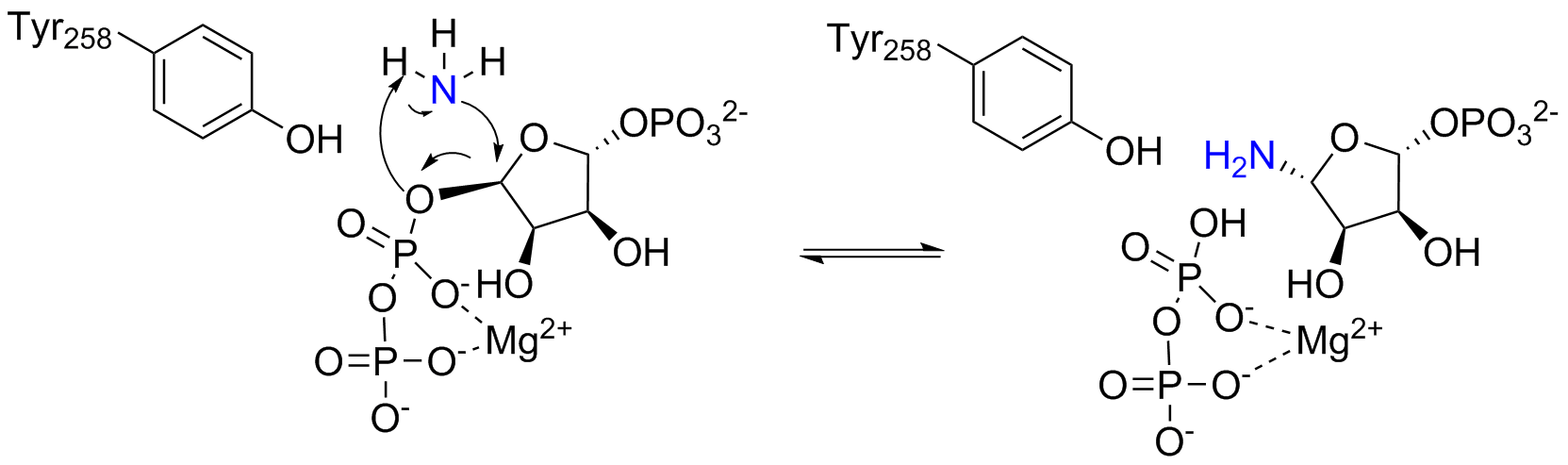
Second half of the catalytic mechanism of ATase occurring in the phosphoribosyltransferase domain active site. The ammonia liberated in the first half of the reaction replaces pyrophosphate in PRPP, yielding phosphoribosylamine. A tyrosine residue stabilizes the transition state and allows the reaction to occur.

The overall reaction catalyzed by ATase is the following:

PRPP + glutamine → PRA + glutamate + PPi

Within the enzyme, the reaction is broken down into two half-reactions that occur at different active sites:

1. glutamine → NH_{3} + glutamate
2. PRPP + NH_{3} → PRA + PPi

The first part of the mechanism occurs in the active site of the glutaminase domain and releases an ammonia group from glutamine by hydrolysis. The ammonia released by the first reaction is then transferred to the active site of the phosphoribosyltransferase domain via a 20 Å channel, where it then binds to PRPP to form PRA.

== Regulation ==
In an example of feedback inhibition, ATase is inhibited mainly by the end-products of the purine synthesis pathway, AMP, GMP, ADP, and GDP. Each enzyme subunit from the homotetramer has two binding sites for these inhibitors. The allosteric (A) site overlaps with the site for the ribose-5-phosphate of PRPP, while the catalytic (C) site overlaps with the site for the pyrophosphate of PRPP. The binding of specific nucleotide pairs to the two sites results in synergistic inhibition stronger than additive inhibition. Inhibition occurs via a structural change in the enzyme where the flexible glutamine loop gets locked in an open position, preventing the binding of PRPP.

Due to the chemical lability of PRA, which has a half-life of 38 seconds at pH 7.5 and 37 °C, researchers have suggested that the compound is channeled from Amidophosphoribosyltransferase to GAR synthetase in vivo.

== Interactive pathway map ==
Click on genes, proteins and metabolites below to link to respective articles. (Note: The interactive pathway map can be edited at WikiPathways: "FluoropyrimidineActivity_WP1601".)

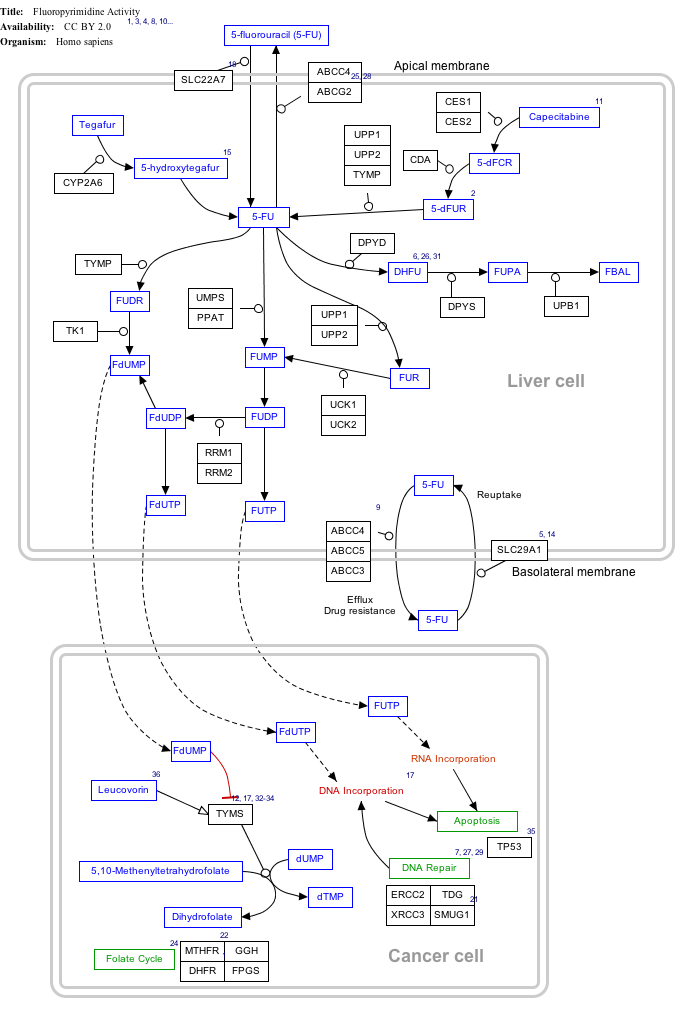

Fluorouracil (5-FU) Activity edit

== Gallery ==
PRPP

5-phosphoribosylamine
