= Nicotinate-nucleotide diphosphorylase (carboxylating) =

Class of enzymes

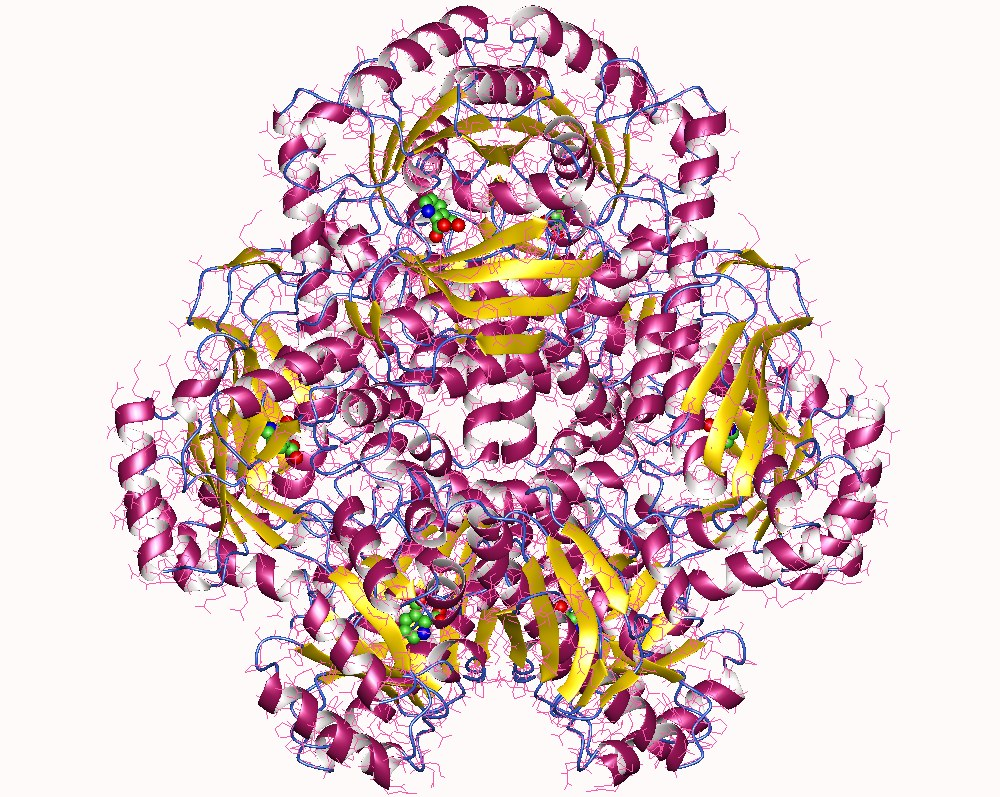
- Nicotinate-nucleotide pyrophosphorylase (carboxylating) hexamer, Human

Identifiers
- EC no.: 2.4.2.19
- CAS no.: 37277-74-0

Databases
- IntEnz: IntEnz view
- BRENDA: BRENDA entry
- ExPASy: NiceZyme view
- KEGG: KEGG entry
- MetaCyc: metabolic pathway
- PRIAM: profile
- PDB structures: RCSB PDB PDBe PDBsum
- Gene Ontology: AmiGO / QuickGO
Search
- PMC: articles
- PubMed: articles
- NCBI: proteins

Nicotinate-nucleotide diphosphorylase (carboxylating) (EC 2.4.2.19) is an enzyme that catalyzes the chemical reaction

phosphoribosyl pyrophosphate
+
quinolinic acid
CO_{2} + PP_{i}
nicotinate mononucleotide

The enzyme is named for the reaction in the direction from the nucleotide to quinolinic acid but in the mammalian liver only proceeds in the direction shown, with carbon dioxide and pyrophosphate (PP_{i}) as byproducts. This reaction is part of the biosythesis pathway to the coenzyme, nicotinamide adenine dinucleotide, in both plants and animals.

This enzyme is a glycosyltransferase, specifically a pentosyltransferase. The systematic name of this enzyme class is nicotinate-nucleotide:diphosphate phospho-alpha-D-ribosyltransferase (carboxylating). Other names in common use include quinolinate phosphoribosyltransferase (decarboxylating), quinolinic acid phosphoribosyltransferase, QAPRTase, NAD+ pyrophosphorylase, nicotinate mononucleotide pyrophosphorylase (carboxylating), and quinolinic phosphoribosyltransferase.

== Structural studies ==
As of late 2007, 9 structures have been solved for this class of enzymes, with PDB accession codes 1QAP, 1QPN, 1QPO, 1QPQ, 1QPR, 1X1O, 2B7N, 2B7P, and 2B7Q.
