= 5-(carboxyamino)imidazole ribonucleotide mutase =

Class of enzymes

Identifiers
- EC no.: 5.4.99.18

Databases
- IntEnz: IntEnz view
- BRENDA: BRENDA entry
- ExPASy: NiceZyme view
- KEGG: KEGG entry
- MetaCyc: metabolic pathway
- PRIAM: profile
- PDB structures: RCSB PDB PDBe PDBsum
Search
- PMC: articles
- PubMed: articles
- NCBI: proteins

In enzymology, a 5-(carboxyamino)imidazole ribonucleotide mutase (EC 5.4.99.18) is an enzyme that catalyzes the chemical reaction

5-carboxyamino-1-(5-phospho-D-ribosyl)imidazole $\rightleftharpoons$ 5-amino-1-(5-phospho-D-ribosyl)imidazole-4-carboxylate

Hence, this enzyme has one substrate, 5-carboxyamino-1-(5-phospho-D-ribosyl)imidazole, and one product, 5-amino-1-(5-phospho-D-ribosyl)imidazole-4-carboxylate.

This enzyme belongs to the family of isomerases, specifically those intramolecular transferases transferring other groups. The systematic name of this enzyme class is 5-carboxyamino-1-(5-phospho-D-ribosyl)imidazole carboxymutase. Other names in common use include N5-CAIR mutase, PurE, N5-carboxyaminoimidazole ribonucleotide mutase, and class I PurE.
