= Nucleotidase =

Class of enzymes

Identifiers
- EC no.: 3.1.3.31
- CAS no.: 9033-33-4

Databases
- IntEnz: IntEnz view
- BRENDA: BRENDA entry
- ExPASy: NiceZyme view
- KEGG: KEGG entry
- MetaCyc: metabolic pathway
- PRIAM: profile
- PDB structures: RCSB PDB PDBe PDBsum
Search
- PMC: articles
- PubMed: articles
- NCBI: proteins

A nucleotidase is a hydrolytic enzyme that catalyzes the hydrolysis of a nucleotide into a nucleoside and a phosphate.

A nucleotide + H_{2}O = a nucleoside + phosphate

For example, it converts adenosine monophosphate to adenosine, and guanosine monophosphate to guanosine.

Nucleotidases have an important function in digestion in that they break down consumed nucleic acids.

They can be divided into two categories, based upon the end that is hydrolyzed:

- EC 3.1.3.5: 5′-nucleotidase - NT5C, NT5C1A, NT5C1B, NT5C2, NT5C3
- EC 3.1.3.6: 3′-nucleotidase - NT3

5′-nucleotidases cleave off the phosphate from the 5′ end of the sugar moiety. They can be classified into various kinds depending on their substrate preferences and subcellular localization. Membrane-bound 5′-nucleotidases display specificity toward adenosine monophosphates and are involved predominantly in the salvage of preformed nucleotides and in signal transduction cascades involving purinergic receptors. Soluble 5′-nucleotidases are all known to belong to the haloacid dehalogenase superfamily of enzymes, which are two domain proteins characterised by a modified Rossman fold as the core and variable cap or hood. The soluble forms are further subclassified based on the criterion mentioned above. mdN and cdN are mitochondrial and cytosolic 5′-3′-pyrimidine nucleotidases. cN-I is a cytosolic nucleotidase(cN) characterized by its affinity toward AMP as its substrate. cN-II is identified by its affinity toward either IMP or GMP or both. cN-III is a pyrimidine 5′-nucleotidase. A new class of nucleotidases called IMP-specific 5′-nucleotidase has been recently defined. 5′-nucleotidases are involved in varied functions such as cell–cell communication, nucleic acid repair, purine salvage pathway for the synthesis of nucleotides, signal transduction, membrane transport, etc.
