= 5′-Phosphoribosyl-4-carboxy-5-aminoimidazole =

Names
- IUPAC name 5-Amino-1-(5-O-phosphono-β-D-ribofuranosyl)-1H-imidazole-4-carboxylic acid
- Systematic IUPAC name 5-Amino-1-{(2R,3R,4S,5R)-3,4-dihydroxy-5-[(phosphonooxy)methyl]oxolan-2-yl}-1H-imidazole-4-carboxylic acid
- Other names Carboxyaminoimidazole ribotide, Carboxyaminoimidazole ribonucleotide, CAIR,

Identifiers
CAS Number	6001-14-5
3D model (JSmol)	Interactive image; Interactive image
ChEBI	CHEBI:28413
ChemSpider	144983
PubChem CID	165388
UNII	5MA501Z5DO
CompTox Dashboard (EPA)	DTXSID50208716
- InChI: InChI=1S/C9H14N3O9P/c10-7-4(9(15)16)11-2-12(7)8-6(14)5(13)3(21-8)1-20-22(17,18)19/h2-3,5-6,8,13-14H,1,10H2,(H,15,16)(H2,17,18,19)/t3-,5-,6-,8-/m1/s1 Key: XFVULMDJZXYMSG-ZIYNGMLESA-N; InChI=1/C9H14N3O9P/c10-7-4(9(15)16)11-2-12(7)8-6(14)5(13)3(21-8)1-20-22(17,18)19/h2-3,5-6,8,13-14H,1,10H2,(H,15,16)(H2,17,18,19)/t3-,5-,6-,8-/m1/s1 Key: XFVULMDJZXYMSG-ZIYNGMLEBD
- SMILES: C1=NC(=C(N1[C@H]2[C@@H]([C@@H]([C@H](O2)COP(=O)(O)O)O)O)N)C(=O)O; O=P(O)(O)OC[C@H]2O[C@@H](n1cnc(C(=O)O)c1N)[C@H](O)[C@@H]2O

Properties
Chemical formula	C_{9}H_{14}N_{3}O_{9}P
Molar mass	339.196 g/mol
- Except where otherwise noted, data are given for materials in their standard state (at 25 °C [77 °F], 100 kPa). verify (what is ?) Infobox references

5′-Phosphoribosyl-4-carboxy-5-aminoimidazole (or CAIR) is an intermediate in the de novo biosynthesis of purines.

It is formed from 5-aminoimidazole ribotide (AIR) by phosphoribosylaminoimidazole carboxylase (AIR carboxylase). In Escherichia coli this conversion requires two enzymes: PurK converts AIR to N^{5}-carboxyaminoimidazole ribonucleotide (N^{5}-CAIR), and PurE converts N^{5}-CAIR to CAIR. In Gallus gallus (the chicken).
