= Phosphoribosylformylglycinamidine synthase =

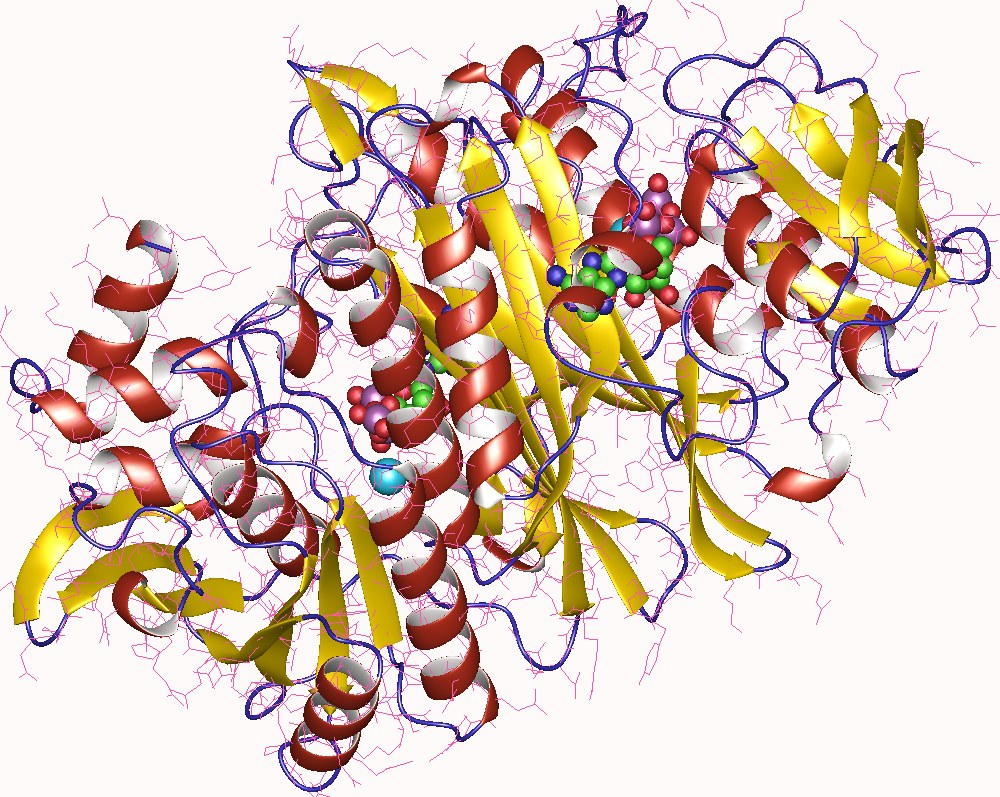
- FGAM synthase II monomer, Thermotoga maritima

Identifiers
- EC no.: 6.3.5.3
- CAS no.: 9032-84-2

Databases
- BRENDA: enzyme data
- ExPASy: NiceZyme view
- KEGG: enzyme entry
- MetaCyc: metabolic pathway
- Rhea: reactions
- PDB structures: RCSB PDB PDBe PDBsum
- Gene Ontology: AmiGO / QuickGO
Search
- PMC: articles
- PubMed: articles
- NCBI: proteins

PFAS

Identifiers
- Aliases: PFAS, FGAMS, FGAR-AT, FGARAT, PURL, phosphoribosylformylglycinamidine synthase, GATD8
- External IDs: OMIM: 602133; MGI: 2684864; GeneCards: PFAS
Enzyme activity
EC #	BRENDA	ExPASy	KEGG	MetaCyc
6.3.5.3	↗	↗	↗	↗

Gene location (Human)
Chr.	Chromosome 17 (human)
Band	17p13.1	Start	8,247,618 bp
Band	17p13.1	End	8,270,491 bp

Gene location (Mouse)
Chr.	Chromosome 11 (mouse)
Band	11|11 B3	Start	68,876,523 bp
Band	11|11 B3	End	68,899,286 bp
RNA expression pattern
Bgee	Human / Mouse (ortholog); Top expressed in: ventricular zone; embryo; ganglionic eminence; epithelium of colon; gonad; right ovary; right adrenal gland; right lobe of thyroid gland; left ovary; left adrenal cortex / Top expressed in: epiblast; hand; abdominal wall; primitive streak; cumulus cell; vas deferens; embryo; ureter; otolith organ; utricle; More reference expression data
BioGPS	n/a
Gene ontology
Molecular function	nucleotide binding; ligase activity; metal ion binding; phosphoribosylformylglycinamidine synthase activity; ATP binding
Cellular component	cytosol; extracellular exosome; cytoplasm
Biological process	'de novo' IMP biosynthetic process; purine ribonucleoside monophosphate biosynthetic process; purine nucleotide biosynthetic process; glutamine metabolic process; ribonucleoside monophosphate biosynthetic process; anterior head development
Sources:Amigo / QuickGO
Orthologs
Databases	NCBI: entry; OMA: entry
Species	Human	Mouse
Entrez	5198	237823
Ensembl	ENSG00000178921	ENSMUSG00000020899
UniProt	O15067; Q6P4B4	Q5SUR0
RefSeq (mRNA)	NM_012393	NM_001159519
RefSeq (protein)	NP_036525; NP_036525.1	NP_001152991
Location (UCSC)	Chr 17: 8.25 – 8.27 Mb	Chr 11: 68.88 – 68.9 Mb
PubMed search
- Wikidata
View/Edit Human	View/Edit Mouse

Phosphoribosylformylglycinamidine synthase (EC 6.3.5.3) is an enzyme that in humans is encoded by the gene PFAS. More broadly, phosphoribosylformylglycinamidine synthases are enzymes that catalyze the chemical reaction

ATP + N_{2}-formyl-N_{1}-(5-phospho-D-ribosyl)glycinamide + L-glutamine + H_{2}O $\rightleftharpoons$ ADP + phosphate + 2-(formamido)-N_{1}-(5-phospho-D-ribosyl)acetamidine + L-glutamate

The 4 substrates of this enzyme are ATP, N2-formyl-N1-(5-phospho-D-ribosyl)glycinamide, L-glutamine, and H_{2}O, whereas its 4 products are ADP, phosphate, 2-(formamido)-N1-(5-phospho-D-ribosyl)acetamidine, and L-glutamate.

This enzyme belongs to the family of ligases, specifically those forming carbon-nitrogen bonds carbon-nitrogen ligases with glutamine as amido-N-donor. The systematic name of this enzyme class is N2-formyl-N1-(5-phospho-D-ribosyl)glycinamide:L-glutamine amido-ligase (ADP-forming). Other names in common use include phosphoribosylformylglycinamidine synthetase, formylglycinamide ribonucloetide amidotransferase, phosphoribosylformylglycineamidine synthetase, FGAM synthetase, FGAR amidotransferase, 5'-phosphoribosylformylglycinamide:L-glutamine amido-ligase, (ADP-forming), 2-N-formyl-1-N-(5-phospho-D-ribosyl)glycinamide:L-glutamine, and amido-ligase (ADP-forming).

It is known as ADE6 in Saccharomyces cerevisiae (budding yeast) genetics.

== Structural studies ==
As of late 2007, 8 structures have been solved for this class of enzymes, with PDB accession codes PDB: 1T3T, PDB: 1VK3, PDB: 1VQ3, PDB: 2HRU, PDB: 2HRY, PDB: 2HS0, PDB: 2HS3, and PDB: 2HS4.

== Regulation ==
This enzyme participates in purine metabolism. Oncogenic and physiological signals lead to the ERK-dependent PFAS phosphorylation at the T619 site, stimulating de novo purine synthesis flux. In addition, ERK-mediated PFAS phosphorylation is required for cell and tumor growth.
