= Cystathionine beta-lyase =

Enzyme

cystathionine beta-lyase
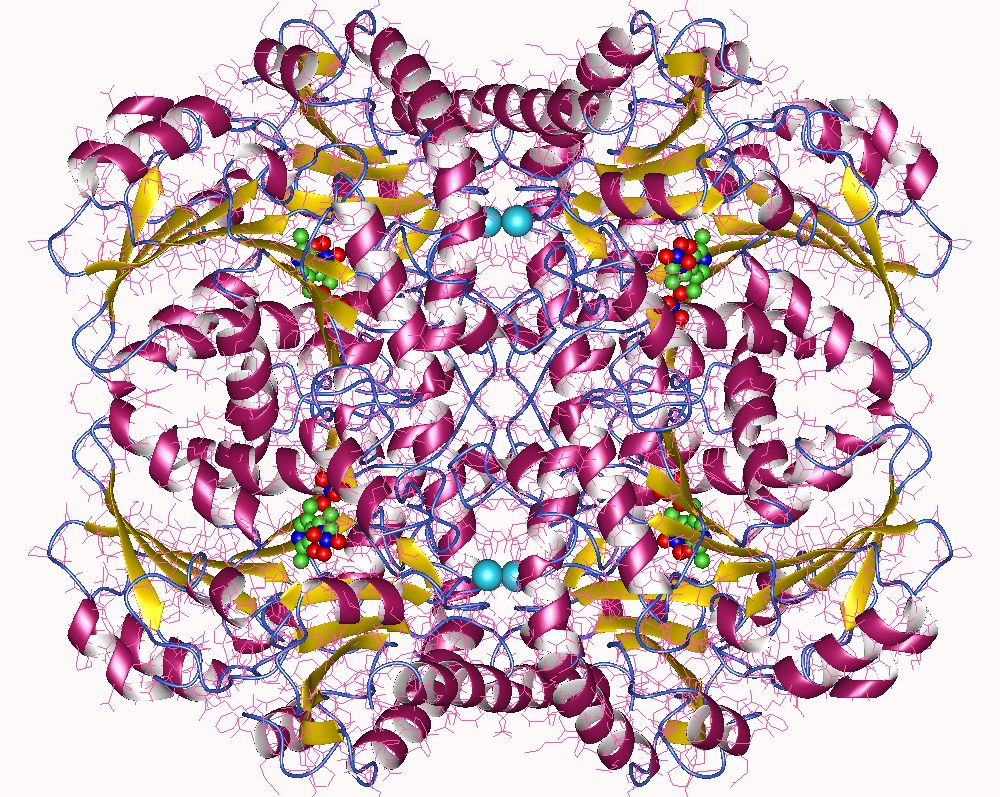
- Cystathionine beta-lyase tetramer, E.Coli

Identifiers
- EC no.: 4.4.1.8
- CAS no.: 9055-05-4

Databases
- BRENDA: enzyme data
- ExPASy: NiceZyme view
- KEGG: enzyme entry
- MetaCyc: metabolic pathway
- Rhea: reactions
- PDB structures: RCSB PDB PDBe PDBsum
- Gene Ontology: AmiGO / QuickGO
Search
- PMC: articles
- PubMed: articles
- NCBI: proteins

Cystathionine beta-lyase (EC 4.4.1.8), also commonly referred to as CBL or β-cystathionase, is an enzyme that primarily catalyzes the following α,β-elimination reaction

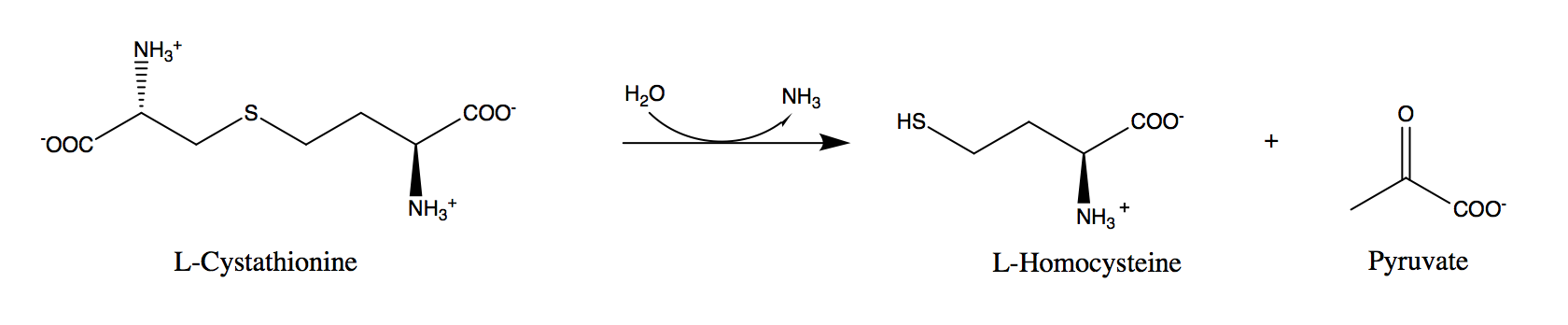
Reaction catalyzed by cystathionine beta-lyase

Thus, the substrate of this enzyme is L-cystathionine, whereas its 3 products are homocysteine, pyruvate, and ammonia.

Found in plants, bacteria, and yeast, cystathionine beta-lyase is an essential part of the methionine biosynthesis pathway as homocysteine can be directly converted into methionine by methionine synthase. The enzyme belongs to the γ-family of PLP-dependent enzymes due to its use of a pyridoxal-5'-phosphate (PLP) cofactor to cleave cystathionine. The enzyme also belongs to the family of lyases, specifically the class of carbon-sulfur lyases. The systematic name of this enzyme class is L-cystathionine L-homocysteine-lyase (deaminating; pyruvate-forming). This enzyme participates in 5 metabolic pathways: methionine metabolism, cysteine metabolism, selenoamino acid metabolism, nitrogen metabolism, and sulfur metabolism.

== Structure ==
Cystathionine beta-lyase is a tetramer composed of identical subunits, and is constructed as a dimer of dimers, each associated with one molecule of PLP bound to the catalytic site by a lysine residue. The dimer is formed by two monomers associated through several electrostatic, hydrogen bonding, and hydrophobic interactions, whereas the tetramer is stabilized through interactions between the N-terminal domains and key α-helices.

Most of the enzyme's catalytic site residues are conserved amongst the enzymes involved in the transsulfuration pathway. Other members include cystathionine gamma-synthase, cystathionine gamma-lyase, and methionine gamma lyase. Additionally, these structures exhibit a type I fold and belong to the aspartate aminotransferase (AAT) family, characterized by homodimers with dihedral symmetry and active sites composed of residues belonging to adjacent subunits.

Cystathionine beta-lyase dimer. N-terminal domain shown in green, PLP-binding domain shown in red, and C-terminal domain shown in cyan. PDB entry: 4ITX

=== Monomer ===
The cystathionine beta-lyase monomer consists of three functionally and structurally distinct domains:

==== N-terminal domain ====
Composed of three α-helices and one beta-strand that contribute to the formation of the quaternary structure. This domain contains residues that interact with the active site of the neighboring subunit to facilitate substrate and cofactor binding.

==== PLP-binding domain ====
Contains most of the catalytically relevant residues on the enzyme. It is composed of α-helices and β-sheets with a distinct parallel seven-stranded β-sheet. These sheets form a curved structure around the PLP-binding helix. PLP is covalently attached to a lysine residue at the C-terminus of the sheet.

==== C-terminal domain ====
Smallest domain on the enzyme, which is attached to the PLP-binding domain by a long, kinked α-helix. The domain is structured into four-stranded antiparallel β-sheet with neighboring helices.

=== Catalytic site ===
Aside from being bound to a lysine residue, PLP is fixed within the substrate binding site of the enzyme through various interactions with catalytic residues. Amine- and hydroxyl-containing residues are located in hydrogen bonding distance to the four phosphate oxygens. This phosphate group is considered to be the main contributor to securing PLP in the active site. Additionally, residues neighboring the pyridine nitrogen in PLP help stabilize its positive charge, thereby increasing its electrophilic character.

The aromatic ring in PLP is fixed in place by an almost coplanar tyrosine residue. It is believed that this configuration increases the electron sink character of the cofactor. These stacking interactions between PLP and aromatic side chains can be found in most PLP-dependent enzymes as it plays an important role in catalyzing the reaction by facilitating transaldimination.

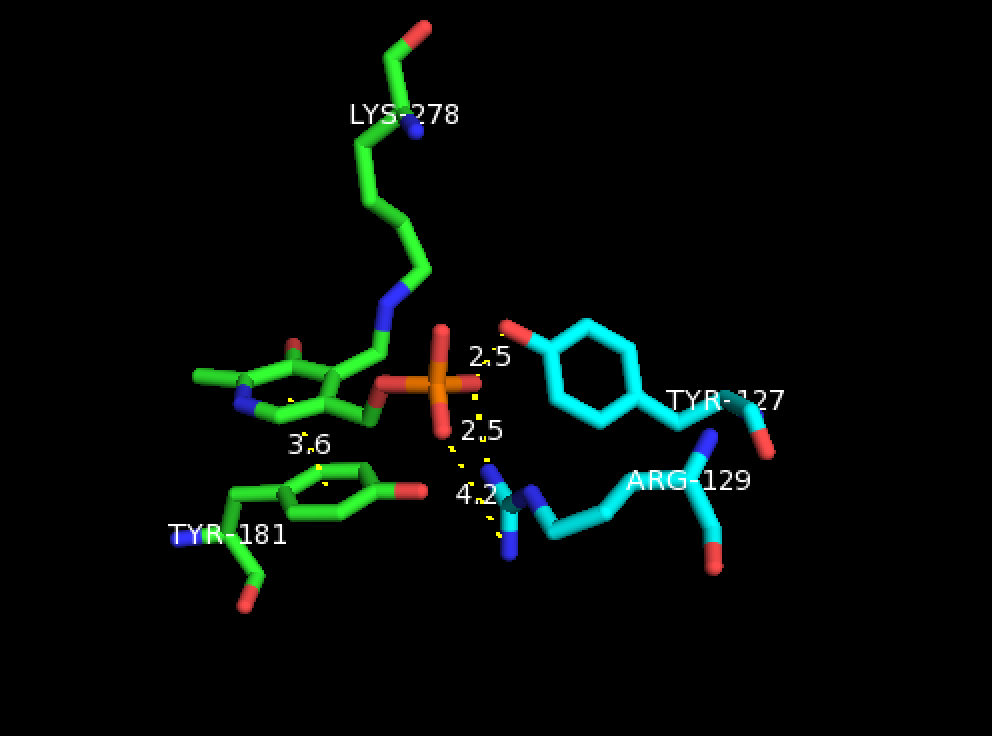
Key binding domain residues interacting with PLP. Residues belonging to the adjacent Arabidopsis CBL subunit are shown in blue. PDB entry: 1IBJ

== Mechanism ==
As shown in the mechanism below, cystathionine beta-lyase facilitates the S-C bond cleavage in cystathionine with the use of a PLP cofactor bounded to a catalytic lysine residue. Initially, a deprotonated amino group is needed to perform the transaldimination reaction. Given that the pH optimum for the enzyme is between 8.0 and 9.0, a tyrosine residue in the catalytic pocket exists as a phenolate, which abstracts a proton from the α-amino group of the substrate. In the next step, the deprotonated amine undergoes a nucleophilic attack and displaces the lysine to form a Schiff base, forming an internal aldimine.

The released lysine can now abstract the proton from the C^{α} and form a quinoid intermediate, which is facilitated by the delocalization of the negative charge over PLP's conjugated p-system. Subsequently, the protonation of S^{γ} induces C^{β}-S^{γ} bond cleavage, thereby releasing homocysteine

The external aldimine is displaced by the nucleophilic attack of the lysine, regenerating the catalytically active internal aldimine and releasing dehydroalanine. Lastly, the enamine tautomerizes into an imine that undergoes hydrolytic deamination to form pyruvate and ammonia.

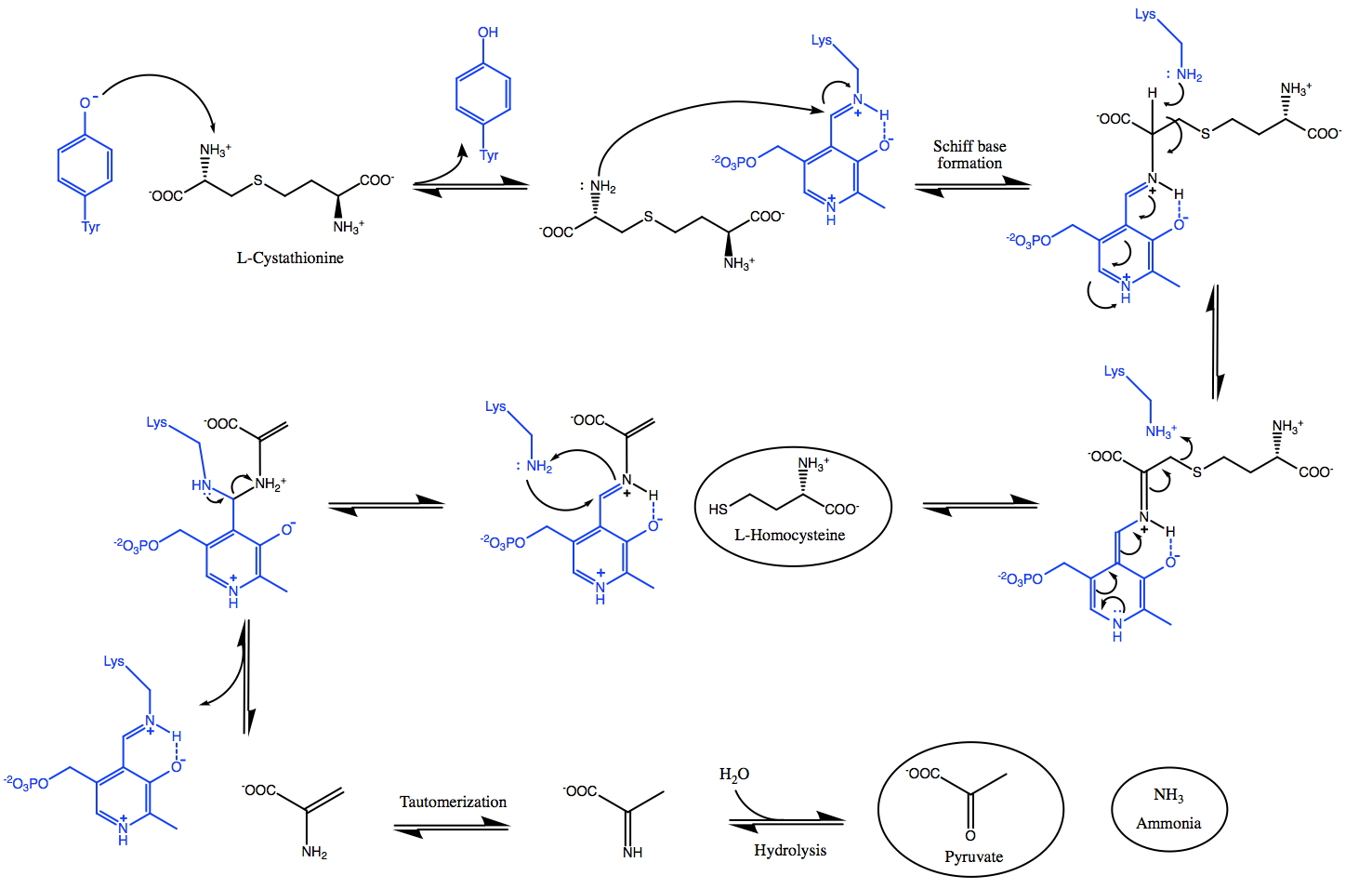
Mechanism catalyzed by cystathionine beta-lyase. Cofactor and catalytic residues are shown in blue.

== Inhibition ==
Plant and bacterial cystathionine beta-lyases are inhibited by the antimicrobial amino acid, L-aminoethoxyvinylglycine (AVG), and the antibacterial amino acid, rhizobitoxine.

=== Plants ===
Cystathionine beta-lyase in plants exhibits a two-step mechanism inactivation process with AVG, in which a reversible enzyme-inhibitor complex is formed before the irreversible inactivation of the enzyme:

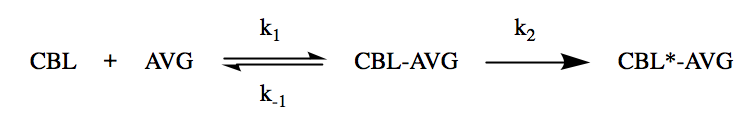

Excess addition of cystathionine prevented the inactivation of the enzyme, suggesting that AVG acts as a competitive inhibitor with respect to cystathionine. Additionally, the enzyme has been shown to be sensitive to thiol-blocking inhibitors, such as N-ethylmaleimide and iodoacetamide.

=== Bacteria ===
Unlike in plants, Cystathionine beta-lyase in bacteria exhibits a one-step inhibition mechanism:

Through kinetic methods and X-ray crystallography, a time-dependent, slow-binding inhibition was observed. It is believed that the inhibitor binds to the enzyme in a similar way as the substrate; however, after the abstraction of the α-proton, the reaction proceeds to create an inactive ketimine PLP derivative.

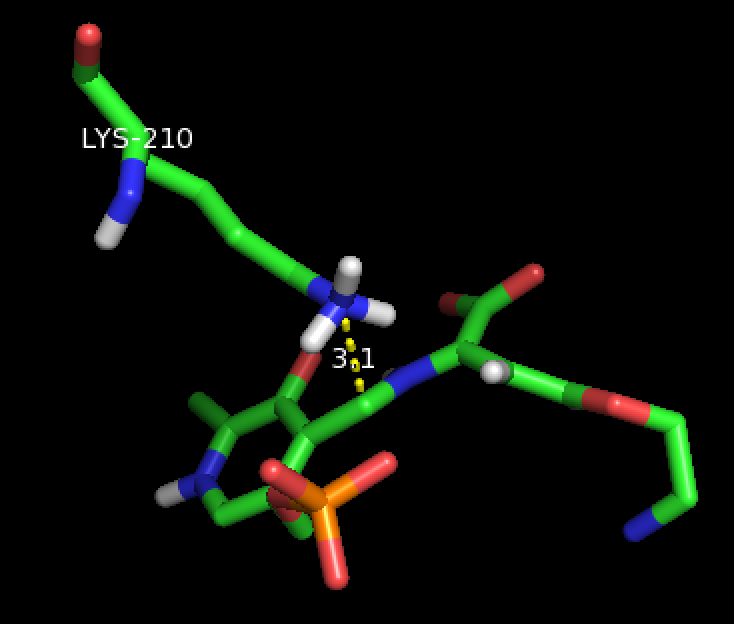
AVG bounded to catalytic PLP in the substrate binding site of E. coli CBL. PDB entry: 1CL2

== Evolution ==
Arabidopsis cystathionine beta-lyase possesses 22% homology with its Escherichia coli counterpart and even higher homology (between 28% and 36%) with cystathionine γ-synthase from plant and bacterial sources and cystathionine γ-lyase from Saccharomyces cerevisiae. All of these enzymes are involved in the Cys/Met biosynthetic pathway and belong to the same class of PLP-dependent enzymes, suggesting that these enzymes were derived from a common ancestor.

== Industrial relevance ==
Cystathionine beta-lyase catalyzes the production of homocysteine, a direct precursor to methionine. Methionine is an essential amino acid for bacteria that is required for protein synthesis and the synthesis of S-adenosylmethionine; thus, the amino acid is directly linked to DNA replication. Because of its necessity in DNA replication, inhibition of cystathionine beta-lyase is an attractive antibiotic target. Furthermore, the enzyme is absent in humans, decreasing the chance of harmful and unwanted side effects.

Studies have linked the anti-fungal activity of several anti-fungal agents to the inhibition of cystathionine beta-lyase; however, other studies have not observed enzyme inhibition by these. Further research is needed to characterize the full extent cystathionine beta-lyase inhibition has on microbial and fungal growth.
