= Homoserine O-acetyltransferase =

Enzyme

Identifiers
- EC no.: 2.3.1.31
- CAS no.: 9030-72-2

Databases
- IntEnz: IntEnz view
- BRENDA: BRENDA entry
- ExPASy: NiceZyme view
- KEGG: KEGG entry
- MetaCyc: metabolic pathway
- PRIAM: profile
- PDB structures: RCSB PDB PDBe PDBsum
- Gene Ontology: AmiGO / QuickGO
Search
- PMC: articles
- PubMed: articles
- NCBI: proteins

Homoserine O-acetyltransferase (EC 2.3.1.31) is an enzyme that catalyzes the chemical reaction

homoserine
+
acetyl-CoA
O-acetyl-homoserine
+ coenzyme A

The two substrates of this enzyme characterised from Neurospora are homoserine and acetyl-CoA. Its products are O-acetyl-homoserine and coenzyme A.

This enzyme belongs to the family of transferases, specifically those acyltransferases transferring groups other than aminoacyl groups. The systematic name of this enzyme class is acetyl-CoA:L-homoserine O-acetyltransferase. Other names in common use include homoserine acetyltransferase, homoserine transacetylase, homoserine-O-transacetylase, and L-homoserine O-acetyltransferase. This enzyme participates in cysteine and methionine metabolism.

== Structural studies ==
As of late 2007, only one structure has been solved for this class of enzymes, with the PDB accession code 2B61.
