= Yeast mitochondrial code =

Mitochondrial genetic code in yeasts

The yeast mitochondrial code (translation table 3) is a genetic code used by the mitochondrial genome of yeasts, notably Saccharomyces cerevisiae, Candida glabrata, Hansenula saturnus, and Kluyveromyces thermotolerans.

== The code ==
AAs = FFLLSSSSYY**CCWWTTTTPPPPHHQQRRRRIIMMTTTTNNKKSSRRVVVVAAAADDEEGGGG
Starts = ---M---------------M---------------M---------------M------------
Base1 = TTTTTTTTTTTTTTTTCCCCCCCCCCCCCCCCAAAAAAAAAAAAAAAAGGGGGGGGGGGGGGGG
Base2 = TTTTCCCCAAAAGGGGTTTTCCCCAAAAGGGGTTTTCCCCAAAAGGGGTTTTCCCCAAAAGGGG
Base3 = TCAGTCAGTCAGTCAGTCAGTCAGTCAGTCAGTCAGTCAGTCAGTCAGTCAGTCAGTCAGTCAG

Bases: adenine (A), cytosine (C), guanine (G) and thymine (T) or uracil (U).

Amino acids: Alanine (Ala, A), Arginine (Arg, R), Asparagine (Asn, N), Aspartic acid (Asp, D), Cysteine (Cys, C), Glutamic acid (Glu, E), Glutamine (Gln, Q), Glycine (Gly, G), Histidine (His, H), Isoleucine (Ile, I), Leucine (Leu, L), Lysine (Lys, K), Methionine (Met, M), Phenylalanine (Phe, F), Proline (Pro, P), Serine (Ser, S), Threonine (Thr, T), Tryptophan (Trp, W), Tyrosine (Tyr, Y), Valine (Val, V).

== Differences from the standard code ==
DNA codons	RNA codons	This code (3)	Standard code (1)
ATA	AUA	Met (M)	Ile (I)
CTT	CUU	Thr (T)	Leu (L)
CTC	CUC	Thr (T)	Leu (L)
CTA	CUA	Thr (T)	Leu (L)
CTG	CUG	Thr (T)	Leu (L)
TGA	UGA	Trp (W)	STOP = Ter (*)
CGA	CGA	Absent	Arg (R)
CGC	CGC	Absent	Arg (R)

- The remaining CGN codons are rare in Saccharomyces cerevisiae and absent in Candida glabrata.
- The AUA codon is common in the gene var1 coding for the single mitochondrial ribosomal protein, but rare in genes encoding the enzymes.
- The coding assignments of the AUA (Met or Ile) and CUU (possibly Leu, not Thr) are uncertain in Hansenula saturnus.
- The coding assignment of Thr to CUN is uncertain in Kluyveromyces thermotolerans.

== See also ==
- List of genetic codes
