= Agmatidine =

Names
- IUPAC name N-(4-Carbamimidamidobutyl)-4-imino-1-(β-D-ribofuranosyl)-1,4-dihydro-2-pyrimidinamine

Identifiers
| CAS Number | 1221169-70-5 |
| 3D model (JSmol) | Interactive image |
| ChEBI | CHEBI:64329 |
| ChemSpider | 24604125 |
| PubChem CID | 44593871 |
| UNII | RD252EB5W3 |
| CompTox Dashboard (EPA) | DTXSID701029783 |
- InChI: InChI=1S/C14H25N7O4/c15-9-3-6-21(12-11(24)10(23)8(7-22)25-12)14(20-9)19-5-2-1-4-18-13(16)17/h3,6,8,10-12,22-24H,1-2,4-5,7H2,(H2,15,19,20)(H4,16,17,18)/t8-,10-,11-,12-/m1/s1 Key: NHQSDCRALZPVAJ-HJQYOEGKSA-N; InChI=1/C14H25N7O4/c15-9-3-6-21(12-11(24)10(23)8(7-22)25-12)14(20-9)19-5-2-1-4-18-13(16)17/h3,6,8,10-12,22-24H,1-2,4-5,7H2,(H2,15,19,20)(H4,16,17,18)/t8-,10-,11-,12-/m1/s1 Key: NHQSDCRALZPVAJ-HJQYOEGKBR
- SMILES: c1cn(c(nc1=N)NCCCCNC(=N)N)[C@H]2[C@@H]([C@@H]([C@H](O2)CO)O)O

Properties
| Chemical formula | C_{14}H_{25}N_{7}O_{4} |
| Molar mass | 355.399 g·mol^{−1} |
- Except where otherwise noted, data are given for materials in their standard state (at 25 °C [77 °F], 100 kPa). Infobox references

Agmatidine (2-agmatinylcytidine, symbol C^{+} or agm^{2}C) is a modified cytidine present in the wobble position of the anticodon of several archaeal AUA decoding tRNAs. Agmatidine is essential for correct decoding of the AUA codon in many archaea and is required for aminoacylation of tRNA^{Ile}_{2} with isoleucine.

== Introduction ==
The genetic code describes how triplet codons on mRNA are translated into protein sequences by specific tRNA molecules which can base-pair with the codons. Precise decoding of the genetic code is a fundamental pre-requisite for long-term survival of all organisms. The nature of the anticodon decides the specificity of hydrogen bonding and hence the accuracy of decoding by tRNAs. To date, a variety of post-transcriptional modifications have been discovered which aid tRNAs in increasing their repertoire of hydrogen bonding capacities. These modifications usually occur on the first base on the anticodon (position 34 or the wobble base position) which base pairs with the third base on the codon and are critical in specific recognition of codons by tRNAs.

The wobble rules of Crick propose how a limited set of tRNAs can decode a wider set of codons by use of wobble base pairing. These rules have been successful in explaining how most of the genetic code is specifically translated by a limited number of tRNAs. For example, a single phenylalanine tRNA with G in the first anticodon position can base pair with either U or C (thus decoding UUU and UUC) and a single leucine tRNA with a modified U (2-thioU) in the anticodon can base pair with either A or G (thus decoding UUA and UUG).

== The mechanism of AUA decoding ==
The mechanism of decoding in the box containing AUU, AUC, AUA (all coding for isoleucine) and AUG (coding for methionine) has remained a puzzle for scientists since long. AUU and AUC are decoded by a single isoleucine tRNA (tRNA^{Ile}_{1}) which has G in the anticodon while AUA is decoded by a separate tRNA (tRNA^{Ile}_{2}). How the second isoleucine tRNA decodes AUA without also decoding AUG has been a subject of much interest over the years.

Different classes of organisms solve the problem of AUA decoding differently. For example, in eukaryotes, a tRNA having inosine at position 34 (IAU anticodon) can decode all three isoleucine codons, while a tRNA having pseudouridine in the anticodon (ψAψ) anticodon can specifically read the AUA codon. In eubacteria, a tRNA having lysidine in the anticodon (LAU) can specifically decode AUA, but not AUG. However, the mechanism by which Archaea solve the problem of AUA decoding was not known till early 2010, when two groups simultaneously published reports that archaeal tRNA^{Ile}_{2} contains a modified cytidine at position 34, which was named agmatidine.

== Structure and Biosynthesis ==
Agmatidine is similar to lysidine in that the C2-oxo group of cytidine is replaced by the aminoguanidine agmatine instead of by lysine in the case of lysidine. The modification is carried out by the enzyme tRNA^{Ile}_{2} 2-agmatinylcytidine synthetase, a product of the gene tiaS present in many archaeal members. Agmatidine is generated in the cell by attachment of agmatine to the C2-oxo group of cytidine by TiaS. Agmatine in turn is a decarboxylation product of arginine (an aminoacid present in all cells).

Agmatidine formation occurs through a three-step mechanism. In step one, TiaS hydrolyzes the α-β phosphodiester bond of ATP to produce AMP and PPi. In step two, the C2 carbonyl oxygen of C34 attacks the γ-phosphorus atom to form the p-C34 intermediate, releasing β-Pi. This is in contrast to the mechanism of lysidine formation where the C2-oxo group is activated by adenylation instead of phosphorylation. In step three, the primary amino group of agmatine attacks the C2 carbon of the p-C34 intermediate to release γ-Pi and form agm^{2}C. TiaS also autophosphorylates its Thr18 with the γ-phosphate of ATP, releasing AMP and β-Pi. This is known to be important for agm^{2}C formation although its exact role is not clear.

== Physiology ==
Conjugation of agmatine moiety at the C2 carbon of C34 induces a tautomeric conversion of C34 which alters its hydrogen bonding pattern, enabling it to pair with adenosine instead of guanosine. The modification is essential for decoding of AUA codons and a tRNA without the modification is not aminoacylated with isoleucine. Moreover, it has been shown that agmatine is an essential metabolite for the viability of Thermococcus kodakaraensis.

The currently sequenced euryarchaeal and crenarchaeal genomes contain only one annotated isoleucine tRNA and three tRNAs with the CAU anticodon (annotated as methionine tRNAs). Therefore, it is very likely that most if not all of these archaeal clades use agmatidine modification to selectively read AUA codons. However, currently sequenced genomes from nanoarchaea and korarchaea contain two isoleucine tRNAs, one of which has UAU anticodon (which is probably converted into ψAψ in-vivo). Therefore, it is thought that these classes of archaea follow a eukaryote-like strategy to solve the AUA decoding problem.
