= O-acetylhomoserine aminocarboxypropyltransferase =

Class of enzymes

Identifiers
- EC no.: 2.5.1.49
- CAS no.: 37290-90-7

Databases
- IntEnz: IntEnz view
- BRENDA: BRENDA entry
- ExPASy: NiceZyme view
- KEGG: KEGG entry
- MetaCyc: metabolic pathway
- PRIAM: profile
- PDB structures: RCSB PDB PDBe PDBsum
- Gene Ontology: AmiGO / QuickGO
Search
- PMC: articles
- PubMed: articles
- NCBI: proteins

O-acetylhomoserine aminocarboxypropyltransferase (EC 2.5.1.49) is an enzyme that catalyzes the chemical reaction

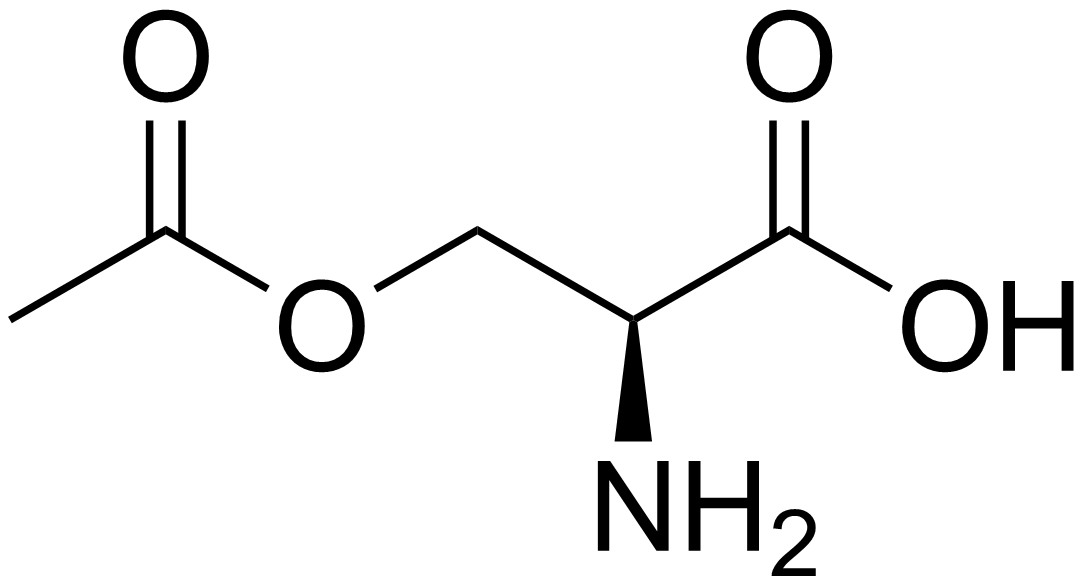
O-acetylserine
CH_{3}SH
acetic acid
+
methionine

The two substrates of this enzyme first characterised from the genus Neurospora are O-acetylhomoserine and methanethiol (CH_{3}SH). Its products are acetic acid and methionine. The equivalent enzyme in baker's yeast has been shown to use pyridoxal as a cofactor and is capable of using hydrogen sulfide in place of methanethiol, giving cysteine.

This enzyme is a transferase, specifically those transferring aryl or alkyl groups other than methyl groups. The systematic name of this enzyme class is O-acetyl-L-homoserine:methanethiol 3-amino-3-carboxypropyltransferase. Other names in common use include O-acetyl-L-homoserine acetate-lyase (adding methanethiol), O-acetyl-L-homoserine sulfhydrolase, O-acetylhomoserine (thiol)-lyase, O-acetylhomoserine sulfhydrolase, and methionine synthase. The gene from Thermus thermophilus has been studied.
