= Methionine gamma-lyase =

methionine γ-lyase
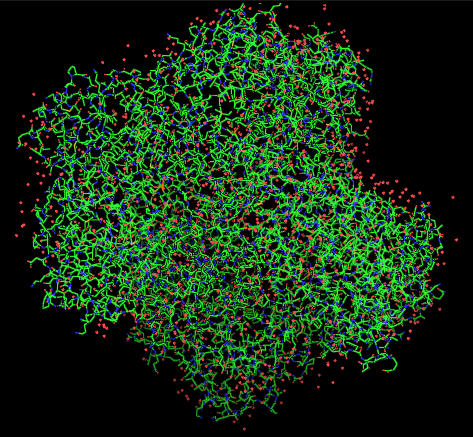
- Structure of a methionine gamma-lyase subunit, generated from 1GC2

Identifiers
- EC no.: 4.4.1.11
- CAS no.: 42616-25-1

Databases
- IntEnz: IntEnz view
- BRENDA: BRENDA entry
- ExPASy: NiceZyme view
- KEGG: KEGG entry
- MetaCyc: metabolic pathway
- PRIAM: profile
- PDB structures: RCSB PDB PDBe PDBsum
- Gene Ontology: AmiGO / QuickGO
Search
- PMC: articles
- PubMed: articles
- NCBI: proteins

The enzyme methionine γ-lyase (EC 4.4.1.11, MGL) is in the γ-family of PLP-dependent enzymes. It degrades sulfur-containing amino acids to α-keto acids, ammonia, and thiols:

L-methionine + H_{2}O = methanethiol + NH_{3} + 2-oxobutanoate (overall reaction)

(1a) L-methionine = methanethiol + 2-aminobut-2-enoate
(1b) 2-aminobut-2-enoate = 2-iminobutanoate (spontaneous)
(1c) 2-iminobutanoate + H_{2}O = 2-oxobutanoate + NH_{3} (spontaneous)

Because sulfur-containing amino acids play a role in multiple biological processes, the regulation of these amino acids is essential. Additionally, it is crucial to maintain low homocysteine levels for the proper functioning of various pathways and for preventing the toxic effects of the cysteine homologue. Methionine γ-lyase has been found in several bacteria (Clostridiums porogenes, Pseudomonas ovalis, Pseudomonas putida, Aeromonas sp., Citrobacter intermedius, Brevibacterium linens, Citrobacter freundii, Porphyromonas gingivalis, Treponema denticola), parasitic protozoa (Trichomonas vaginalis, Entamoeba histolytica), and plants (Arabidopsis thaliana).

This enzyme belongs to the family of lyases, specifically the class of carbon-sulfur lyases. The systematic name of this enzyme class is L-methionine methanethiol-lyase (deaminating; 2-oxobutanoate-forming). Other names in common use include L-methioninase, methionine lyase, methioninase, methionine dethiomethylase, L-methionine γ-lyase, and L-methionine methanethiol-lyase (deaminating). This enzyme participates in selenoamino acid metabolism. It employs one cofactor, pyridoxal phosphate.

== Structure ==
The enzyme is made up of 389-441 amino acids and forms four identical subunits. The active molecule is composed of two tightly associated dimers, the interface at which lies the active site. Each of the dimers has a pyridoxal 5’-phosphate (PLP) cofactor. Six amino acids located near the active site are involved in the reaction, namely Tyr59, Arg61, Tyr114, Cys116, Lys240, and Asp241. Unlike the other amino acids, Cys116 is not typically found in PLP γ-family enzymes, which instead have glycine or proline. Although there is no direct contact between Cys116 and either MGL or the methionine substrate, studies show that the amino acid is involved in retaining substrate specificity.

== Reaction mechanism ==
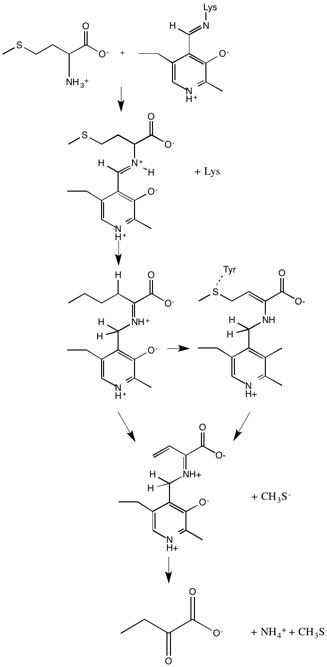
Mechanism of methionine gamma-lyase

In enzymology, a methionine gamma-lyase (EC 4.4.1.11) is an enzyme that catalyzes the chemical reaction

L-methionine + H_{2}O $\rightleftharpoons$ methanethiol + NH_{3} + 2-oxobutanoate

Thus, the two substrates of this enzyme are L-methionine and H_{2}O, whereas its 3 products are methanethiol, NH_{3}, and 2-oxobutanoate.

MGL also catalyzes α, β-elimination L-cysteine, degradation of O-substituted serine or homoserine, β- or γ-replacement, as well as deamination and γ-addition of L-vinylglycine. The reaction mechanism initially consists of the amino group of the substrate connected by a Schiff-base linkage to PLP. When a lysine residue replaces the amino group, an external aldimine is formed and hydrogens from the substrate are shifted to PLP. A neighboring tyrosine amino acid acts as an acid catalyst and attacks the substrate, consequently eliminating the thiol group from the substrate. Lastly, α-keto acid and ammonia are released from PLP.

== Function ==
Because MGL has differing substrate specificity among organisms, the enzyme also has varying physiological roles among organisms. In anaerobic bacteria and parasitic protozoa, MGL generates 2-oxobutyrate from methionine. 2-oxobutyrate is ultimately decomposed by acetate-CoA ligase and produces ATP, thus contributing to ATP metabolism. MGL also plays a role in the pathogenicity of periodontal bacterium such as P. gingivalis. A study finds a correlation between the presence of MGL and an increase in mice survival after subcutaneous injection of the bacteria. In B. linens, a cheese ripening bacterium, MGL activity is tightly linked with carbohydrate metabolism.

In plants, MGL mRNA is found in dry seeds although the protein itself is not. However, the enzyme is highly expressed in wet seeds, suggesting that MGL is a vital part of early germination. MGL may also be involved in the formation of volatile sulfur compounds such as methanethiol on damaged plant leaves to defend against insects. However, it is undetermined whether MGL is present in guava, which was first discovered to have this protection mechanism, and whether other plants use a similar technique.

Isozymes of MGL are only found in the parasitic protists E. histolytica and T. vaginalis. The isozymes differ in their ability to efficiently degrade methionine, homocysteine, and cysteine. E. histolytica MGL is derived from archaea MGL whereas T. vaginalis MGL share more similarities with bacterial MGL. Therefore, the inclusion of MGL in the genome of these two species occurred independently.

== Drug development ==
Trifluoromethionine (TFM) is a fluorinated methionine prodrug, which only presents its toxicity after degradation by MGL. Studies show that TFM is toxic to and slows the growth of anaerobic microorganisms (Mycobacterium smegmatis, Mycobacterium phlei, Candida lipolytica), periodontal bacteria (P. gingivalis, F. nucleatum), and parasitic protists (E. histolytica, T. vaginalis). Studies have shown that TFM is also efficacious in vivo. Furthermore, TFM has limited toxicity to mammalian cells, which do not have MGL. Therefore, TFM only exhibits toxic effects on pathogens that contain MGL.

== Cancer therapy ==
Some tumors, such as glioblastomas, medulloblastoma, and neuroblastoma, are much more sensitive to the methionine starvation than the normal tissues. Therefore, methionine depletion arises as a relevant therapeutical approach to treat cancer. For that reason, MGL has been studied to decrease the methionine levels in the blood serum and decrease the tumor growth and also to kill, by starvation, those malignant cells.
