= Methanethiol oxidase =

Enzyme

methanethiol oxidase

Identifiers
- EC no.: 1.8.3.4
- CAS no.: 112821-28-0

Databases
- IntEnz: IntEnz view
- BRENDA: BRENDA entry
- ExPASy: NiceZyme view
- KEGG: KEGG entry
- MetaCyc: metabolic pathway
- PRIAM: profile
- PDB structures: RCSB PDB PDBe PDBsum
- Gene Ontology: AmiGO / QuickGO
Search
- PMC: articles
- PubMed: articles
- NCBI: proteins

In enzymology, a methanethiol oxidase (EC 1.8.3.4) is an enzyme that catalyzes the chemical reaction

methanethiol + O_{2} + H_{2}O $\rightleftharpoons$ formaldehyde + hydrogen sulfide + H_{2}O_{2}

The 3 substrates of this enzyme are methanethiol, O_{2}, and H_{2}O, whereas its 3 products are formaldehyde, hydrogen sulfide, and H_{2}O_{2}.

This enzyme belongs to the family of oxidoreductases, specifically those acting on a sulfur group of donors with oxygen as acceptor. The systematic name of this enzyme class is methanethiol:oxygen oxidoreductase. Other names in common use include methylmercaptan oxidase, methyl mercaptan oxidase, (MM)-oxidase, and MT-oxidase.
