= Homoserine O-succinyltransferase =

Enzyme

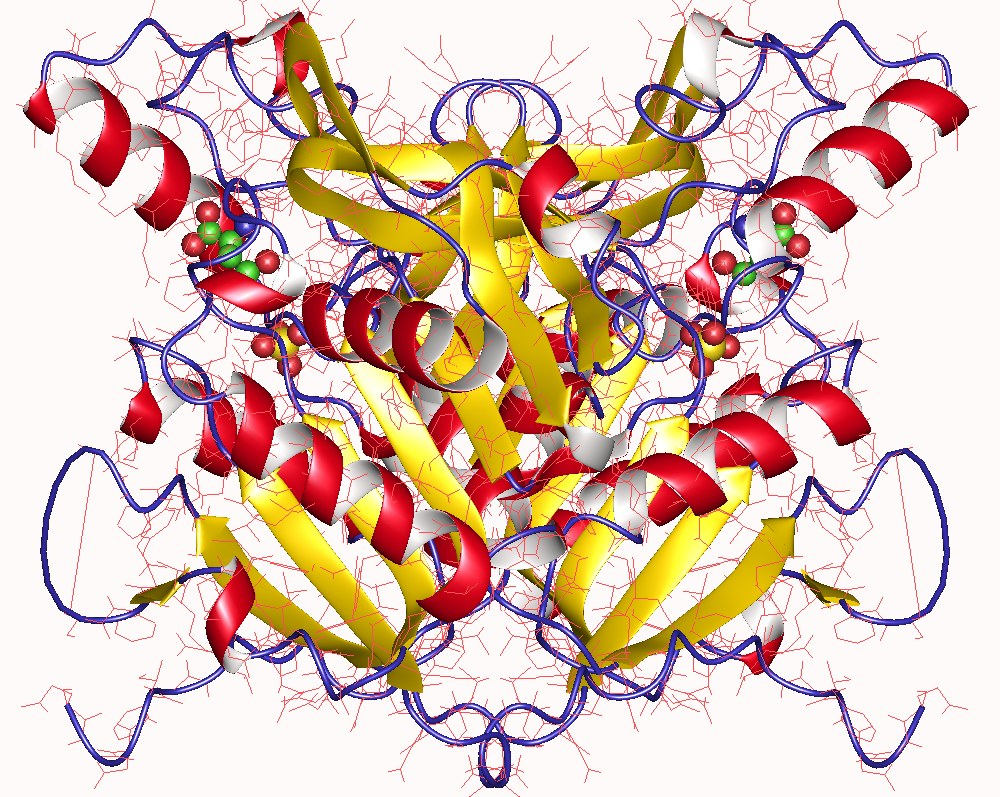
- Homoserine O-acetyltransferase dimer, Bacillus cereus

Identifiers
- EC no.: 2.3.1.46
- CAS no.: 62213-51-8

Databases
- IntEnz: IntEnz view
- BRENDA: BRENDA entry
- ExPASy: NiceZyme view
- KEGG: KEGG entry
- MetaCyc: metabolic pathway
- PRIAM: profile
- PDB structures: RCSB PDB PDBe PDBsum
- Gene Ontology: AmiGO / QuickGO
Search
- PMC: articles
- PubMed: articles
- NCBI: proteins

Homoserine O-succinyltransferase (EC 2.3.1.46) is an enzyme that catalyzes the chemical reaction

homoserine
+
succinyl-CoA
O-succinyl-L-homoserine
+ coenzyme A

The two substrates of this enzyme characterised from Escherichia coli are homoserine and succinyl-CoA. Its products are O-succinyl-L-homoserine and coenzyme A.

This enzyme belongs to the family of transferases, specifically those acyltransferases transferring groups other than aminoacyl groups. The systematic name of this enzyme class is succinyl-CoA:L-homoserine O-succinyltransferase. Other names in common use include homoserine O-transsuccinylase, and homoserine succinyltransferase. It participates in cysteine and methionine metabolism.

== Structural studies ==
As of late 2016, three structures have been solved for this class of enzymes, with PDB accession codes 2GHR, 2H2W, and 2VDJ.
