= Cystathionine gamma-synthase =

Class of enzymes

cystathionine gamma-synthase
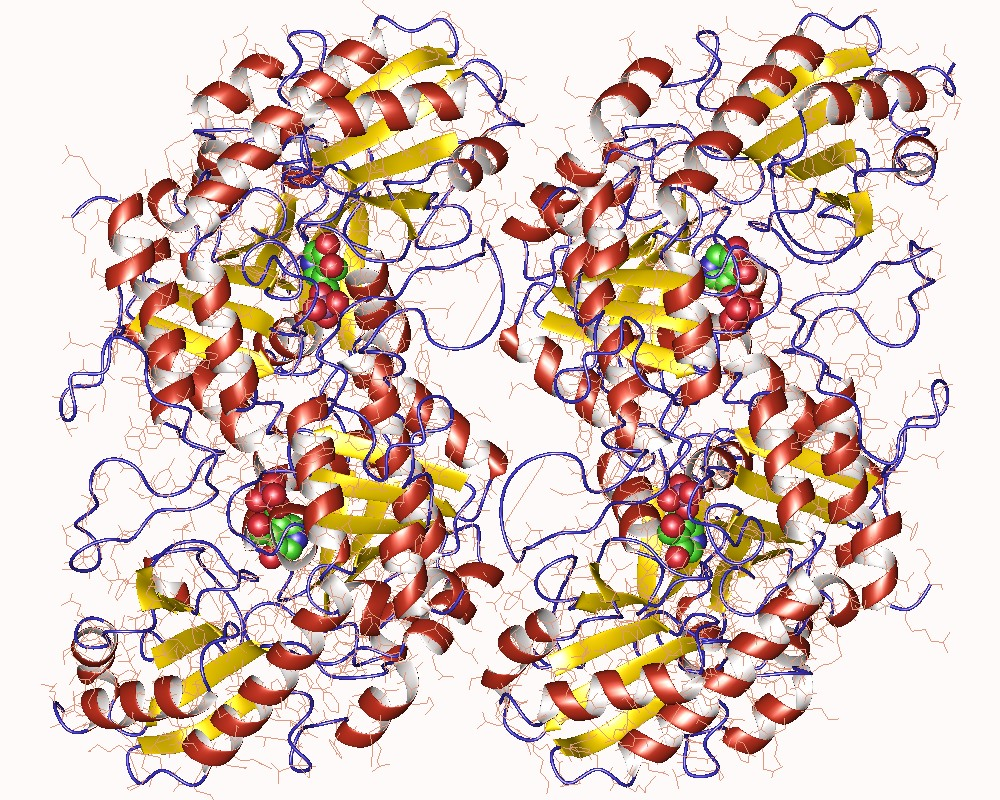
- Cystathionine gamma-synthase homotetramer, Helicobacter pylori

Identifiers
- EC no.: 2.5.1.48
- CAS no.: 9030-70-0

Databases
- BRENDA: enzyme data
- ExPASy: NiceZyme view
- KEGG: enzyme entry
- MetaCyc: metabolic pathway
- Rhea: reactions
- PDB structures: RCSB PDB PDBe PDBsum
- Gene Ontology: AmiGO / QuickGO
Search
- PMC: articles
- PubMed: articles
- NCBI: proteins

In enzymology, a cystathionine gamma-synthase (EC 2.5.1.48) is an enzyme that catalyzes the formation of cystathionine from cysteine and an activated derivative of homoserine, e.g.:

O^{4}-succinyl-L-homoserine + L-cysteine $\longrightarrow$ L-cystathionine + succinate

In microorganisms, the activated substrate of this enzyme is O4-succinyl-L-homoserine or O4-acetyl-L-homoserine. Cystathionine gamma-synthase from plants uses L-homoserine phosphate instead.

This enzyme belongs to the family of transferases, specifically those transferring aryl or alkyl groups other than methyl groups. The systematic name of this enzyme class is O4-succinyl-L-homoserine:L-cysteine S-(3-amino-3-carboxypropyl)transferase. Other names in common use include O-succinyl-L-homoserine succinate-lyase (adding cysteine), O-succinylhomoserine (thiol)-lyase, homoserine O-transsuccinylase, O-succinylhomoserine synthase, O-succinylhomoserine synthetase, cystathionine synthase, cystathionine synthetase, homoserine transsuccinylase, 4-O-succinyl-L-homoserine:L-cysteine, and S-(3-amino-3-carboxypropyl)transferase. This enzyme participates in 4 metabolic pathways: methionine metabolism, cysteine metabolism, selenoamino acid metabolism, and sulfur metabolism. It employs one cofactor, pyridoxal phosphate.
