= Homoserine kinase =

Enzyme

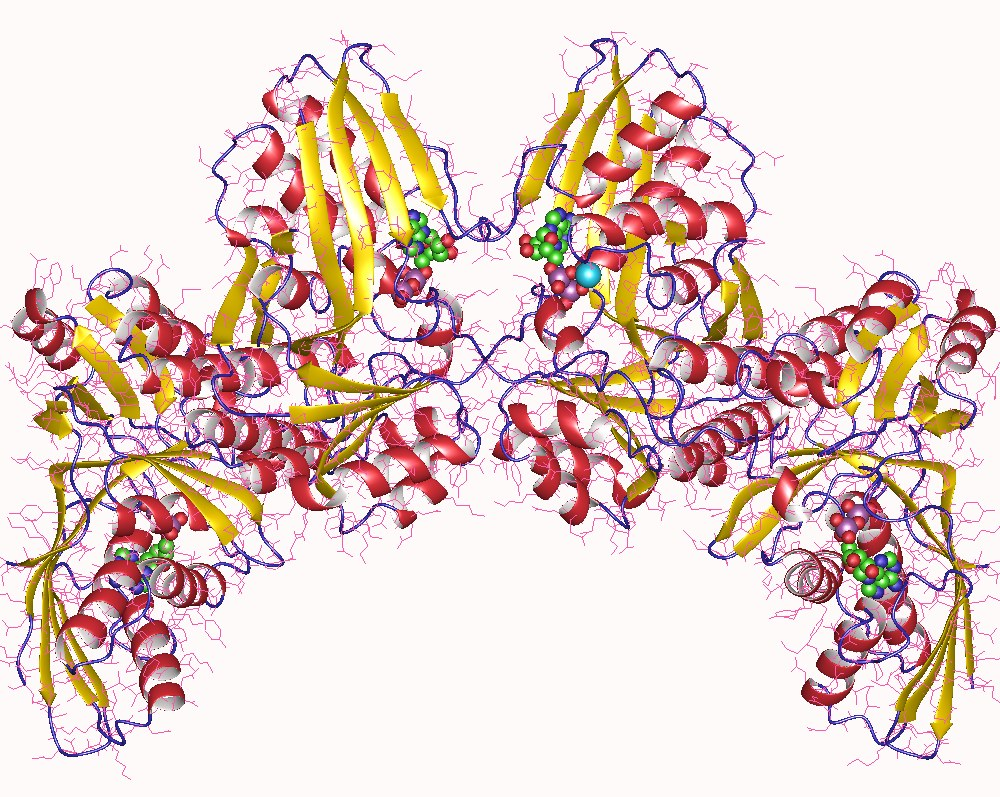
- Homoserine kinase tetramer, Methanocaldococcus jannaschii

Identifiers
- EC no.: 2.7.1.39
- CAS no.: 9026-58-8

Databases
- IntEnz: IntEnz view
- BRENDA: BRENDA entry
- ExPASy: NiceZyme view
- KEGG: KEGG entry
- MetaCyc: metabolic pathway
- PRIAM: profile
- PDB structures: RCSB PDB PDBe PDBsum
- Gene Ontology: AmiGO / QuickGO
Search
- PMC: articles
- PubMed: articles
- NCBI: proteins

Homoserine kinase (EC 2.7.1.39) is an enzyme that catalyzes the chemical reaction

ATP +
homoserine
ADP +
O-phospho-L-homoserine

The enzyme characterised from baker's yeast and Neurospora converts homoserine to O-phospho-L-homoserine by transferring a phosphate group from the cofactor, adenosine triphosphate (ATP), which is converted to adenosine diphosphate (ADP). This is part of the biosynthetic pathway to the amino acid, threonine.

This enzyme is a transferase, specifically one transferring phosphorus-containing groups (phosphotransferases) with an alcohol group as acceptor. The systematic name of this enzyme class is ATP:L-homoserine O-phosphotransferase. Other names in common use include homoserine kinase (phosphorylating), and HSK.

== Structural studies ==
As of late 2007, 6 structures have been solved for this class of enzymes, with PDB accession codes PDB: 1FWK, PDB: 1FWL, PDB: 1H72, PDB: 1H73, PDB: 1H74, and PDB: 2PPQ.
