= Sodium methanethiolate =

Names
- Preferred IUPAC name Sodium methanethiolate
- Other names sodium thiomethoxide, sodium methyl mercaptide, sodium thiomethylate, methanethiol sodium salt, methyl mercaptan sodium salt, MeSNa

Identifiers
CAS Number	5188-07-8
3D model (JSmol)	Interactive image
ChemSpider	71198
ECHA InfoCard	100.023.609
EC Number	225-969-9
PubChem CID	4378561
UNII	LB29JWW8H7
CompTox Dashboard (EPA)	DTXSID7027592
- InChI: InChI=1S/CH4S.Na/c1-2;/h2H,1H3;/q;+1/p-1 Key: RMBAVIFYHOYIFM-UHFFFAOYSA-M; InChI=1/CH4S.Na/c1-2;/h2H,1H3;/q;+1/p-1
- SMILES: [Na+].[S-]C

Properties
Chemical formula	CH_{3}NaS
Molar mass	70.08 g·mol^{−1}
Appearance	white
Density	1.43 g/cm^{3}
Melting point	88–90 °C (190–194 °F; 361–363 K)
Solubility in water	soluble
- Except where otherwise noted, data are given for materials in their standard state (at 25 °C [77 °F], 100 kPa). verify (what is ?) Infobox references

Sodium methanethiolate or sodium thiomethoxide is an organosulfur compound with the formula CH_{3}SNa. It is the sodium salt of the conjugate base of methanethiol. This compound is commercially available as a white solid that is soluble in polar organic solvents. Sodium methanethiolate is a reagent in organic synthesis and a byproduct of some industrial processes. Hydrolysis of sodium methanethiolate, e.g. in humid air, produces methanethiol, which has a low odor threshold and a noxious "rotten egg" smell.

== Preparation ==
Sodium methanethiolate can be produced by treating a solution of methanethiol in an etherial solvent with sodium hydride:

CH_{3}SH + NaH → CH_{3}SNa + H_{2}

It is also prepared and used in situ (i.e., without isolation) by treatment of a solution of methanethiol with strong base such as sodium hydroxide.

== Reactions ==
Sodium methanethiolate is a source of methanethiolate, a powerful nucleophile. It is used to cleave methoxy-aryl ethers:

NaSCH_{3} + Ar−O−CH_{3} → Ar−ONa + CH_{3}SCH_{3} (Ar = aryl)

It converts alkyl halides to methyl thioethers:

NaSCH_{3} + RX → RSCH_{3} + NaX (X = halogen, R = alkyl)

Oxidation of sodium methanethiolate gives dimethyldisulfide:

2 NaSCH_{3} + I_{2} → CH_{3}SSCH_{3} + 2 NaI
