= Methionine (data page) =

Chemical data page

The complete data for Methionine
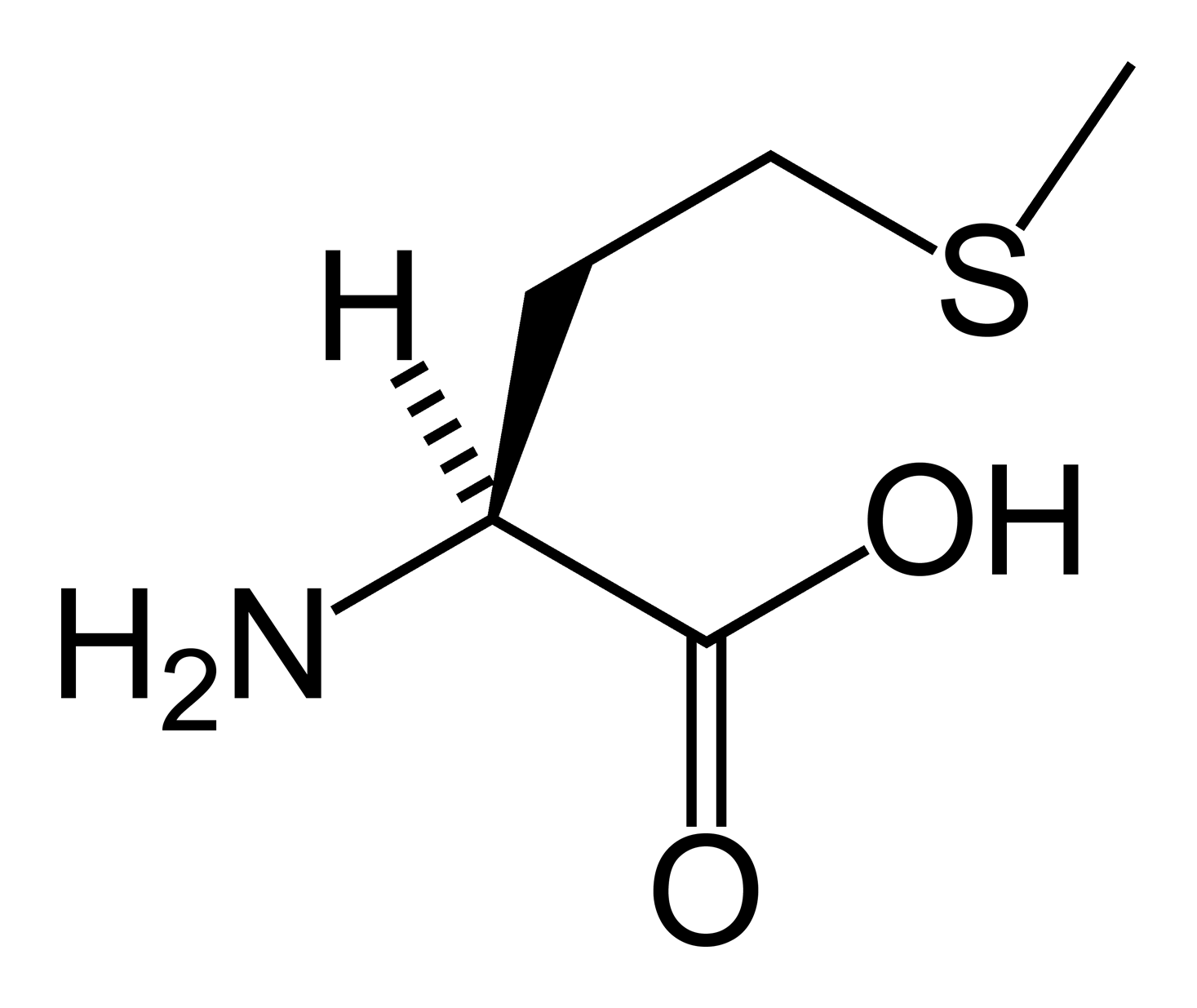
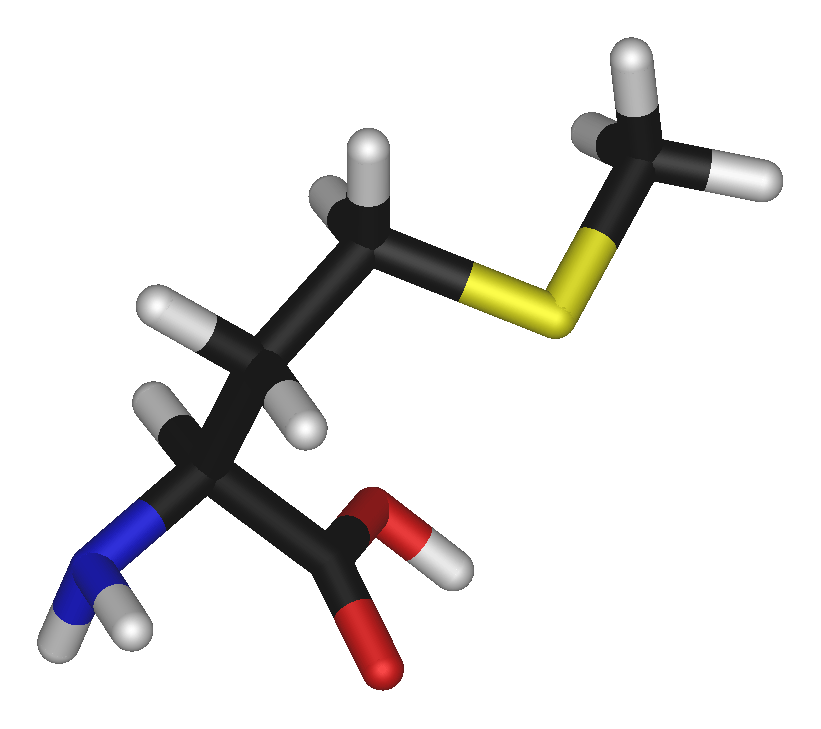
General information
Chemical formula: C_{5}H_{11}NO_{2}S
Molar mass: 149.21 g·mol^{−1}
Systematic name:
(S)2-amino-4-methylsulfanyl-butanoic acid
Abbreviations: M, Met
Synonyms:
?
Database data
SMILES: CSCCC(C(=O)O)N
InChI=InChI=1/C5H11NO2S/c1-9-3-2-4(6)5(7)8/h4H,2-3,6H2,1H3,(H,7,8)/f/h7H (L)
1/C5H11NO2S/c1-9-3-2-4(6)5(7)8/h4H,2-3,6H2,1H3,(H,7,8)/t4-/m0/s1/f/h7H (D)

ATC: N/A	CAS: 63-68-3	DrugBank: N/A	EINECS: 200-562-9^{a}	PubChem: 876 (D) ^{a}, 6137 (L)^{a}

Physical properties

Structure	Crystal data	Spectral data: UV-Vis / IR / NMR / MS

Phase behavior	Solid properties ρ_{solid}: 1.340 g.cm^{−3} T_{m}: 281 °C	Liquid properties	Gas properties

Hazard properties

MSDS N/A	Main hazards: N/A	NFPA 704	Flash point: N/A	RTECS number: N/A

Chemical properties

XLogP: -2.308	pI: 5.74	pK_{a}: 2.16, 9.08	Tautomers:	Hydrogen bond: donor - 2; acceptor - 3

Pharmacological properties

This box:
- Except where noted otherwise, data relate to Standard temperature and pressure.
- Reliability of data general note.
