= Methionine =

Sulfur-containing amino acid

- Chemical structure of methionine Skeletal formula of the canonical form of methionine

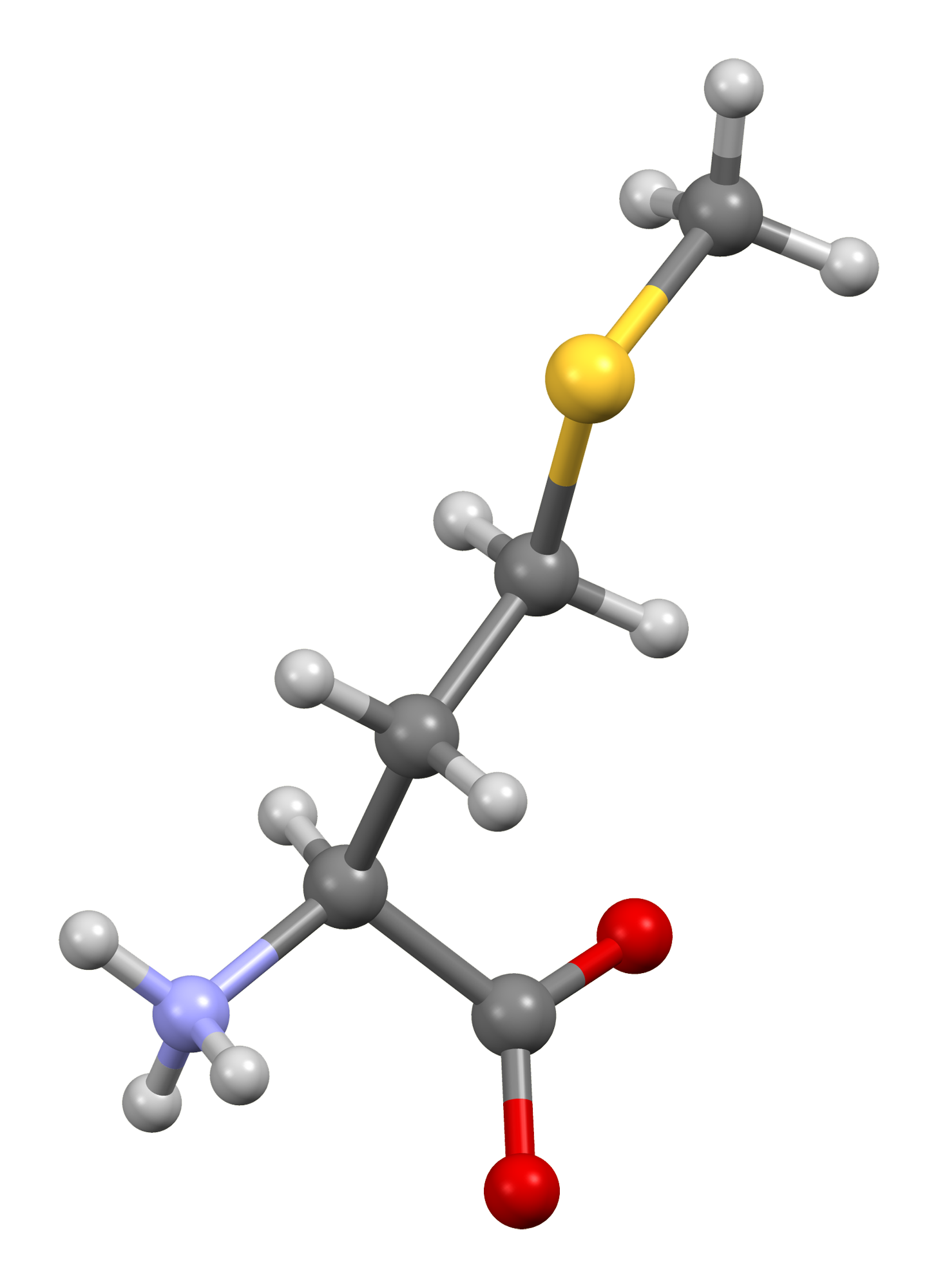
Ball-and-stick model
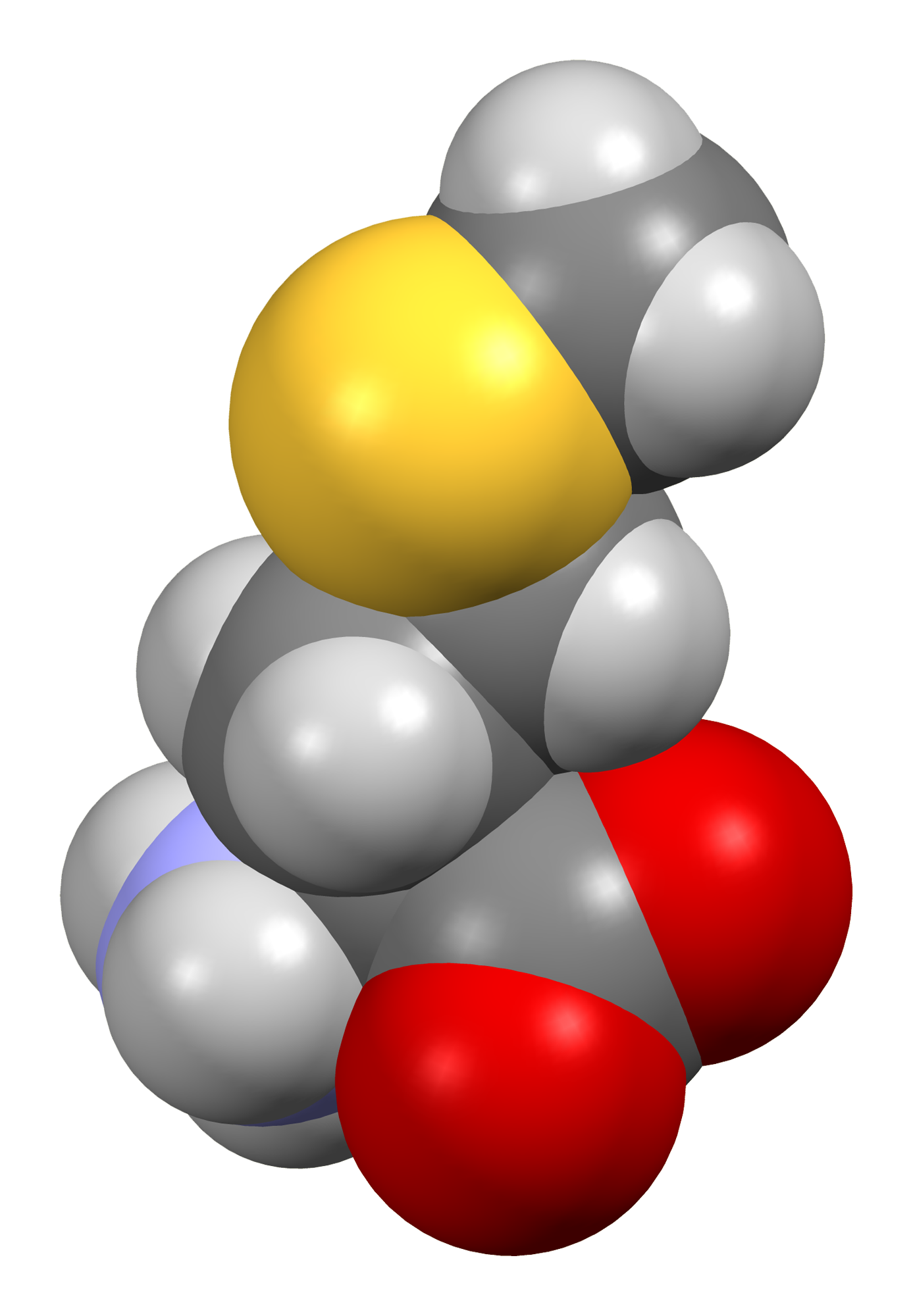
Space-filling model

Names
- IUPAC name Methionine
- Systematic IUPAC name 2-Amino-4-(methylsulfanyl)butanoic acid
- Other names 2-amino-4-(methylthio)butanoic acid Amino-γ-methylthiobutyric acid

Identifiers
CAS Number	L: 63-68-3; D/L: 59-51-8; D: 348-67-4
3D model (JSmol)	L: Interactive image; L Zwitterion: Interactive image
Abbreviations	Met, M
ChEBI	L: CHEBI:16643; D/L: CHEBI:16811; D: CHEBI:16867
ChEMBL	L: ChEMBL42336
ChemSpider	L: 5907; D/L: 853; D: 76512
DrugBank	L: DB00134
ECHA InfoCard	100.000.393
EC Number	L: 200-432-1
KEGG	L: C00073
PubChem CID	L: 6137; D/L: 876; D: 84815
UNII	L: AE28F7PNPL; D/L: 73JWT2K6T3; D: 868496F25R
CompTox Dashboard (EPA)	L: DTXSID9020821
- InChI: InChI=1S/C5H11NO2S/c1-9-3-2-4(6)5(7)8/h4H,2-3,6H2,1H3,(H,7,8)/t4-/m0/s1 Key: FFEARJCKVFRZRR-BYPYZUCNSA-N; D/L: Key: FFEARJCKVFRZRR-UHFFFAOYSA-N; D: Key: FFEARJCKVFRZRR-SCSAIBSYSA-N
- SMILES: L: CSCC[C@H](N)C(=O)O; L Zwitterion: CSCC[C@H]([NH3+])C(=O)[O-]

Properties
Chemical formula	C_{5}H_{11}NO_{2}S
Molar mass	149.21 g·mol^{−1}
Appearance	White crystalline powder
Density	1.340 g/cm^{3}
Melting point	281 °C (538 °F; 554 K) decomposes
Solubility in water	Soluble
Acidity (pK_{a})	2.28 (carboxyl), 9.21 (amino)

Pharmacology
ATC code	V03AB26 (WHO) QA05BA90 (WHO), QG04BA90 (WHO)

Supplementary data page
- Methionine (data page)
- Except where otherwise noted, data are given for materials in their standard state (at 25 °C [77 °F], 100 kPa). Infobox references

Methionine ball and stick model spinning

Methionine (symbol Met or M) (/mɪˈθaɪəniːn/) is an essential amino acid in humans. Compared to other amino acids, methionine has particularly decisive biosynthetic roles. It is the precursor to the amino acid cysteine and the pervasive methylation agent rSAM. Methionine is required for protein synthesis, which is initiated by N-formylmethionine-sRNA.

Methionine was first isolated in 1921 by John Howard Mueller. It is encoded by the codon AUG. It was named by Satoru Odake in 1925, as an abbreviation of its structural description 2-amino-4-(methylthio)butanoic acid.

== Biochemical details ==
Methionine (abbreviated as Met or M; encoded by the codon AUG) is an α-amino acid that is used in the biosynthesis of proteins. It contains a carboxyl group (which is in the deprotonated −COO^{−} form under biological pH conditions), an amino group (which is in the protonated −NH^{+}_{3} form under biological pH conditions) located in α-position with respect to the carboxyl group, and an S-methyl thioether side chain, classifying it as a nonpolar, aliphatic amino acid.

In nuclear genes of eukaryotes and in Archaea, methionine is coded for by the start codon, meaning it indicates the start of the coding region and is the first amino acid produced in a nascent polypeptide during mRNA translation.

== A proteinogenic amino acid ==
Cysteine and methionine are the two sulfur-containing proteinogenic amino acids. Excluding the few exceptions where methionine may act as a redox sensor (e.g., methionine sulfoxide), methionine residues do not have a catalytic role. This is in contrast to cysteine residues, where the thiol group has a catalytic role in many proteins. The thioether within methionine does however have a minor structural role due to the stability effect of S/π interactions between the side chain sulfur atom and aromatic amino acids in one-third of all known protein structures. This lack of a strong role is reflected in experiments where little effect is seen in proteins where methionine is replaced by norleucine, a straight hydrocarbon sidechain amino acid which lacks the thioether. It has been conjectured that norleucine was present in early versions of the genetic code, but methionine intruded into the final version of the genetic code due to its role in the cofactor S-adenosylmethionine (rSAM). This situation is not unique and may have occurred with ornithine and arginine.

=== Encoding ===
Methionine is one of only two amino acids encoded by a single codon (AUG) in the standard genetic code (tryptophan, encoded by UGG, is the other). In reflection to the evolutionary origin of its codon, the other AUN codons encode isoleucine, which is also a hydrophobic amino acid. In the mitochondrial genome of several organisms, including metazoa and yeast, the codon AUA also encodes for methionine. In the standard genetic code AUA codes for isoleucine and the respective tRNA (ileX in Escherichia coli) uses the unusual base lysidine (bacteria) or agmatidine (archaea) to discriminate against AUG.

The methionine codon AUG is also the most common start codon. A "Start" codon is message for a ribosome that signals the initiation of protein translation from mRNA when the AUG codon is in a Kozak consensus sequence. As a consequence, methionine is often incorporated into the N-terminal position of proteins in eukaryotes and archaea during translation, although it can be removed by post-translational modification. In bacteria, the derivative N-formylmethionine is used as the initial amino acid.

== Derivatives ==
=== S-Adenosylmethionine ===
S-Adenosylmethionine is a cofactor derived from methionine.

The methionine-derivative S-adenosylmethionine (rSAM) is a cofactor that serves mainly as a methyl donor. rSAM is composed of an adenosyl molecule (via 5′ carbon) attached to the sulfur of methionine. It is a sulfonium cation that releases a methyl radical upon reduction.

== Biosynthesis ==
Methionine biosynthesis

As an essential amino acid, methionine is not synthesized de novo in humans and other animals, which must ingest methionine or methionine-containing proteins. In plants and microorganisms, methionine biosynthesis belongs to the aspartate family, along with threonine and lysine (via diaminopimelate, but not via α-aminoadipate). The main backbone is derived from aspartic acid, while the sulfur may come from cysteine, methanethiol, or hydrogen sulfide.

- First, aspartic acid is converted via β-aspartyl semialdehyde into homoserine by two reduction steps of the terminal carboxyl group (homoserine has therefore a γ-hydroxyl, hence the homo- series). The intermediate aspartate semialdehyde is the branching point with the lysine biosynthetic pathway, where it is instead condensed with pyruvate. Homoserine is the branching point with the threonine pathway, where instead it is isomerised after activating the terminal hydroxyl with phosphate (also used for methionine biosynthesis in plants).
- Homoserine is then activated with a phosphate, succinyl or an acetyl group on the hydroxyl.
  - In plants and possibly in some bacteria, phosphate is used. This step is shared with threonine biosynthesis.
  - In most organisms, an acetyl group is used to activate the homoserine. This can be catalysed in bacteria by an enzyme encoded by metX or metA (not homologues).
  - In enterobacteria and a limited number of other organisms, succinate is used. The enzyme that catalyses the reaction is MetA and the specificity for acetyl-CoA and succinyl-CoA is dictated by a single residue. The physiological basis for the preference of acetyl-CoA or succinyl-CoA is unknown, but such alternative routes are present in some other pathways (e.g. lysine biosynthesis and arginine biosynthesis).
- The hydroxyl activating group is then replaced with cysteine, methanethiol, or hydrogen sulfide. A replacement reaction is technically a γ-elimination followed by a variant of a Michael addition. All the enzymes involved are homologues and members of the Cys/Met metabolism PLP-dependent enzyme family, which is a subset of the PLP-dependent fold type I clade. They utilise the cofactor PLP (pyridoxal phosphate), which functions by stabilising carbanion intermediates.
  - If it reacts with cysteine, it produces cystathionine, which is cleaved to yield homocysteine. The enzymes involved are cystathionine-γ-synthase (encoded by metB in bacteria) and cystathionine-β-lyase (metC). Cystathionine is bound differently in the two enzymes allowing β or γ reactions to occur.
  - If it reacts with free hydrogen sulfide, it produces homocysteine. This is catalysed by O-acetylhomoserine aminocarboxypropyltransferase (formerly known as O-acetylhomoserine (thiol)-lyase. It is encoded by either metY or metZ in bacteria.
  - If it reacts with methanethiol, it produces methionine directly. Methanethiol is a byproduct of catabolic pathway of certain compounds, therefore this route is more uncommon.
- If homocysteine is produced, the thiol group is methylated, yielding methionine. Two methionine synthases are known; one is cobalamin (vitamin B_{12}) dependent and one is independent.

The pathway using cysteine is called the "transsulfuration pathway", while the pathway using hydrogen sulfide (or methanethiol) is called "direct-sulfurylation pathway".

Cysteine is similarly produced, namely it can be made from an activated glycine and either from homocysteine ("reverse transsulfurylation route") or from hydrogen sulfide ("direct sulfurylation route"); the activated serine is generally O-acetylserine (via CysK or CysM in E. coli), but in Aeropyrum pernix and some other archaea O-phosphoserine is used. CysK and CysM are homologues, but belong to the PLP fold type III clade.

=== Transsulfurylation pathway ===
Enzymes involved in the E. coli transsulfurylation route of methionine biosynthesis:

1. Aspartokinase
2. Aspartate-semialdehyde dehydrogenase
3. Homoserine dehydrogenase
4. Homoserine O-transsuccinylase
5. Cystathionine-γ-synthase
6. Cystathionine-β-lyase
7. Methionine synthase (in mammals, this step is performed by homocysteine methyltransferase or betaine—homocysteine S-methyltransferase.)

== Other biochemical pathways ==
Fates of methionine

Although mammals cannot synthesize methionine, they can still use it in a variety of biochemical pathways:

=== Catabolism ===
Methionine is converted to S-adenosylmethionine (rSAM) by (1) methionine adenosyltransferase.

rSAM serves as a methyl donor in many (2) methyltransferase reactions, and is converted to S-adenosylhomocysteine (SAH).

(3) Adenosylhomocysteinase cysteine.

=== Regeneration ===
Methionine can be regenerated from homocysteine via (4) methionine synthase in a reaction that requires vitamin B_{12} as a cofactor.

Homocysteine can also be remethylated using glycine betaine (N,N,N-trimethylglycine, TMG) to methionine via the enzyme betaine-homocysteine methyltransferase (E.C.2.1.1.5, BHMT). BHMT makes up to 1.5% of all the soluble protein of the liver, and recent evidence suggests that it may have a greater influence on methionine and homocysteine homeostasis than methionine synthase.

=== Reverse-transulfurylation pathway: conversion to cysteine ===
Homocysteine can be converted to cysteine.

- (5) Cystathionine-β-synthase (an enzyme which requires pyridoxal phosphate, the active form of vitamin B6) combines homocysteine and serine to produce cystathionine. Instead of degrading cystathionine via cystathionine-β-lyase, as in the biosynthetic pathway, cystathionine is broken down to cysteine and α-ketobutyrate via (6) cystathionine-γ-lyase.
- (7) The enzyme α-ketoacid dehydrogenase converts α-ketobutyrate to propionyl-CoA, which is metabolized to succinyl-CoA in a three-step process (see propionyl-CoA for pathway).

== Metabolic diseases ==
The degradation of methionine is impaired in the following metabolic diseases:

- Combined malonic and methylmalonic aciduria (CMAMMA)
- Homocystinuria
- Methylmalonic acidemia
- Propionic acidemia

== Chemical synthesis ==
The industrial synthesis combines acrolein, methanethiol, and cyanide, which affords the hydantoin. Racemic methionine can also be synthesized from diethyl sodium phthalimidomalonate by alkylation with chloroethylmethylsulfide (ClCH_{2}CH_{2}SCH_{3}) followed by hydrolysis and decarboxylation. Also see Methanol.

== Human nutrition ==
There is inconclusive clinical evidence on methionine supplementation. Dietary restriction of methionine can lead to bone-related disorders.

Overconsumption of methionine, the methyl group donor in DNA methylation, is related to cancer growth in a number of studies.

=== Requirements ===
The Food and Nutrition Board of the U.S. Institute of Medicine set Recommended Dietary Allowances (RDAs) for essential amino acids in 2002. For methionine combined with cysteine, for adults 19 years and older, 19 mg/kg body weight/day.

This translates to about 1.33 grams per day for a 70 kilogram individual.

=== Dietary sources ===
Food sources of methionine
Food	g/100 g
Egg, white, dried, powder, glucose reduced	3.204
Sesame seeds flour (low fat)	1.656
Brazil nuts	1.124
Cheese, Parmesan, shredded	1.114
Hemp seed, hulled	0.933
Soy protein concentrate	0.814
Chicken, broilers or fryers, roasted	0.801
Fish, tuna, light, canned in water, drained solids	0.755
Beef, cured, dried	0.749
Bacon	0.593
Chia seeds	0.588
Beef, ground, 95% lean meat / 5% fat, raw	0.565
Pork, ground, 96% lean / 4% fat, raw	0.564
Soybeans	0.547
Wheat germ	0.456
Egg, whole, cooked, hard-boiled	0.392
Oat	0.312
Peanuts	0.309
Chickpea	0.253
Corn, yellow	0.197
Almonds	0.151
Beans, pinto, cooked	0.117
Lentils, cooked	0.077
Rice, brown, medium-grain, cooked	0.052

High levels of methionine can be found in eggs, meat, and fish; sesame seeds, Brazil nuts, and some other plant seeds; and cereal grains. Most fruits and vegetables contain very little. Most legumes, though protein dense, are low in methionine. Proteins without adequate methionine are not considered to be complete proteins. For that reason, racemic methionine is sometimes added as an ingredient to pet foods.

== Health ==
Loss of methionine has been linked to senile greying of hair. Its lack leads to a buildup of hydrogen peroxide in hair follicles, a reduction in tyrosinase effectiveness, and a gradual loss of hair color. Methionine raises the intracellular concentration of glutathione, thereby promoting antioxidant-mediated cell defense and redox regulation. It also protects cells against dopamine induced nigral cell loss by binding oxidative metabolites.

Methionine is an intermediate in the biosynthesis of cysteine, carnitine, taurine, lecithin, phosphatidylcholine, and other phospholipids. Improper conversion of methionine can lead to atherosclerosis due to accumulation of homocysteine.

== Other uses ==
DL-Methionine is sometimes given as a supplement to dogs; It helps reduce the chances of kidney stones in dogs. Methionine is also known to increase the urinary excretion of quinidine by acidifying the urine. Aminoglycoside antibiotics used to treat urinary tract infections work best in alkaline conditions, and urinary acidification from using methionine can reduce its effectiveness. If a dog is on a diet that acidifies the urine, methionine should not be used.

Methionine is allowed as a supplement to organic poultry feed under the US certified organic program.

Methionine can be used as a nontoxic pesticide option against giant swallowtail caterpillars, which are a serious pest to orange crops.

== Restricting methionine intake ==
More and more studies show that restricting methionine intake can increase the lifespan of some animals.

In 2005, a study showed that restricting methionine intake without energy restriction in rodents increases their lifespan.

== See also ==
- Allantoin
- Formylmethionine
- Methionine oxidation
- Paracetamol poisoning
- Photoreactive methionine
- S-Methylcysteine
