= Var1 protein domain =

VAR1

Identifiers
- Symbol: VAR1
- Pfam: PF05316
- InterPro: IPR007980
Available protein structures:
- PDB: IPR007980 PF05316 (ECOD; PDBsum)
- AlphaFold: IPR007980; PF05316

In molecular biology, VAR1 protein domain, otherwise known as variant protein 1, is a ribosomal protein that forms part of the small ribosomal subunit in yeast mitochondria. Mitochondria possess their own ribosomes responsible for the synthesis of a small number of proteins encoded by the mitochondrial genome. VAR1 is the only protein in the yeast mitochondrial ribosome to be encoded in the mitochondria - the remaining approximately 80 ribosomal proteins are encoded in the nucleus. VAR1 along with 15S rRNA are necessary for the formation of mature 37S subunits.

== Function ==
It is thought that Var1 plays a role in the early steps of small subunit assembly and is required for the incorporation of at least one ribosomal protein. It is important for mitochondrial translational initiation, since it requires the interaction between the small ribosomal subunit and the message-specific translation factors.

== Ribosomal proteins in translation ==
Ribosomes are the organelles that catalyse mRNA-directed protein synthesis in all organisms. The codons of the mRNA are exposed on the ribosome to allow tRNA binding. This leads to the incorporation of amino acids into the growing polypeptide chain in accordance with the genetic information. Incoming amino acid monomers enter the ribosomal A site in the form of aminoacyl-tRNAs complexed with elongation factor Tu (EF-Tu) and GTP. The growing polypeptide chain, situated in the P site as peptidyl-tRNA, is then transferred to aminoacyl-tRNA and the new peptidyl-tRNA, extended by one residue, is translocated to the P site with the aid the elongation factor G (EF-G) and GTP as the deacylated tRNA is released from the ribosome through one or more exit sites. Since Var1 helps form the small subunit of the ribosome, its significance become apparent in translation and cell survival.
