= Cys/Met metabolism PLP-dependent enzyme family =

Cys_Met_Meta_PP
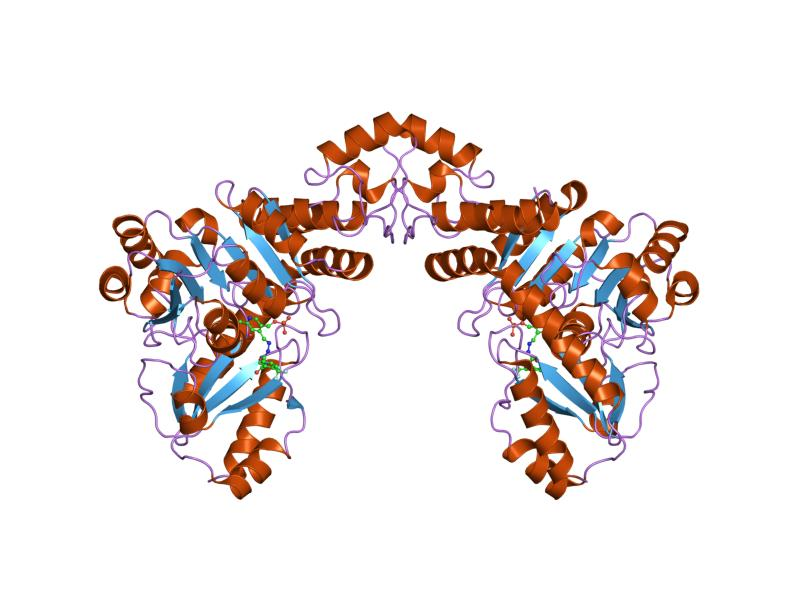
- cystathionine beta-lyase (cbl) from escherichia coli in complex with n-hydrazinocarbonylmethyl-2-trifluoromethyl-benzamide

Identifiers
- Symbol: Cys_Met_Meta_PP
- Pfam: PF01053
- Pfam clan: CL0061
- InterPro: IPR000277
- PROSITE: PDOC00677
- SCOP2: 1cs1 / SCOPe / SUPFAM
- CDD: cd00614
Available protein structures:
- PDB: IPR000277 PF01053 (ECOD; PDBsum)
- AlphaFold: IPR000277; PF01053

In molecular biology, the Cys/Met metabolism PLP-dependent enzyme family is a family of proteins including enzymes involved in cysteine and methionine metabolism which use PLP (pyridoxal-5'-phosphate) as a cofactor.

== Mechanism of action ==
PLP is employed as it binds to amino groups and stabilises carbanion intermediates. PLP enzymes exist in their resting state as a Schiff base, the aldehyde group of PLP forming a linkage with the epsilon-amino group of an active site lysine residue on the enzyme. The alpha-amino group of the substrate displaces the lysine epsilon-amino group, in the process forming a new aldimine with the substrate. This aldimine is the common central intermediate for all PLP-catalysed reactions, enzymatic and non-enzymatic.

== Function ==
PLP is the active form of vitamin B6 (pyridoxine or pyridoxal). PLP is a versatile catalyst, acting as a coenzyme in a multitude of reactions, including decarboxylation, deamination and transamination.

A number of pyridoxal-dependent enzymes involved in the metabolism of cysteine, homocysteine and methionine have been shown to be evolutionary related. These enzymes are tetrameric proteins of about 400 amino-acid residues. Each monomer has an active site, which however requires the N-terminal of another monomer to be completed (salt bridges to phosphate and entrance way). The phosphopyridoxyl group is attached to a lysine residue located in the central section of these enzymes and is stabilised by π-stacking interactions with a tyrosine residue above it.

== Family members ==
There are five different structurally related types of PLP enzymes. Members of this family belong to the type I and are:

- in the transsulfurylation route for methionine biosynthesis:
  - Cystathionine γ-synthase (metB) which joins an activated homoserine ester (acetyl or succinyl) with cysteine to form cystathionine
  - Cystathionine β-lyase (metC) which splits cystathionine into homocysteine and a deaminated alanine (pyruvate and ammonia)
- in the direct sulfurylation pathway for methionine biosynthesis:
  - O-acetyl homoserine sulfhydrylase (metY) which adds a thiol group to an activated homoserine ester
  - O-succinylhomoserine sulfhydrylase (metZ) which adds a thiol group to an activated homoserine ester
- in the reverse transsulfurylation pathway for cysteine biosynthesis:
  - Cystathionine γ-lyase (no common gene name) which joins an activated serine ester (acetyl or succinyl) with homocysteine to form cystathionine
  - Not Cystathionine β-synthase which is a PLP enzyme type II
- cysteine biosynthesis from serine:
  - O-acetyl serine sulfhydrylase (cysK or cysM) which adds a thiol group to an activated serine ester
- methionine degradation:
- Methionine gamma-lyase (mdeA) which breaks down methionine at the thioether and amine bounds

Note: MetC, metB, metZ are closely related and have fuzzy boundaries so fall under the same NCBI orthologue cluster (COG0626).
