= Lachancea thermotolerans =

Scientific classification
- Kingdom: Fungi
- Division: Ascomycota
- Class: Saccharomycetes
- Order: Saccharomycetales
- Family: Saccharomycetaceae
- Genus: Lachancea
- Species: L. thermotolerans

Binomial name
- Lachancea thermotolerans (Filippov) Kurtzman 2003

Species of yeast fungus

Lachancea thermotolerans is a species of yeast.

== Taxonomy ==
Lachancea thermotolerans is the type species of the genus Lachancea. The species has previously been known as Kluyveromyces thermotolerans and Zygosaccharomyces thermotolerans, which is the name by which it was first described in 1932.

== Habitat and ecology ==
Lachancea thermotolerans is widely distributed and occurs in diverse environments, both natural and man-made. It has been isolated from locations around the world. The species is commonly associated with fruit and with insects such as fruit flies that feed on fruit. In some cases, it has been identified as one of several species found in naturally fermented foods.

== Uses ==
Lachancea thermotolerans is unusual among yeasts in its ability to produce lactic acid through fermentation. This property has prompted study of L. thermotolerans in the production of wine and beer, both of which are traditionally produced using Saccharomyces yeasts. In winemaking, L. thermotolerans and other yeast species have been studied for the effects of their metabolites on the flavor profile of wines. Systems including L. thermotolerans in co-fermentation with wine yeast or in place of lactic acid bacteria have been described as an alternative to traditional malolactic fermentation. L. thermotolerans has been sold commercially on its own and in a yeast blend. In beer brewing, L. thermotolerans has been considered as a method for producing sour beer. It has been observed that this kind of yeast ferments at low temperatures (17 °C) as well as at high temperatures (27 °C) and with SO2 doses of 25 mg/L and 75 mg/L with an ethanol yield between 7-11% vol. Sequential inoculations (binary) and sequential co-inoculations (ternary) with different non-Saccharomyces, including L. thermotolerans, have also been studied, resulting in very significant synergies and inhibitions in lactic acid production. It should be added that craft beer, an alcoholic beverage made from water, malt, hops and yeast, has seen a boom in interest in its brewing with different strains (Saccharomyces cerevisiae, Lachancea thermotolerans, Hanseniaspora vineae and Schizosaccharomyces pombe) that sensorially modify the product. Thus, primary fermentation with L. thermotolerans significantly lowers the pH (3.41) due to its production of l-lactic acid, and conditioning with H. vineae enhanced aromatic esters such as 2-phenylethyl acetate, a sign of high olfactory quality.

Today there are several non-thermal technologies for partial or total elimination of microorganisms with are-PEF and UHPH-improve the quality of the must and the sensory profile of the wine without damaging its organoleptic qualities. PEF facilitates the implantation of inoculated yeasts (Lachancea thermotolerans, Hanseniaspora vineae, Torulaspora delbrueckii), increasing the production of lactic acid and aromatic esters (2-phenylethyl acetate) and the extraction of anthocyanins. UHPH sterilizes the must (300 MPa/77 °C<0.2 s), eliminates microbial load and oxidative enzymes, increases antioxidant activity and protects acylated anthocyanins, in addition to reducing higher alcohols and increasing 2-phenylethyl acetate. It has also been observed that using the latter non-thermal technology, co-inoculation of non-Saccharomyces yeasts (Lachancea thermotolerans and Metschnikowia pulcherrima) in Tempranillo must optimizes fermentation-in trial A by varying initial proportions and in trial B by adding quercetin + thiamine-enhancing the prevalence of L. thermotolerans, the synergy that generates >5 g/L lactic acid and an almost twofold increase in ethyl lactate. In addition, wines from UHPH musts had an 8-10 % higher total polyphenol index, suggesting greater protection against oxidation.
