= Lysidine (nucleoside) =

Names
- IUPAC name 2-Amino-6-[4-amino-1-(3,4-dihydroxy-5-hydroxymethyloxolan-2-yl)-1H-pyrimidin-2-ylideneamino]hexanoic acid
- Other names 4-Amino-2-(N(6)-lysino)-1-ribofuranosylpyrimidine, 2-lysyl-cytidine

Identifiers
CAS Number	144796-96-3
3D model (JSmol)	Interactive image
ChemSpider	24604124
PubChem CID	44124149
CompTox Dashboard (EPA)	DTXSID20657499
- InChI: InChI=1S/C15H25N5O6/c16-8(14(24)25)3-1-2-5-18-15-19-10(17)4-6-20(15)13-12(23)11(22)9(7-21)26-13/h4,6,8-9,11-13,21-23H,1-3,5,7,16H2,(H,24,25)(H2,17,18,19)/t8-,9+,11+,12+,13+/m0/s1 Key: MDWUIKMWKDMPDE-IINAIABHSA-N
- SMILES: OC[C@H]1O[C@@H](N2C=CC(N)=N/C2=N\CCCC[C@H](N)C(O)=O)[C@H](O)[C@@H]1O

Properties
Chemical formula	C_{15}H_{25}N_{5}O_{6}
Molar mass	371.39 g/mol
- Except where otherwise noted, data are given for materials in their standard state (at 25 °C [77 °F], 100 kPa). verify (what is ?) Infobox references

Lysidine is an uncommon nucleoside, rarely seen outside of tRNA. It is a derivative of cytidine in which the carbonyl is replaced by the amino acid lysine. The first position, i.e. the wobble base, in the anti-codon of the eubacterial isoleucine-specific tRNA pertaining to the AUA codon is typically changed from a cytidine which would pair with guanosine to a lysidine which will base pair with adenosine. Lysidine improves translation fidelity because uridine cannot be used at this position even though it is a conventional partner for adenosine since it will also "wobble base pair" with guanosine. Lysidine is denoted as L or k^{2}C (lysine bound to C2 atom of cytidine).

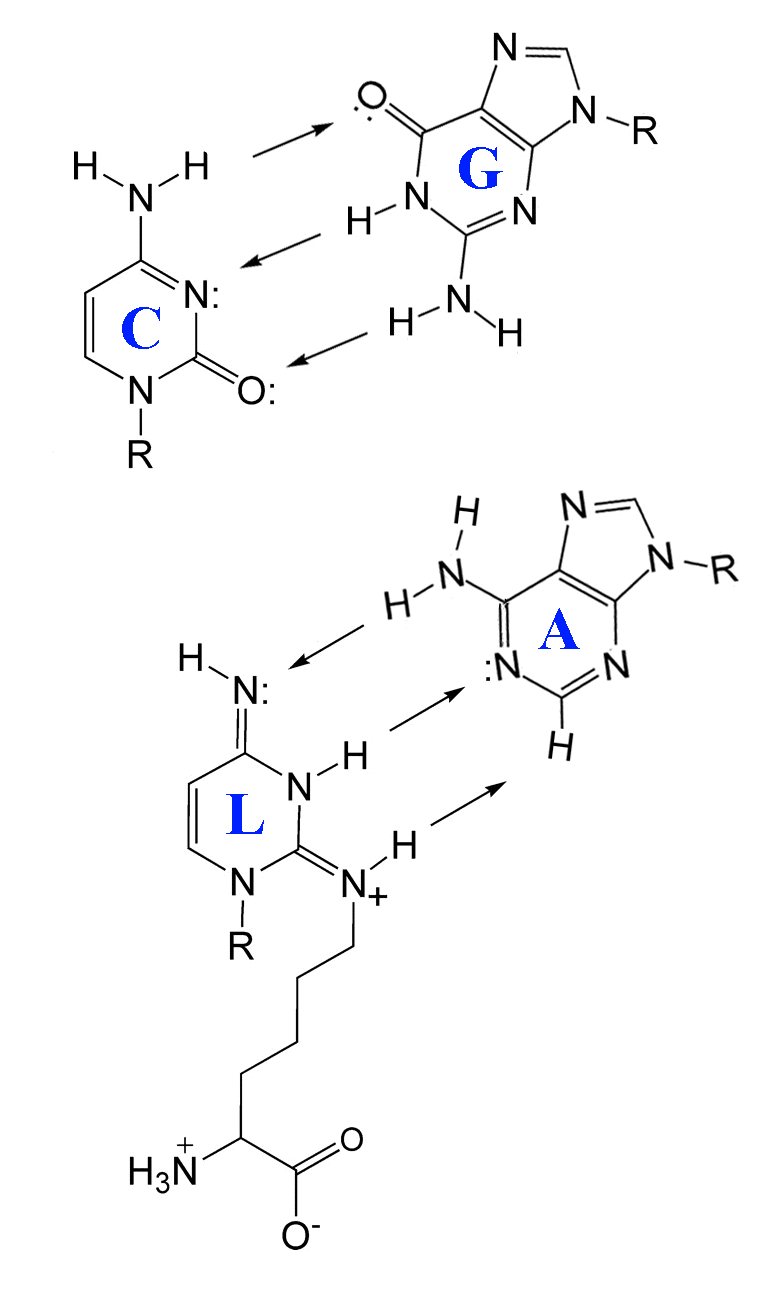
Hydrogen bonding (arrows) in the lysidine (L) and adenosine (A) base pair, compared against the cytidine (C) and guanosine (G) base pair.
