= Homoserine =

l-Homoserine
- Skeletal formula

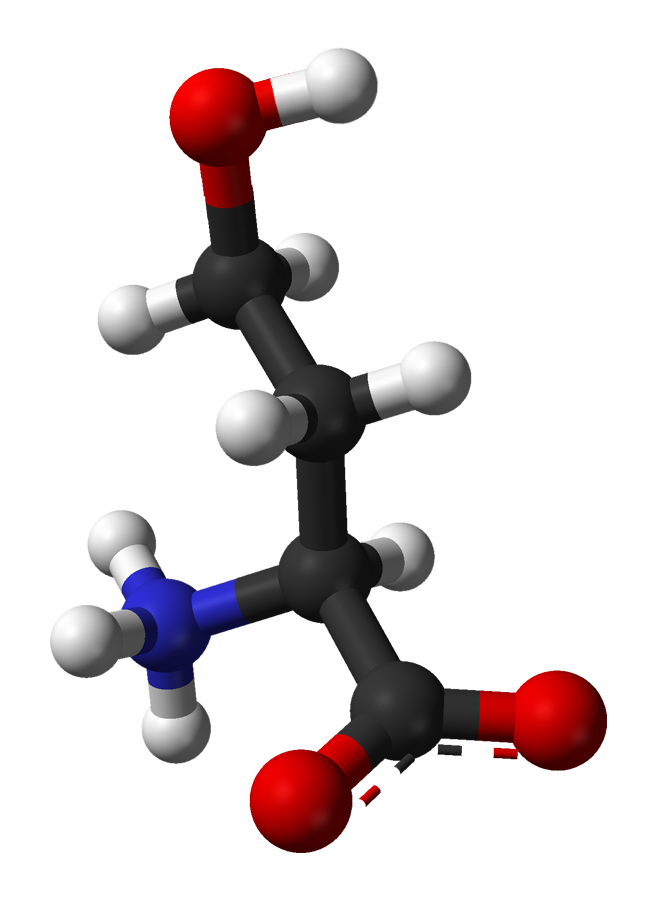
- Ball-and-stick model of the zwitterion

Names
- IUPAC name (S)-2-Amino-4-hydroxybutanoic acid

Identifiers
CAS Number	672-15-1
3D model (JSmol)	Interactive image
ChEBI	CHEBI:30653
ChEMBL	ChEMBL11722
ChemSpider	758
ECHA InfoCard	100.010.538
EC Number	211-590-6
PubChem CID	779
UNII	6KA95X0IVO
CompTox Dashboard (EPA)	DTXSID5075159
- InChI: InChI=1S/C4H9NO3/c5-3(1-2-6)4(7)8/h3,6H,1-2,5H2,(H,7,8) Key: UKAUYVFTDYCKQA-UHFFFAOYSA-N; InChI=1/C4H9NO3/c5-3(1-2-6)4(7)8/h3,6H,1-2,5H2,(H,7,8) Key: UKAUYVFTDYCKQA-UHFFFAOYAZ
- SMILES: O=C(O)C(N)CCO

Properties
Chemical formula	C_{4}H_{9}NO_{3}
Molar mass	119.12 g/mol
Melting point	203 °C (decomposes)
- Except where otherwise noted, data are given for materials in their standard state (at 25 °C [77 °F], 100 kPa). verify (what is ?) Infobox references

Homoserine (also called isothreonine) is an α-amino acid with the chemical formula HO_{2}CCH(NH_{2})CH_{2}CH_{2}OH. L-Homoserine is not one of the common amino acids encoded by DNA. It differs from the proteinogenic amino acid serine by insertion of an additional −CH_{2}− unit into the sidechain. Homoserine, or its lactone, is the product of a cyanogen bromide cleavage of a peptide by degradation of methionine. Homoserine is an intermediate in the biosynthesis of three essential amino acids: methionine, threonine (an isomer of homoserine), and isoleucine.

== Applications ==
Commercially, homoserine can serve as precursor to the synthesis of isobutanol and 1,4-butanediol. Purified homoserine is used in enzyme structural studies. Also, homoserine has played important roles in studies to elucidate peptide synthesis and synthesis of proteoglycan glycopeptides. Bacterial cell lines can make copious amounts of this amino acid.

== Biosynthesis ==
Its complete biosynthetic pathway includes glycolysis, the tricarboxylic acid (TCA) or citric acid cycle (Krebs cycle), and the aspartate metabolic pathway. It forms by two reductions of aspartic acid via the intermediacy of aspartate semialdehyde. Specifically, the enzyme homoserine dehydrogenase, in association with NADPH, catalyzes a reversible reaction that interconverts L-aspartate-4-semialdehyde to L-homoserine. Homoserine kinase and homoserine O-succinyltransferase convert homoserine to phosphohomoserine and O-succinyl homoserine, respectively. Homoserine is produced from aspartate via the intermediate aspartate-4-semialdehyde, which is produced from β-phosphoaspartate. By the action of homoserine dehydrogenases, the semialdehyde is converted to homoserine.

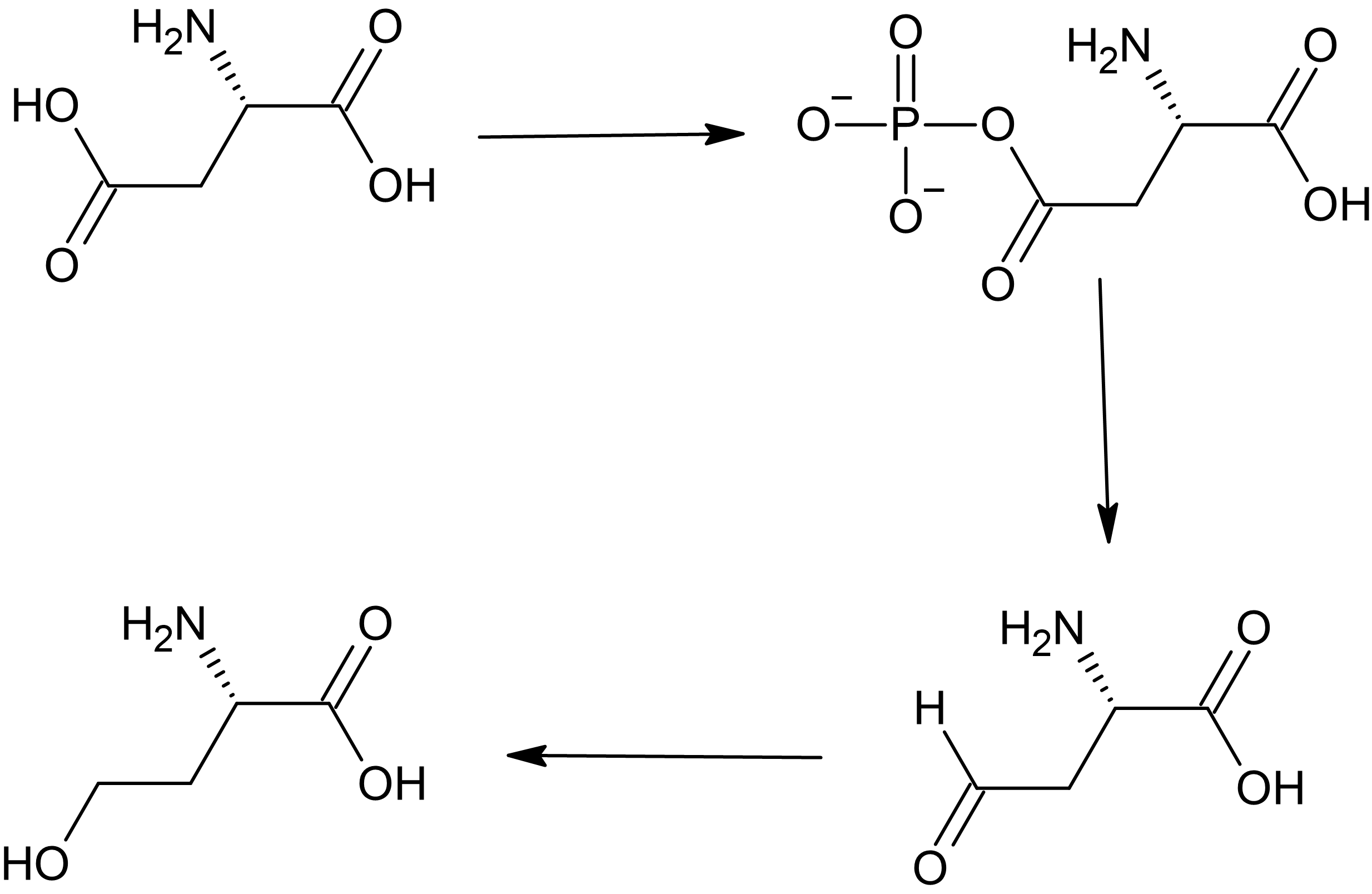
Biosynthesis pathway for homoserine.

== Other biochemical roles ==
L-Homoserine is substrate for homoserine kinase, yielding phosphohomoserine (homoserine-phosphate), which is converted by threonine synthase to L-threonine.

Homoserine is converted to O-succinyl homoserine by homoserine O-succinyltransferase. O-succinyl homoserine is a precursor to L-methionine.

Homoserine inhibits aspartate kinase and glutamate dehydrogenase. Glutamate dehydrogenase reversibly converts glutamate to α-ketoglutarate and α-ketoglutarate coverts to oxaloacetate through the citric cycle. Threonine acts as another allosteric inhibitor of aspartate kinase and homoserine dehydrogenase, but it is a competitive inhibitor of homoserine kinase.
