= Methanethiol =

Chemical compound (CH3SH)

- Methanethiol

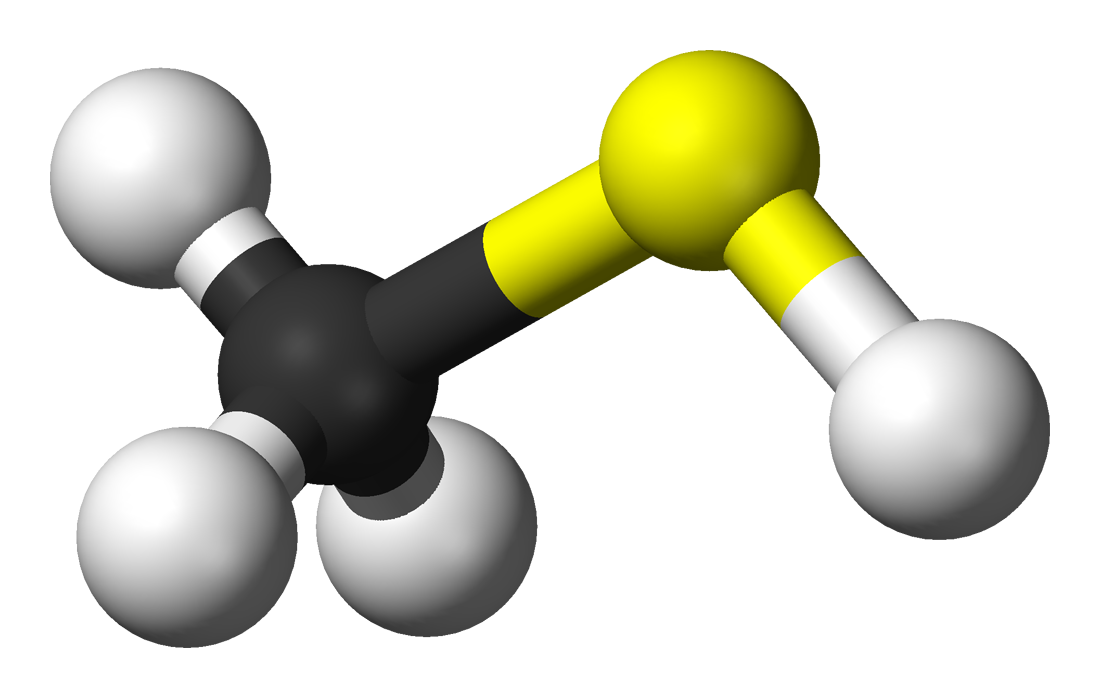
Ball-and-stick model of the methanethiol molecule
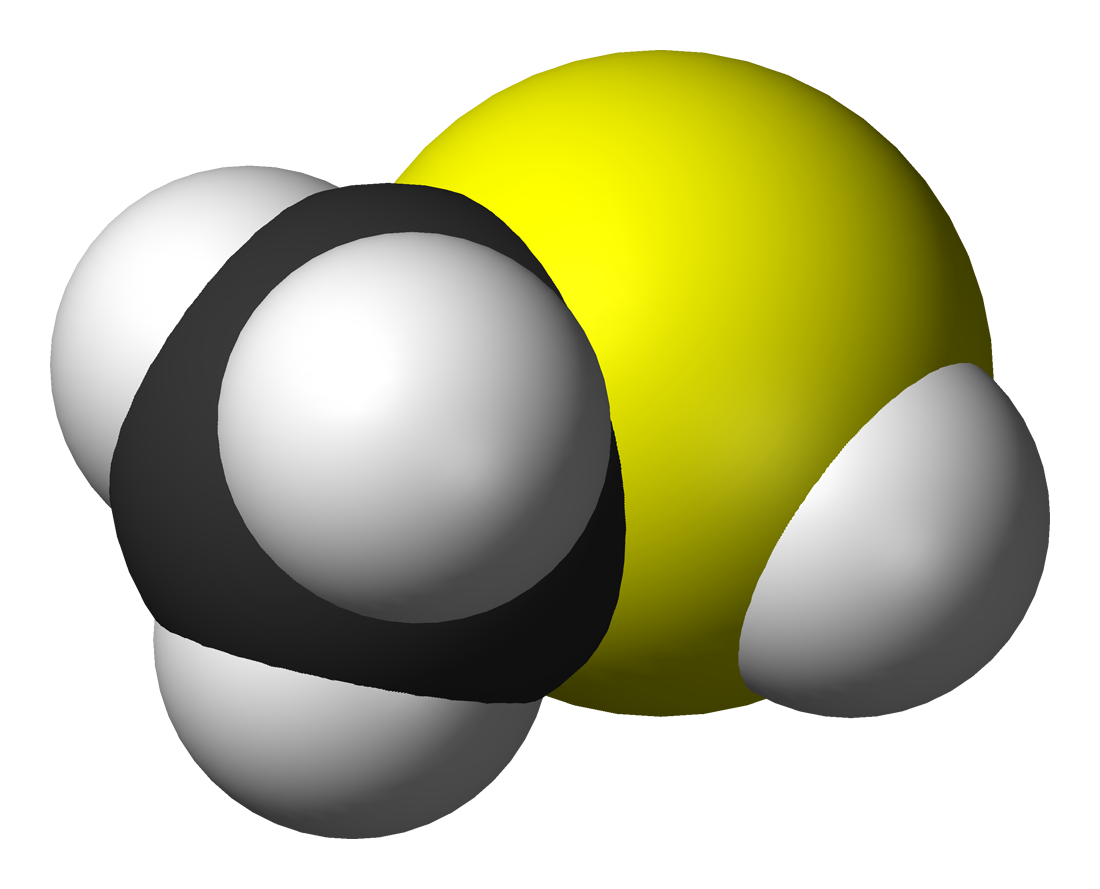
Space-filling model of the methanethiol molecule

Names
- Preferred IUPAC name Methanethiol
- Other names: Methyl mercaptan; Mercaptomethane; Methiol; Thiomethyl alcohol; Thiomethanol; Methylthiol

Identifiers
CAS Number	74-93-1
3D model (JSmol)	Interactive image
Abbreviations	MM; MeSH
ChEBI	CHEBI:16007
ChemSpider	855
ECHA InfoCard	100.000.748
EC Number	200-822-1
KEGG	C00409
PubChem CID	878
RTECS number	PB4375000
UNII	2X8406WW9I
UN number	1064
CompTox Dashboard (EPA)	DTXSID5026382
- InChI: InChI=1S/CH3SH/c1-2/h2H,1H3 Key: LSDPWZHWYPCBBB-UHFFFAOYSA-N; InChI=1/CH3SH/c1-2/h2H,1H3 Key: LSDPWZHWYPCBBB-UHFFFAOYAW
- SMILES: SC

Properties
Chemical formula	CH_{4}S
Molar mass	48.10 g·mol^{−1}
Appearance	colorless gas
Odor	Distinctive, like that of rotten cabbage or eggs
Density	0.9 g/mL (liquid at 0°C)
Melting point	−123 °C (−189 °F; 150 K)
Boiling point	5.95 °C (42.71 °F; 279.10 K)
Solubility in water	2%
Solubility	alcohol, ether
Vapor pressure	1.7 atm (20°C)
Acidity (pK_{a})	~10.4

Hazards
- GHS labelling
Pictograms	(GHS02: Flammable) (GHS06: Toxic) (GHS08: Health hazard) (GHS09: Environmental hazard)
Signal word	Danger
Hazard statements	H220, H331, H410
Precautionary statements	P210, P261, P271, P273, P304+P340, P311, P321, P377, P381, P391, P403, P403+P233, P405, P501
NFPA 704 (fire diamond)	4 4 1
Flash point	−18 °C; 0 °F; 255 K
Autoignition temperature	364 °C; 687 °F; 637 K
Explosive limits	3.9%–21.8%
- Lethal dose or concentration (LD, LC)
LD_{50} (median dose)	60.67 mg/kg (mammal)
LC_{50} (median concentration)	3.3 ppm (mouse, 2 hr); 675 ppm (rat, 4 hr)
- NIOSH (US health exposure limits)
PEL (Permissible)	C 10 ppm (20 mg/m^{3})
REL (Recommended)	C 0.5 ppm (1 mg/m^{3}) [15-minute]
IDLH (Immediate danger)	150 ppm

Related compounds
Related chalcogenols	Methanol; Methaneselenol; Methanetellurol
Related compounds	Hydrogen sulfide; Ethanethiol; Methanedithiol; Dimethyl sulfide; Sodium methanethiolate
- Except where otherwise noted, data are given for materials in their standard state (at 25 °C [77 °F], 100 kPa). verify (what is ?) Infobox references

Methanethiol (/ˌmɛθeɪnˈθaɪ.ɒl/ METH-ayn-THY-ol), also called methyl mercaptan, is an organosulfur compound with the chemical formula CH_{3}SH. It is a colorless flammable gas with a distinctive putrid smell. In small amounts, it is pervasive in nature and found in certain foods, such as some nuts and cheese. It contributes to many odors, including the emissions from pulp mills, bad breath, and flatus. Methanethiol is the simplest thiol and is sometimes abbreviated as MeSH.

== Structure and reactions ==
The molecule is tetrahedral at the carbon atom, like methanol. It is a weak acid, with a pK_{a} of ~10.4, but is about a hundred thousand times more acidic than methanol. The colorless salt can be obtained by treatment with sodium methoxide:

CH_{3}SH + CH_{3}ONa → CH_{3}SNa + CH_{3}OH

The thiolate anion in sodium methanethiolate is a strong nucleophile.

It can be methylated to dimethyl disulfide:

2 CH_{3}SH + [O] → CH_{3}SSCH_{3} + H_{2}O

Further oxidation takes the disulfide to two molecules of methanesulfonic acid, which is odorless. Bleach deodorizes methanethiol in this way.

== Occurrence ==
Methanethiol (MeSH) is released as a by-product of kraft pulping in pulp mills. In kraft pulping, lignin is depolymerized by nucleophilic attack with the strongly nucleophilic hydrosulfide ion (HS^{−}) in a highly alkaline medium. However, in a side reaction, HS^{−} attacks methoxyl groups (OMe) in lignin, demethylating them to give free phenolate groups (PhO^{−}) and releasing MeSH. Due to alkalinity, MeSH is readily deprotonated (MeSNa), and the formed MeS^{−} ion is also a strong nucleophile, reacting further to dimethyl sulfide. The compounds remain in the liquor and are burned in the recovery boiler, where the sulfur is recovered as sodium sulfide.

Methanethiol is released from decaying organic matter in marshes and is present in the natural gas of certain regions, in coal tar, and in some crude oils. It occurs in various plants and vegetables, such as radishes.

In surface seawater, methanethiol is the primary breakdown product of the algal metabolite dimethylsulfoniopropionate (DMSP). Marine bacteria appear to obtain most of the sulfur in their proteins by the breakdown of DMSP and incorporation of methanethiol, despite the fact that methanethiol is present in seawater at much lower concentrations than sulfate (~0.3 nM vs. 28 mM). Bacteria in environments both with and without oxygen can also convert methanethiol to dimethyl sulfide (DMS), although most DMS in surface seawater is produced by a separate pathway. Both DMS and methanethiol can be used by certain microbes as substrates for methanogenesis in some anaerobic soils.

Methanethiol is a byproduct of asparagus metabolism. The production of methanethiol in urine after eating asparagus was once thought to be a genetic trait. More recent research suggests that the peculiar odor is in fact produced by all humans after consuming asparagus, while the ability to detect it (methanethiol being one of many components in "asparagus pee") is in fact the genetic trait. The chemical components responsible for the change in the odor of urine show as soon as 15 minutes after eating asparagus.

== Preparation ==
Methanethiol is prepared commercially by the reaction of methanol with hydrogen sulfide gas over an aluminium oxide catalyst:

CH_{3}OH + H_{2}S → CH_{3}SH + H_{2}O

Although impractical, it can be prepared by the reaction of methyl iodide with thiourea.

== Uses ==
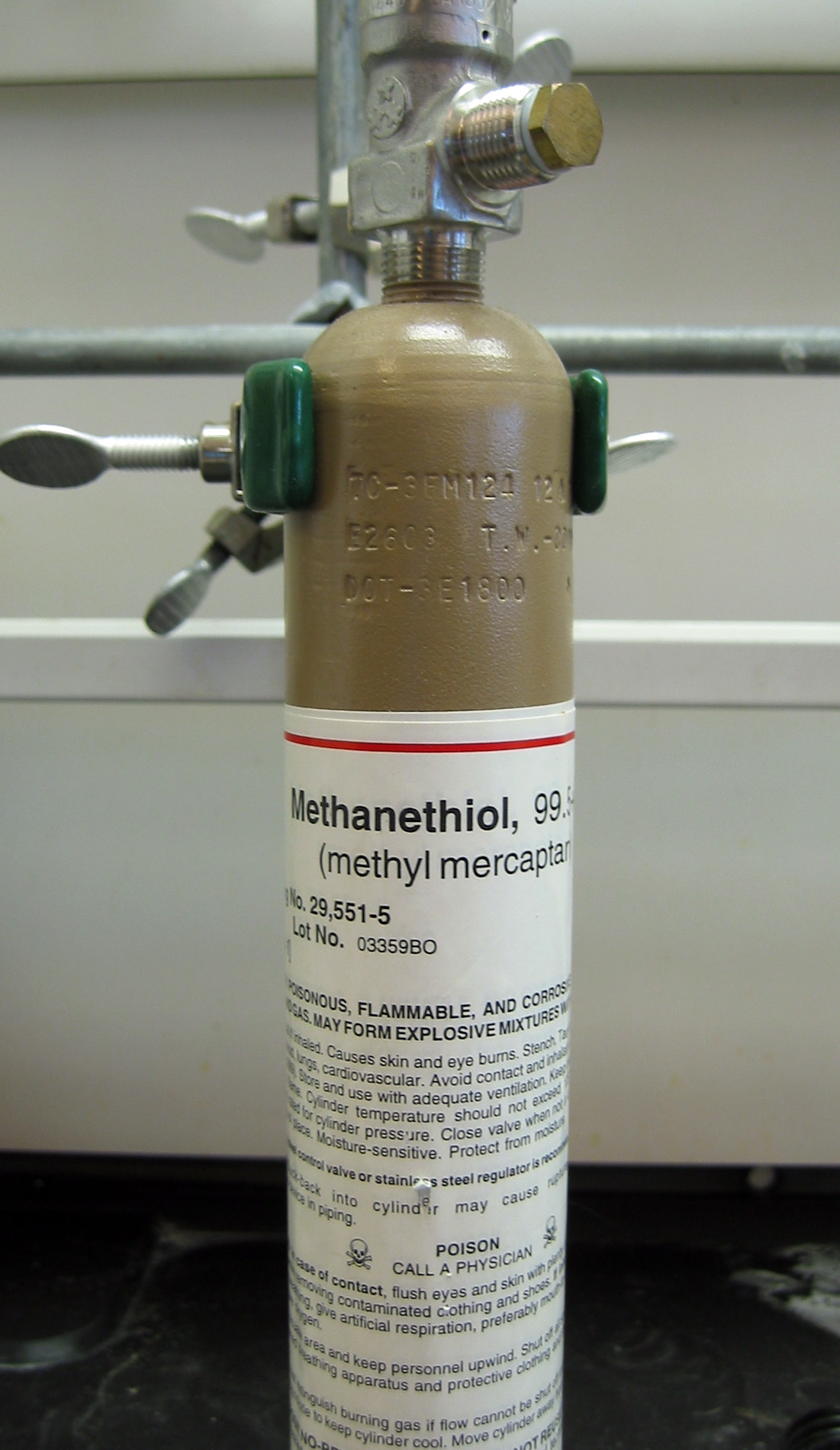
Cylinder of methanethiol gas

Methanethiol is mainly used to produce the essential amino acid methionine, which is used as a dietary component in poultry and animal feed. Methanethiol is also used in the plastic industry as a moderator for free-radical polymerizations and as a precursor in the manufacture of pesticides including isomalathion.

This chemical is also used in the natural gas industry as an odorant, as it mixes well with methane. The characteristic rotting vegetation smell of the mix is widely known by natural gas customers as an indicator of a possible gas leak, even a minor one.

== Safety ==
The safety data sheet (SDS) lists methanethiol as a colorless, flammable gas with an extremely strong and repulsive smell. At very high concentrations it is highly toxic and affects the central nervous system. Its penetrating odor provides warning at dangerous concentrations. An odor threshold of 1 ppb has been reported. The United States OSHA Ceiling Limit is listed as 10 ppm.

=== Accidents ===
In 2001 a rail car fire of 25,000 US gallons (95,000 L) near Trenton, Michigan left three people dead and nine injured.

On November 15, 2014, at DuPont's La Porte, Texas facility, 24,000 lb (11,000 kg) of methyl mercaptan were released and travelled downwind into surrounding areas, killing four and injuring one other. In 2023, DuPont pleaded guilty to criminal negligence for its role in the leak. The company was ordered to pay a $12 million fine and donate an additional $4 million to the National Fish and Wildlife Foundation.

On July 14, 2022, an accidental release in Charlotte, North Carolina led to the temporary closure of local government offices.

On April 10, 2024, an accidental release of a higher-than-expected level of methyl mercaptan into the natural gas supply was attributed to an "upstream supplier" for Columbia Gas. This release was noticed by residents in at least Richland, Ashland, and Lorain counties in Ohio. Numerous schools cancelled their school days and numerous evacuations took place.
