= Amino acid synthesis =

Set of biochemical processes

Amino acid biosynthesis overview. The drawn molecules are in their neutral forms and do not fully correspond to their presented names. Humans can not synthesize all of these amino acids.

Amino acid biosynthesis is the set of biochemical processes (metabolic pathways) by which the amino acids are produced. The substrates for these processes are various compounds in the organism's diet or growth media. Not all organisms are able to synthesize all amino acids. For example, humans can synthesize 11 of the 20 standard amino acids. These 11 are called the non-essential amino acids.

== α-Ketoglutarates: glutamate, glutamine, proline, arginine ==
Most amino acids are synthesized from α-ketoacids, and later transaminated from another amino acid, usually glutamate. The enzyme involved in this reaction is an aminotransferase.

α-ketoacid + glutamate ⇄ amino acid + α-ketoglutarate

Glutamate itself is formed by amination of α-ketoglutarate:

α-ketoglutarate + NH^{+}_{4} ⇄ glutamate

The α-ketoglutarate family of amino acid synthesis (synthesis of glutamate, glutamine, proline and arginine) begins with α-ketoglutarate, an intermediate in the Citric Acid Cycle. The concentration of α-ketoglutarate is dependent on the activity and metabolism within the cell along with the regulation of enzymatic activity. In E. coli citrate synthase, the enzyme involved in the condensation reaction initiating the Citric Acid Cycle is strongly inhibited by α-ketoglutarate feedback inhibition and can be inhibited by DPNH as well high concentrations of ATP. This is one of the initial regulations of the α-ketoglutarate family of amino acid synthesis.

The regulation of the synthesis of glutamate from α-ketoglutarate is subject to regulatory control of the Citric Acid Cycle as well as mass action dependent on the concentrations of reactants involved due to the reversible nature of the transamination and glutamate dehydrogenase reactions.

The conversion of glutamate to glutamine is regulated by glutamine synthetase (GS) and is a key step in nitrogen metabolism. This enzyme is regulated by at least four different mechanisms: 1. Repression and depression due to nitrogen levels; 2. Activation and inactivation due to enzymatic forms (taut and relaxed); 3. Cumulative feedback inhibition through end product metabolites; and 4. Alterations of the enzyme due to adenylation and deadenylation. In rich nitrogenous media or growth conditions containing high quantities of ammonia there is a low level of GS, whereas in limiting quantities of ammonia the specific activity of the enzyme is 20-fold higher. The confirmation of the enzyme plays a role in regulation depending on if GS is in the taut or relaxed form. The taut form of GS is fully active but, the removal of manganese converts the enzyme to the relaxed state. The specific conformational state occurs based on the binding of specific divalent cations and is also related to adenylation. The feedback inhibition of GS is due to a cumulative feedback due to several metabolites including L-tryptophan, L-histidine, AMP, CTP, glucosamine-6-phosphate and carbamyl phosphate, alanine, and glycine. An excess of any one product does not individually inhibit the enzyme but a combination or accumulation of all the end products have a strong inhibitory effect on the synthesis of glutamine. Glutamine synthase activity is also inhibited via adenylation. The adenylation activity is catalyzed by the bifunctional adenylyltransferase/adenylyl removal (AT/AR) enzyme. Glutamine and a regulatory protein called PII act together to stimulate adenylation.

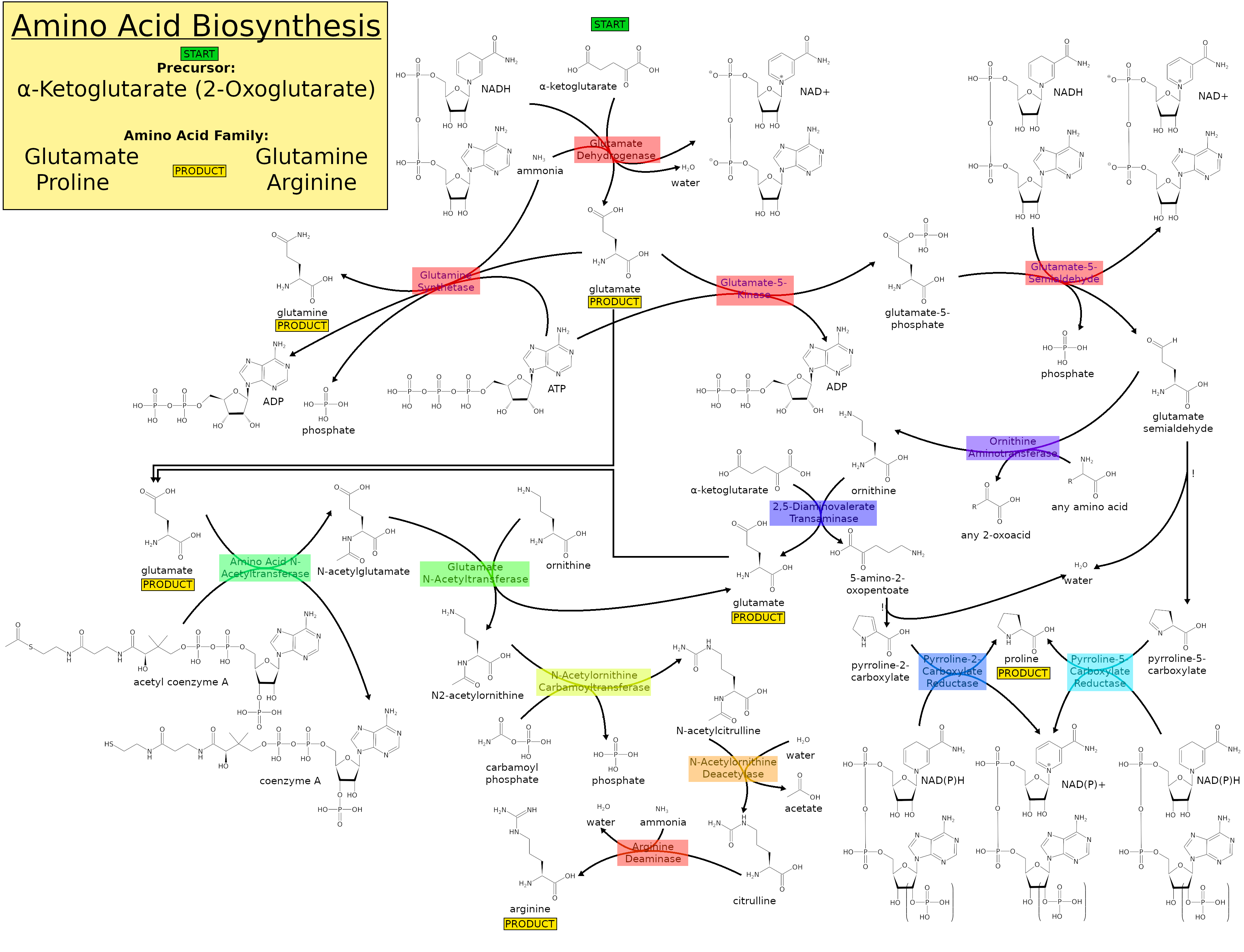
This diagram shows the biosynthesis (anabolism) of amino acids glutamate, glutamine, proline, and arginine from the precursor alpha-ketoglutarate.

The regulation of proline biosynthesis can depend on the initial controlling step through negative feedback inhibition. In E. coli, proline allosterically inhibits Glutamate 5-kinase which catalyzes the reaction from L-glutamate to an unstable intermediate L-γ-Glutamyl phosphate.

Arginine synthesis also utilizes negative feedback as well as repression through a repressor encoded by the gene argR. The gene product of argR, ArgR an aporepressor, and arginine as a corepressor affect the operon of arginine biosynthesis. The degree of repression is determined by the concentrations of the repressor protein and corepressor level.

== Erythrose 4-phosphate and phosphoenolpyruvate: phenylalanine, tyrosine, and tryptophan ==
Phenylalanine, tyrosine, and tryptophan, the aromatic amino acids, arise from chorismate. The first step, condensation of 3-deoxy-D-arabino-heptulosonic acid 7-phosphate (DAHP) from PEP/E4P, uses three isoenzymes AroF, AroG, and AroH. Each one of these has its synthesis regulated from tyrosine, phenylalanine, and tryptophan, respectively. The rest of the enzymes in the common pathway (conversion of DAHP to chorismate) appear to be synthesized constitutively, except for shikimate kinase, which can be inhibited by shikimate through linear mixed-type inhibition.

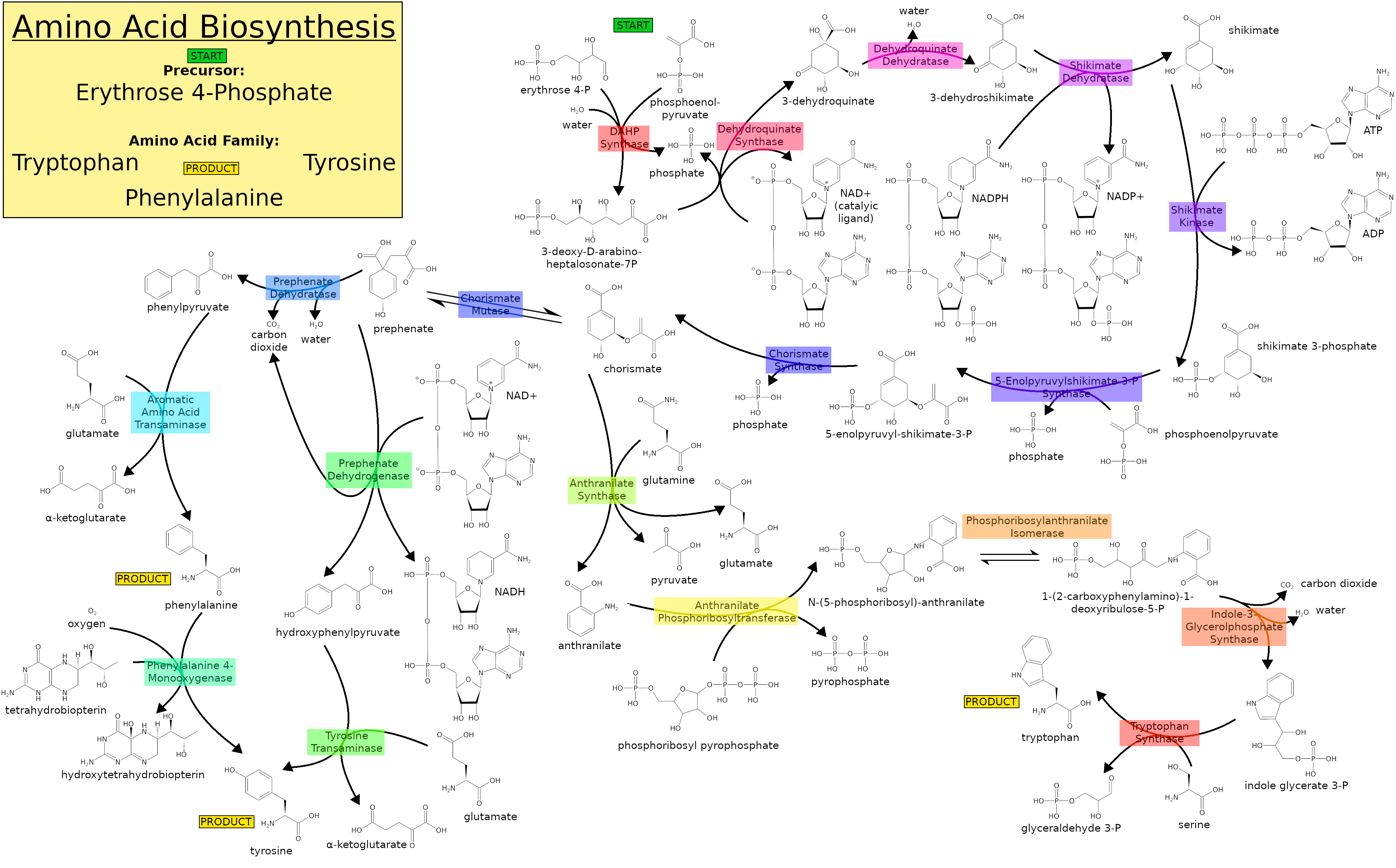
This diagram shows the biosynthesis (anabolism) of amino acids tryptophan, tyrosine, and phenylalanine from the precursor erythrose 4-phosphate.

Tyrosine and phenylalanine are biosynthesized from prephenate, which is converted to an amino acid-specific intermediate. This process is mediated by a phenylalanine (PheA) or tyrosine (TyrA) specific chorismate mutase-prephenate dehydrogenase. PheA uses a simple dehydrogenase to convert prephenate to phenylpyruvate, while TyrA uses a NAD-dependent dehydrogenase to make 4-hydroxylphenylpyruvate. Both PheA and TyrA are feedback inhibited by their respective amino acids. Tyrosine can also be inhibited at the transcriptional level by the TyrR repressor. TyrR binds to the TyrR boxes on the operon near the promoter of the gene that it wants to repress.

Tryptophan biosynthesis involves conversion of chorismate to anthranilate using anthranilate synthase. This enzyme requires either glutamine as the amino group donor or ammonia itself. Anthranilate synthase is regulated by the gene products of trpE and trpG. trpE encodes the first subunit, which binds to chorismate and moves the amino group from the donor to chorismate. trpG encodes the second subunit, which facilitates the transfer of the amino group from glutamine. Anthranilate synthase is also regulated by feedback inhibition: tryptophan is a co-repressor to the TrpR repressor.

== Oxaloacetate/aspartate: lysine, asparagine, methionine, threonine, and isoleucine ==
The oxaloacetate/aspartate family of amino acids is composed of lysine, asparagine, methionine, threonine, and isoleucine. Aspartate can be converted into lysine, asparagine, methionine and threonine. Threonine also gives rise to isoleucine.

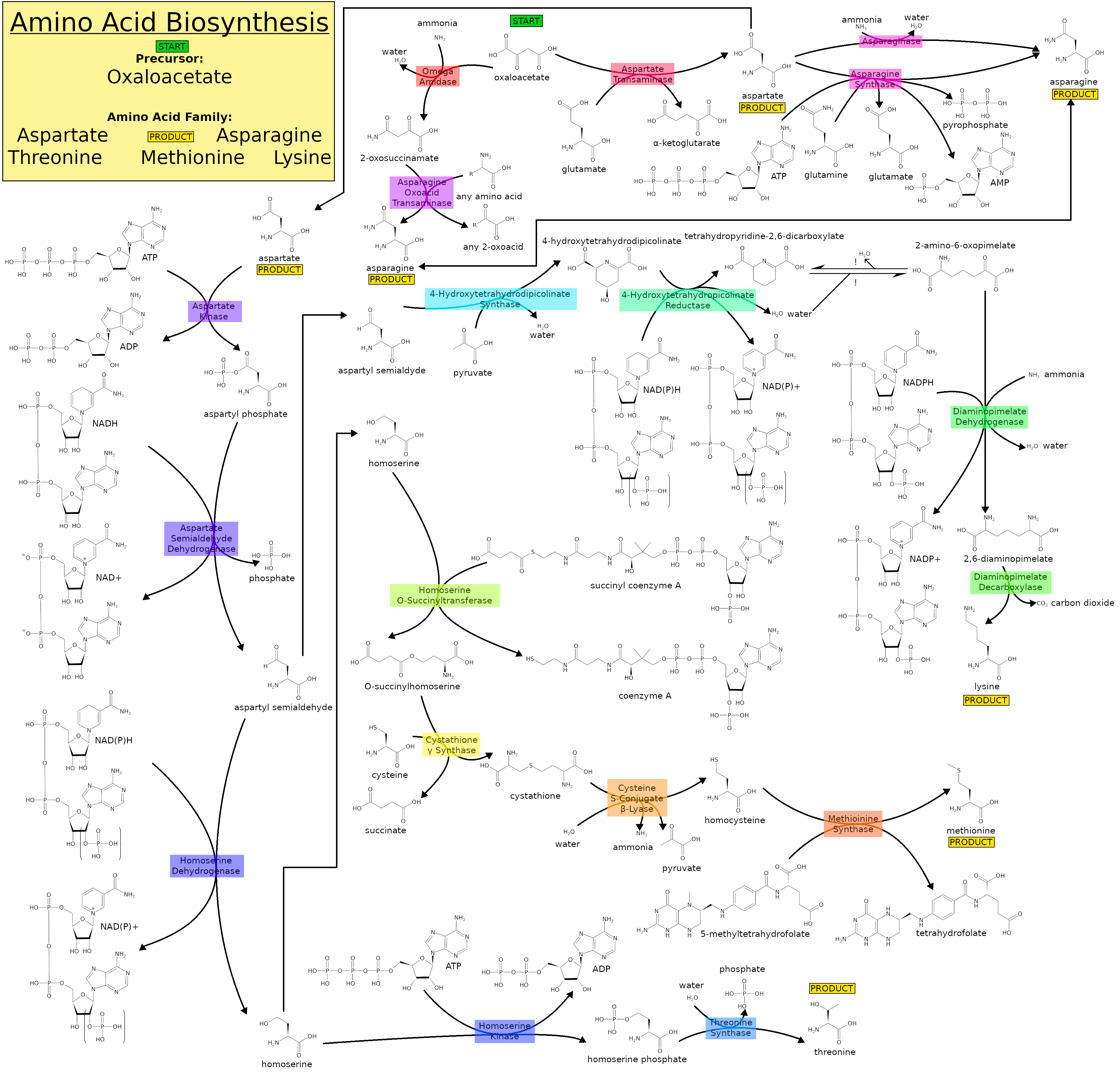
This diagram shows the biosynthesis (anabolism) of amino acids aspartate, asparagine, threonine, methionine, lysine from the precursor oxaloacetate.

The associated enzymes are subject to regulation via feedback inhibition and/or repression at the genetic level. As is typical in highly branched metabolic pathways, additional regulation at each branch point of the pathway. This type of regulatory scheme allows control over the total flux of the aspartate pathway in addition to the total flux of individual amino acids. The aspartate pathway uses L-aspartic acid as the precursor for the biosynthesis of one-fourth of the building block amino acids.

=== Aspartate ===
The biosynthesis of aspartate frequently involves the transamination of oxaloacetate.

The enzyme aspartokinase, which catalyzes the phosphorylation of aspartate and initiates its conversion into other amino acids, can be broken up into 3 isozymes, AK-I, II and III. AK-I is feed-back inhibited by threonine, while AK-II and III are inhibited by lysine. As a sidenote, AK-III catalyzes the phosphorylation of aspartic acid that is the committed step in this biosynthetic pathway. Aspartate kinase becomes downregulated by the presence of threonine or lysine.

=== Lysine ===
Lysine is synthesized from aspartate via the diaminopimelate (DAP) pathway. The initial two stages of the DAP pathway are catalyzed by aspartokinase and aspartate semialdehyde dehydrogenase. These enzymes play a key role in the biosynthesis of lysine, threonine, and methionine. There are two bifunctional aspartokinase/homoserine dehydrogenases, ThrA and MetL, in addition to a monofunctional aspartokinase, LysC. Transcription of aspartokinase genes is regulated by concentrations of the subsequently produced amino acids, lysine, threonine, and methionine. The higher these amino acids concentrations, the less the gene is transcribed. ThrA and LysC are also feed-back inhibited by threonine and lysine. Finally, DAP decarboxylase LysA mediates the last step of the lysine synthesis and is common for all studied bacterial species. The formation of aspartate kinase (AK), which catalyzes the phosphorylation of aspartate and initiates its conversion into other amino acids, is also inhibited by both lysine and threonine, which prevents the formation of the amino acids derived from aspartate. Additionally, high lysine concentrations inhibit the activity of dihydrodipicolinate synthase (DHPS). So, in addition to inhibiting the first enzyme of the aspartate families biosynthetic pathway, lysine also inhibits the activity of the first enzyme after the branch point, i.e. the enzyme that is specific for lysine's own synthesis.

=== Asparagine ===
The biosynthesis of asparagine originates with aspartate using a transaminase enzyme. The enzyme asparagine synthetase produces asparagine, AMP, glutamate, and pyrophosphate from aspartate, glutamine, and ATP. In the asparagine synthetase reaction, ATP is used to activate aspartate, forming β-aspartyl-AMP. Glutamine donates an ammonium group, which reacts with β-aspartyl-AMP to form asparagine and free AMP.

The biosynthesis of aspartate and asparagine from oxaloacetate.

Two asparagine synthetases are found in bacteria. Both are referred to as the AsnC protein. They are coded for by the genes AsnA and AsnB. AsnC is autogenously regulated, which is where the product of a structural gene regulates the expression of the operon in which the genes reside. The stimulating effect of AsnC on AsnA transcription is downregulated by asparagine. However, the autoregulation of AsnC is not affected by asparagine.

=== Methionine ===
Biosynthesis by the transsulfuration pathway starts with aspartic acid. Relevant enzymes include aspartokinase, aspartate-semialdehyde dehydrogenase, homoserine dehydrogenase, homoserine O-transsuccinylase, cystathionine-γ-synthase, Cystathionine-β-lyase (in mammals, this step is performed by homocysteine methyltransferase or betaine—homocysteine S-methyltransferase.)

Methionine biosynthesis is subject to tight regulation. The repressor protein MetJ, in cooperation with the corepressor protein S-adenosyl-methionine, mediates the repression of methionine's biosynthesis. The regulator MetR is required for MetE and MetH gene expression and functions as a transactivator of transcription for these genes. MetR transcriptional activity is regulated by homocysteine, which is the metabolic precursor of methionine. It is also known that vitamin B12 can repress MetE gene expression, which is mediated by the MetH holoenzyme.

=== Threonine ===
In plants and microorganisms, threonine is synthesized from aspartic acid via α-aspartyl-semialdehyde and homoserine. Homoserine undergoes O-phosphorylation; this phosphate ester undergoes hydrolysis concomitant with relocation of the OH group. Enzymes involved in a typical biosynthesis of threonine include aspartokinase, β-aspartate semialdehyde dehydrogenase, homoserine dehydrogenase, homoserine kinase, threonine synthase.

The biosynthesis of threonine is regulated via allosteric regulation of its precursor, homoserine, by structurally altering the enzyme homoserine dehydrogenase. This reaction occurs at a key branch point in the pathway, with the substrate homoserine serving as the precursor for the biosynthesis of lysine, methionine, threonin and isoleucine. High levels of threonine result in low levels of homoserine synthesis. The synthesis of aspartate kinase (AK), which catalyzes the phosphorylation of aspartate and initiates its conversion into other amino acids, is feed-back inhibited by lysine, isoleucine, and threonine, which prevents the synthesis of the amino acids derived from aspartate. So, in addition to inhibiting the first enzyme of the aspartate families biosynthetic pathway, threonine also inhibits the activity of the first enzyme after the branch point, i.e. the enzyme that is specific for threonine's own synthesis.

=== Isoleucine ===
In plants and microorganisms, isoleucine is biosynthesized from pyruvic acid and alpha-ketoglutarate. Enzymes involved in this biosynthesis include acetolactate synthase (also known as acetohydroxy acid synthase), acetohydroxy acid isomeroreductase, dihydroxyacid dehydratase, and valine aminotransferase.

In terms of regulation, the enzymes threonine deaminase, dihydroxy acid dehydrase, and transaminase are controlled by end-product regulation. i.e. the presence of isoleucine will downregulate threonine biosynthesis. High concentrations of isoleucine also result in the downregulation of aspartate's conversion into the aspartyl-phosphate intermediate, hence halting further biosynthesis of lysine, methionine, threonine, and isoleucine.

== Ribose 5-phosphates: histidine ==
In E. coli, the biosynthesis begins with phosphorylation of 5-phosphoribosyl-pyrophosphate (PRPP), catalyzed by ATP-phosphoribosyl transferase. Phosphoribosyl-ATP converts to phosphoribosyl-AMP (PRAMP). His4 then catalyzes the formation of phosphoribosylformiminoAICAR-phosphate, which is then converted to phosphoribulosylformimino-AICAR-P by the His6 gene product. His7 splits phosphoribulosylformimino-AICAR-P to form D-erythro-imidazole-glycerol-phosphate. After, His3 forms imidazole acetol-phosphate releasing water. His5 then makes L-histidinol-phosphate, which is then hydrolyzed by His2 making histidinol. His4 catalyzes the oxidation of L-histidinol to form L-histidinal, an amino aldehyde. In the last step, L-histidinal is converted to L-histidine.

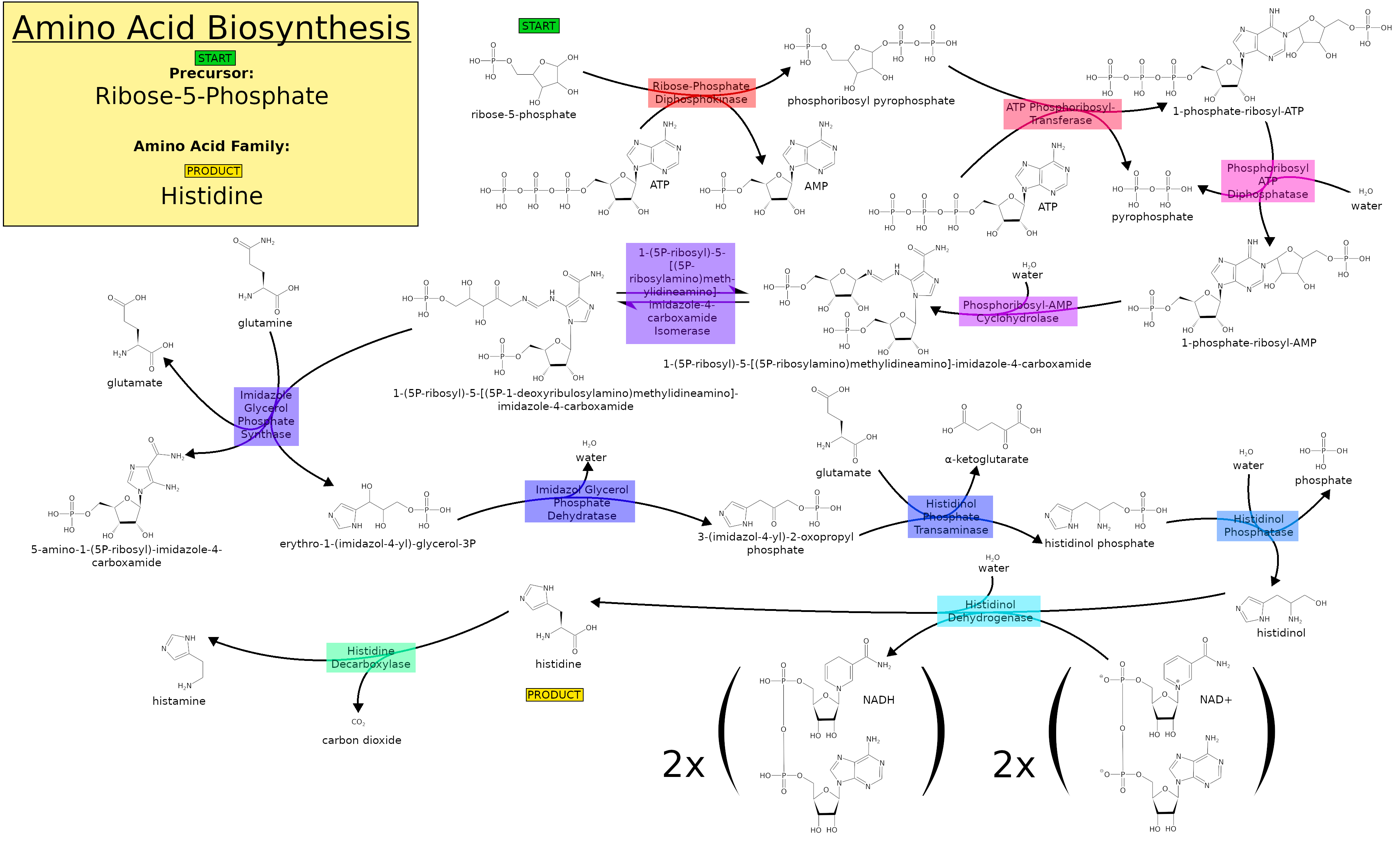
This diagram shows the biosynthesis (anabolism) of amino acid histidine from the precursor ribose-5-phosphate.

In general, the histidine biosynthesis is very similar in plants and microorganisms.

HisG → HisE/HisI → HisA → HisH → HisF → HisB → HisC → HisB → HisD (HisE/I and HisB are both bifunctional enzymes)

The enzymes are coded for on the His operon. This operon has a distinct block of the leader sequence, called block 1:

Met-Thr-Arg-Val-Gln-Phe-Lys-His-His-His-His-His-His-His-Pro-Asp

This leader sequence is important for the regulation of histidine in E. coli. The His operon operates under a system of coordinated regulation where all the gene products will be repressed or depressed equally. The main factor in the repression or derepression of histidine synthesis is the concentration of histidine charged tRNAs. The regulation of histidine is actually quite simple considering the complexity of its biosynthesis pathway and, it closely resembles regulation of tryptophan. In this system the full leader sequence has 4 blocks of complementary strands that can form hairpin loops structures. Block one, shown above, is the key to regulation. When histidine charged tRNA levels are low in the cell the ribosome will stall at the string of His residues in block 1. This stalling of the ribosome will allow complementary strands 2 and 3 to form a hairpin loop. The loop formed by strands 2 and 3 forms an anti-terminator and translation of the his genes will continue and histidine will be produced. However, when histidine charged tRNA levels are high the ribosome will not stall at block 1, this will not allow strands 2 and 3 to form a hairpin. Instead strands 3 and 4 will form a hairpin loop further downstream of the ribosome. The hairpin loop formed by strands 3 and 4 is a terminating loop, when the ribosome comes into contact with the loop, it will be “knocked off” the transcript. When the ribosome is removed the His genes will not be translated and histidine will not be produced by the cell.

== 3-Phosphoglycerates: serine, glycine, cysteine ==
The 3-Phosphoglycerate family of amino acids includes serine, glycine, and cysteine.

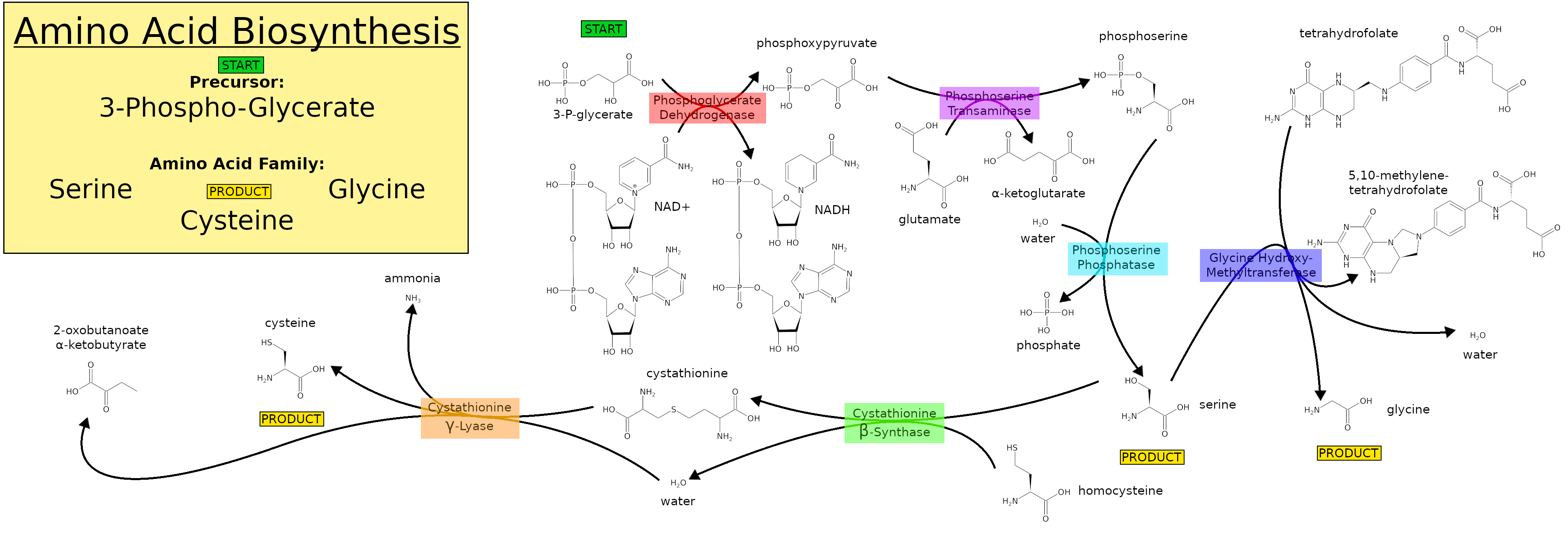
This diagram shows the biosynthesis (anabolism) of amino acids serine, glycine, and cysteine from the precursor 3-phosphoglycerate.

=== Serine ===
Serine is the first amino acid in this family to be produced; it is then modified to produce both glycine and cysteine (and many other biologically important molecules). Serine is formed from 3-phosphoglycerate in the following pathway:

3-phosphoglycerate → phosphohydroxyl-pyruvate → phosphoserine → serine

The conversion from 3-phosphoglycerate to phosphohydroxyl-pyruvate is achieved by the enzyme phosphoglycerate dehydrogenase. This enzyme is the key regulatory step in this pathway. Phosphoglycerate dehydrogenase is regulated by the concentration of serine in the cell. At high concentrations this enzyme will be inactive and serine will not be produced. At low concentrations of serine the enzyme will be fully active and serine will be produced by the bacterium. Since serine is the first amino acid produced in this family both glycine and cysteine will be regulated by the available concentration of serine in the cell.

=== Glycine ===
Glycine is biosynthesized from serine, catalyzed by serine hydroxymethyltransferase (SHMT). The enzyme effectively replaces a hydroxymethyl group with a hydrogen atom.

SHMT is coded by the gene glyA. The regulation of glyA is complex and is known to incorporate serine, glycine, methionine, purines, thymine, and folates, The full mechanism has yet to be elucidated. The methionine gene product MetR and the methionine intermediate homocysteine are known to positively regulate glyA. Homocysteine is a coactivator of glyA and must act in concert with MetR. On the other hand, PurR, a protein which plays a role in purine synthesis and S-adeno-sylmethionine are known to down regulate glyA. PurR binds directly to the control region of glyA and effectively turns the gene off so that glycine will not be produced by the bacterium.

=== Cysteine ===
The genes required for the synthesis of cysteine are coded for on the cys regulon. The integration of sulfur is positively regulated by CysB. Effective inducers of this regulon are N-acetyl-serine (NAS) and very small amounts of reduced sulfur. CysB functions by binding to DNA half sites on the cys regulon. These half sites differ in quantity and arrangement depending on the promoter of interest. There is however one half site that is conserved. It lies just upstream of the -35 site of the promoter. There are also multiple accessory sites depending on the promoter. In the absence of the inducer, NAS, CysB will bind the DNA and cover many of the accessory half sites. Without the accessory half sites the regulon cannot be transcribed and cysteine will not be produced. It is believed that the presence of NAS causes CysB to undergo a conformational change. This conformational change allows CysB to bind properly to all the half sites and causes the recruitment of the RNA polymerase. The RNA polymerase will then transcribe the cys regulon and cysteine will be produced.

Further regulation is required for this pathway, however. CysB can down regulate its own transcription by binding to its own DNA sequence and blocking the RNA polymerase. In this case NAS will act to disallow the binding of CysB to its own DNA sequence. OAS is a precursor of NAS, cysteine itself can inhibit CysE which functions to create OAS. Without the necessary OAS, NAS will not be produced and cysteine will not be produced. There are two other negative regulators of cysteine. These are the molecules sulfide and thiosulfate, they act to bind to CysB and they compete with NAS for the binding of CysB.

== Pyruvate: alanine, valine, and leucine ==
Pyruvate, the result of glycolysis, can feed into both the TCA cycle and fermentation processes. Reactions beginning with either one or two molecules of pyruvate lead to the synthesis of alanine, valine, and leucine. Feedback inhibition of final products is the main method of inhibition, and, in E. coli, the ilvEDA operon also plays a part in this regulation.

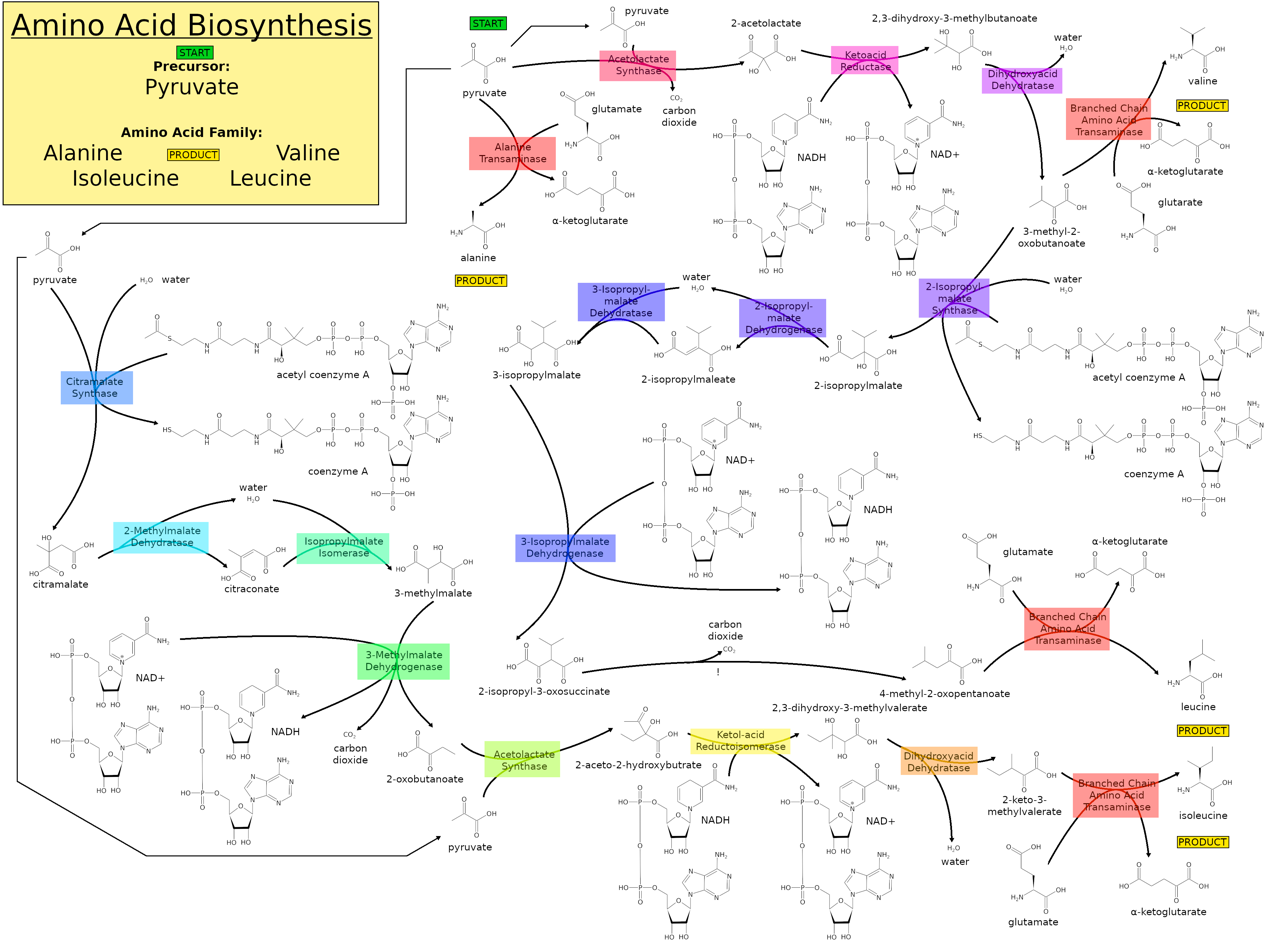
This diagram shows the biosynthesis (anabolism) of amino acids alanine, valine, isoleucine, and leucine from the precursor pyruvate.

=== Alanine ===
Alanine is produced by the transamination of one molecule of pyruvate using two alternate steps: 1) conversion of glutamate to α-ketoglutarate using a glutamate-alanine transaminase, and 2) conversion of valine to α-ketoisovalerate via Transaminase C.

Not much is known about the regulation of alanine synthesis. The only definite method is the bacterium's ability to repress Transaminase C activity by either valine or leucine (see ilvEDA operon). Other than that, alanine biosynthesis does not seem to be regulated.

=== Valine ===
Valine is produced by a four-enzyme pathway. It begins with the condensation of two equivalents of pyruvate catalyzed by acetohydroxy acid synthase yielding α-acetolactate. The second step involves the NADPH^{+}-dependent reduction of α-acetolactate and migration of methyl groups to produce α, β-dihydroxyisovalerate. This is catalyzed by acetohydroxy isomeroreductase. The third step is the dehydration of α, β-dihydroxyisovalerate catalyzed by dihydroxy acid dehydrase. In the fourth and final step, the resulting α-ketoisovalerate undergoes transamination catalyzed either by an alanine-valine transaminase or a glutamate-valine transaminase. Valine biosynthesis is subject to feedback inhibition in the production of acetohydroxy acid synthase.

=== Leucine ===
The leucine synthesis pathway diverges from the valine pathway beginning with α-ketoisovalerate. α-Isopropylmalate synthase catalyzes this condensation with acetyl CoA to produce α-isopropylmalate. An isomerase converts α-isopropylmalate to β-isopropylmalate. The third step is the NAD^{+}-dependent oxidation of β-isopropylmalate catalyzed by a dehydrogenase. The final step is the transamination of the α-ketoisocaproate by the action of a glutamate-leucine transaminase.

Leucine, like valine, regulates the first step of its pathway by inhibiting the action of the α-Isopropylmalate synthase. Because leucine is synthesized by a diversion from the valine synthetic pathway, the feedback inhibition of valine on its pathway also can inhibit the synthesis of leucine.

==== ilvEDA operon ====
The genes that encode both the dihydroxy acid dehydrase used in the creation of α-ketoisovalerate and Transaminase E, as well as other enzymes are encoded on the ilvEDA operon. This operon is bound and inactivated by valine, leucine, and isoleucine. (Isoleucine is not a direct derivative of pyruvate, but is produced by the use of many of the same enzymes used to produce valine and, indirectly, leucine.) When one of these amino acids is limited, the gene furthest from the amino-acid binding site of this operon can be transcribed. When a second of these amino acids is limited, the next-closest gene to the binding site can be transcribed, and so forth.

== Commercial syntheses of amino acids ==
The commercial production of amino acids usually relies on mutant bacteria that overproduce individual amino acids using glucose as a carbon source. Some amino acids are produced by enzymatic conversions of synthetic intermediates. 2-Aminothiazoline-4-carboxylic acid is an intermediate in the industrial synthesis of L-cysteine for example. Aspartic acid is produced by the addition of ammonia to fumarate using a lyase.
