= ATP phosphoribosyltransferase =

Class of enzymes

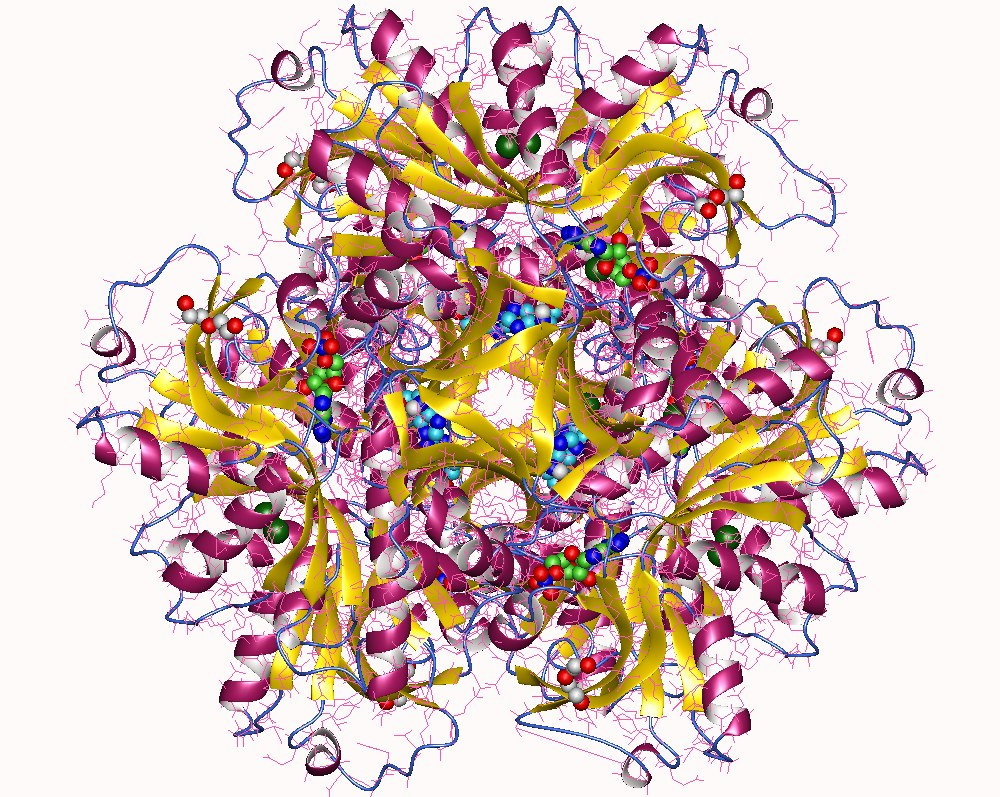
- ATP phosphoribosyltransferase hexamer, Campylobacter jejuni

Identifiers
- EC no.: 2.4.2.17
- CAS no.: 9031-46-3

Databases
- BRENDA: enzyme data
- ExPASy: NiceZyme view
- KEGG: enzyme entry
- MetaCyc: metabolic pathway
- Rhea: reactions
- PDB structures: RCSB PDB PDBe PDBsum
- Gene Ontology: AmiGO / QuickGO
Search
- PMC: articles
- PubMed: articles
- NCBI: proteins

ATP phosphoribosyltransferase
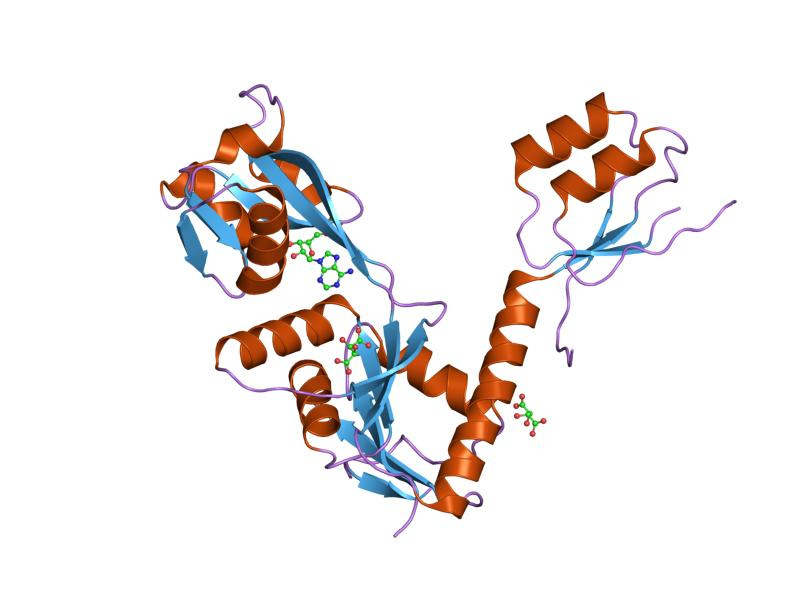
- structure of the E. coli ATP-phosphoribosyltransferase

Identifiers
- Symbol: HisG
- Pfam: PF01634
- Pfam clan: CL0177
- InterPro: IPR013820
- PROSITE: PDOC01020
- SCOP2: 1nh8 / SCOPe / SUPFAM
Available protein structures:
- PDB: IPR013820 PF01634 (ECOD; PDBsum)
- AlphaFold: IPR013820; PF01634

HisG, C-terminal domain
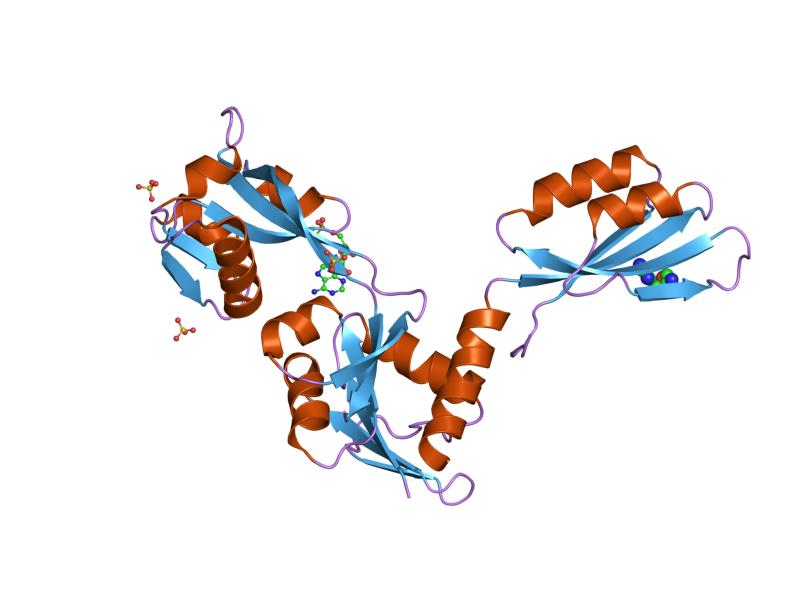
- ATP phosphoribosyltransferase (ATP-prtase) from Mycobacterium tuberculosis in complex with AMP and histidine

Identifiers
- Symbol: HisG_C
- Pfam: PF08029
- Pfam clan: CL0089
- InterPro: IPR013115
Available protein structures:
- PDB: IPR013115 PF08029 (ECOD; PDBsum)
- AlphaFold: IPR013115; PF08029

ATP phosphoribosyltransferase (EC 2.4.2.17) is an enzyme characterised from Salmonella typhimurium that catalyzes the first step in the biosynthesis of the amino acid histidine in bacteria, fungi and plants:

phosphoribosyl pyrophosphate
ATP
PP_{i}
1-(5-phospho-β-D-ribosyl)-ATP

It is a member of the large phosphoribosyltransferase superfamily of enzymes which catalyse the condensation of phosphoribosyl pyrophosphate with nitrogenous bases in the presence of divalent metal ions. In this reaction, it combines with a nitrogen atom in the adenine portion of adenosine triphosphate, giving 1-(5-phospho-β-D-ribosyl)-ATP, with pyrophosphate (PP_{i}) as a byproduct.

Histidine biosynthesis is an energetically expensive process and ATP phosphoribosyltransferase activity is subject to control at several levels. Transcriptional regulation is based primarily on nutrient conditions and determines the amount of enzyme present in the cell, while feedback inhibition rapidly modulates activity in response to cellular conditions. The enzyme has been shown to be inhibited by 1-(5-phospho-D-ribosyl)-ATP, histidine, ppGpp (a signal associated with adverse environmental conditions) and ADP and AMP (which reflect the overall energy status of the cell). As this pathway of histidine biosynthesis is present only in prokaryotes, plants and fungi, this enzyme is a promising target for the development of novel antimicrobial compounds and herbicides.

ATP phosphoribosyltransferase is found in two distinct forms: a long form containing two catalytic domains and a C-terminal regulatory domain, and a short form in which the regulatory domain is missing. The long form is catalytically competent, but in organisms with the short form, a histidyl-tRNA synthetase paralogue, HisZ, is required for enzyme activity.

The structures of the long form enzymes from Escherichia coli and Mycobacterium tuberculosis have been determined. Interconversion between the various forms is largely reversible and is influenced by the binding of the natural substrates and inhibitors of the enzyme. The two catalytic domains are linked by a two-stranded beta-sheet and together form a "periplasmic binding protein fold". A crevice between these domains contains the active site. The C-terminal domain is not directly involved in catalysis but appears to be involved the formation of hexamers, induced by the binding of inhibitors such as histidine to the enzyme, thus regulating activity.

The next steps in the pathway to histidine are catalysed by phosphoribosyl-ATP diphosphatase and phosphoribosyl-AMP cyclohydrolase.

== Structural studies ==
As of late 2007, 10 structures have been solved for this class of enzymes, with PDB accession codes PDB: 1H3D, PDB: 1NH7, PDB: 1NH8, PDB: 1O63, PDB: 1O64, PDB: 1Q1K, PDB: 1USY, PDB: 1VE4, PDB: 1Z7M, and PDB: 1Z7N.

== Nomenclature ==
This enzyme is a glycosyltransferase, specifically a pentosyltransferases. The systematic name of this enzyme class is 1-(5-phospho-D-ribosyl)-ATP:diphosphate phospho-alpha-D-ribosyl-transferase. Other names in use include phosphoribosyl-ATP pyrophosphorylase, adenosine triphosphate phosphoribosyltransferase, phosphoribosyladenosine triphosphate:pyrophosphate, phosphoribosyltransferase, phosphoribosyl ATP synthetase, phosphoribosyl ATP:pyrophosphate phosphoribosyltransferase, phosphoribosyl-ATP:pyrophosphate-phosphoribosyl phosphotransferase, phosphoribosyladenosine triphosphate pyrophosphorylase, and phosphoribosyladenosine triphosphate synthetase.
