= C20H20N2O4 =

The molecular formula C_{20}H_{20}N_{2}O_{4} (molar mass: 352.384 g/mol) may refer to:

- Nareline
- N-Feruloylserotonin
