= (R)-2-methylmalate dehydratase =

Class of enzymes

Identifiers
- EC no.: 4.2.1.35
- CAS no.: 9027-92-3

Databases
- IntEnz: IntEnz view
- BRENDA: BRENDA entry
- ExPASy: NiceZyme view
- KEGG: KEGG entry
- MetaCyc: metabolic pathway
- PRIAM: profile
- PDB structures: RCSB PDB PDBe PDBsum
- Gene Ontology: AmiGO / QuickGO
Search
- PMC: articles
- PubMed: articles
- NCBI: proteins

The enzyme (R)-2-methylmalate dehydratase (EC 4.2.1.35) catalyzes the chemical reaction

(R)-2-methylmalate $\rightleftharpoons$ 2-methylmaleate + H_{2}O

This enzyme belongs to the family of lyases, specifically the hydro-lyases, which cleave carbon-oxygen bonds. The systematic name of this enzyme class is (R)-2-methylmalate hydro-lyase (2-methylmaleate-forming). Other names in common use include citraconate hydratase, citraconase, citramalate hydro-lyase, (−)-citramalate hydro-lyase, and (R)-2-methylmalate hydro-lyase. This enzyme participates in valine, leucine and isoleucine biosynthesis and c5-branched dibasic acid metabolism. It employs one cofactor, iron.
