= Farinamycin =

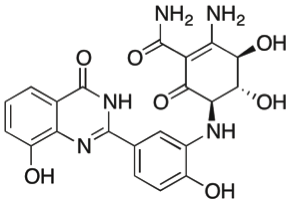

Names
- IUPAC name (3R,4R,5R)-2-amino-3,4-dihydroxy-5-((2-hydroxy-5-(8-hydroxy-4-oxo-3,4-dihydroquinazolin-2-yl)phenyl)amino)-6-oxocyclohex-1-enecarboxamide

Identifiers
3D model (JSmol)	Interactive image
ChEBI	CHEBI:69016
ChEMBL	ChEMBL1928033
ChemSpider	28289273
PubChem CID	136126569
CompTox Dashboard (EPA)	DTXSID001030381
- InChI: InChI=1S/C21H19N5O7/c22-13-12(19(23)32)16(29)15(18(31)17(13)30)24-9-6-7(4-5-10(9)27)20-25-14-8(21(33)26-20)2-1-3-11(14)28/h1-6,15,17-18,24,27-28,30-31H,22H2,(H2,23,32)(H,25,26,33)/t15-,17+,18+/m0/s1 Key: OLYXGVRSMULUQN-CGTJXYLNSA-N; InChI=1/C16H18N2O/c1-18-8-10(9-19)5-13-12-3-2-4-14-16(12)11(7-17-14)6-15(13)18/h2-5,7,13,15,17,19H,6,8-9H2,1H3/t13-,15-/m1/s1 Key: DAVNRFCJMIONPO-UKRRQHHQBW
- SMILES: C1=CC2=C(C(=C1)O)N=C(NC2=O)C3=CC(=C(C=C3)O)N[C@@H]4[C@H]([C@@H](C(=C(C4=O)C(=O)N)N)O)O

Properties
Chemical formula	C_{21}H_{19}N_{5}O_{7}
Molar mass	453.13
- Except where otherwise noted, data are given for materials in their standard state (at 25 °C [77 °F], 100 kPa). Infobox references

Farinamycin is a quinazoline metabolite that has been isolated from Streptomyces griseus. It is the first known metabolite to be produced by S. griseus that is not a phenoxazinone antibiotic. Farinamycin is formed from the condensation of 3-OH-anthranalite and 3,4-AHBA building blocks that later combine with Enaminomycin C biosynthetically. Many Streptomyces natural products have been used as antibiotics, antifungals, anticancer agents and immunosuppressive agents.

== Biosynthesis ==
Farinamycin is made of three different components: 3-OH-anthranilate (3-HAA), 3,4-aminohydroxybenzamide (3,4-AHBAm) and the natural product Enaminomycin C. 3-OH anthranilate is derived from the central shikimate pathway metabolite chorismate. Chorismate is made from shikimate and is then attacked by nascent ammonia to produce the ortho aminobenzoate isomer by anthranilate synthase. Hydrolysis and FMN mediated reduction leads to the 3-hydroxy aminobenzoate derivative.

3,4-AHBAm is made via the aminoshikimate pathway from L-Aspartate-4-semialdehyde and Dihydroxyacetone phosphate via an enzyme catalyzed aldol condensation followed by ring formation. Enaminomycin C is formed from anthranilate, which is made via the shikimate pathway as well. Subsequent oxidation is followed by a proposed dioxygenase mechanism that leads to epoxide formation. The final step is racemization.

The final quinazoline motif comes from a niementowski-type reaction from 3-HAA and 3,4-AHBAm followed by the nucleophilic oxirane ring opening of enaminomycin C to yield farinamycin.

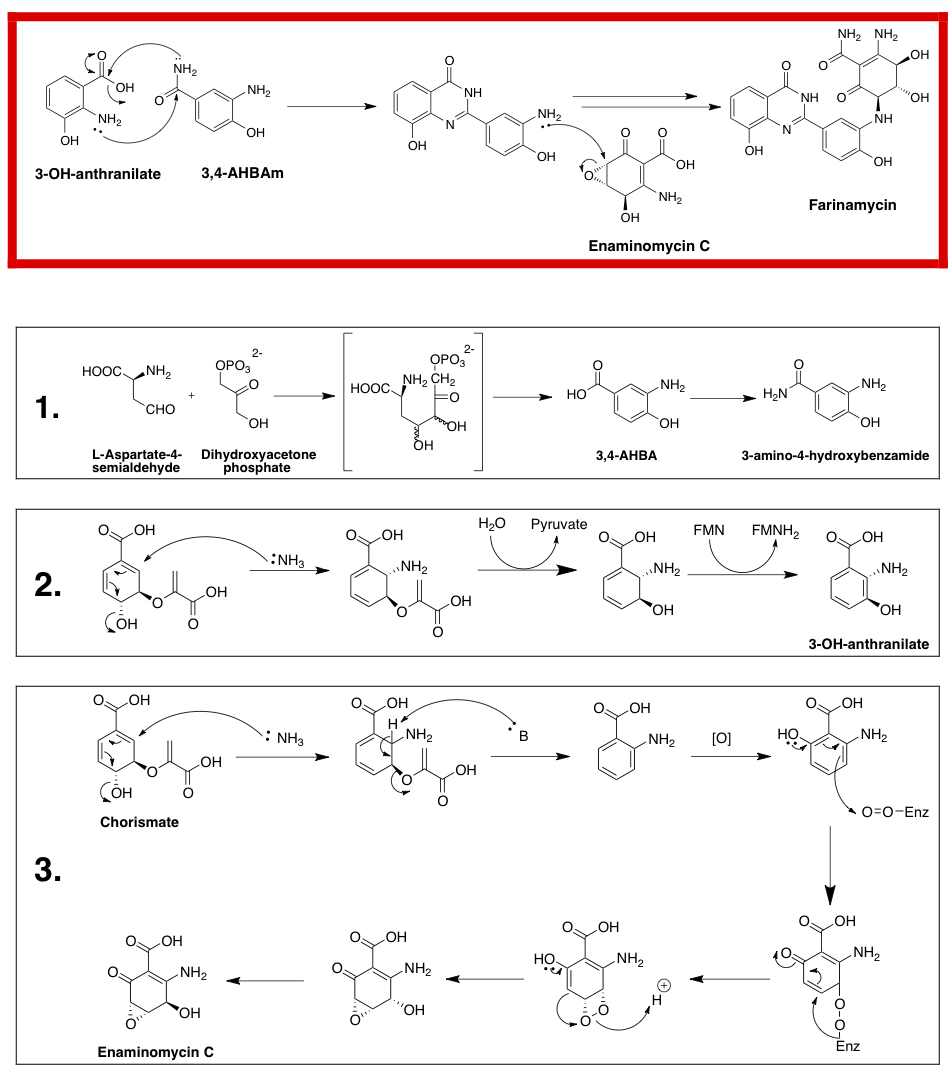
