= Nicotinate phosphoribosyltransferase =

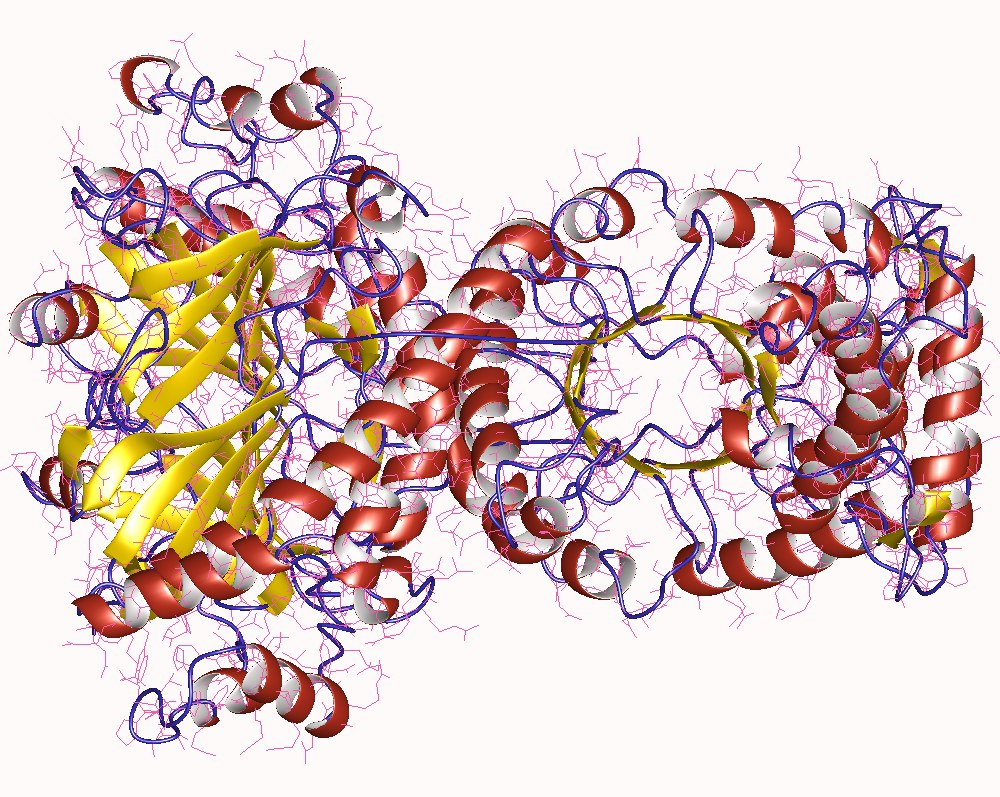
- Nicotinate phosphoribosyltransferase dimer, Human

Identifiers
- EC no.: 6.3.4.21
- CAS no.: 9030-26-6

Databases
- BRENDA: enzyme data
- ExPASy: NiceZyme view
- KEGG: enzyme entry
- MetaCyc: metabolic pathway
- Rhea: reactions
- PDB structures: RCSB PDB PDBe PDBsum
- Gene Ontology: AmiGO / QuickGO
Search
- PMC: articles
- PubMed: articles
- NCBI: proteins

NAPRT

Identifiers
- Aliases: NAPRT, NAPRT1, PP3856, nicotinate phosphoribosyltransferase
- External IDs: OMIM: 611552; MGI: 2442664; GeneCards: NAPRT
Available structures
PDB	Ortholog search: PDBe RCSB
PDB	List of PDB id codes 4YUB
Enzyme activity
EC #	BRENDA	ExPASy	KEGG	MetaCyc
6.3.4.21	↗	↗	↗	↗

Gene location (Human)
Chr.	Chromosome 8 (human)
Band	8q24.3	Start	143,574,785 bp
Band	8q24.3	End	143,578,649 bp

Gene location (Mouse)
Chr.	Chromosome 15 (mouse)
Band	15|15 D3	Start	75,762,805 bp
Band	15|15 D3	End	75,766,330 bp
RNA expression pattern
Bgee	Human / Mouse (ortholog); Top expressed in: mucosa of transverse colon; right lobe of liver; duodenum; skin of leg; skin of abdomen; apex of heart; blood; body of stomach; spleen; fundus / Top expressed in: duodenum; jejunum; left lobe of liver; epithelium of small intestine; ileum; right kidney; epithelium of stomach; proximal tubule; colon; esophagus; More reference expression data
BioGPS	n/a
Gene ontology
Molecular function	transferase activity; ligase activity; protein binding; nicotinate-nucleotide diphosphorylase (carboxylating) activity; nicotinate phosphoribosyltransferase activity; catalytic activity; metal ion binding
Cellular component	cytosol; extracellular exosome; extracellular region; cytoplasm; azurophil granule lumen
Biological process	pyridine nucleotide biosynthetic process; nicotinate nucleotide salvage; response to oxidative stress; NAD biosynthetic process; NAD biosynthesis via nicotinamide riboside salvage pathway; neutrophil degranulation; NAD salvage
Sources:Amigo / QuickGO
Orthologs
Databases	NCBI: entry; OMA: entry
Species	Human	Mouse
Entrez	93100	223646
Ensembl	ENSG00000278488; ENSG00000147813	ENSMUSG00000022574
UniProt	Q6XQN6	Q8CC86
RefSeq (mRNA)	NM_001286829; NM_145201; NM_001363145; NM_001363146	NM_172607
RefSeq (protein)	NP_001273758; NP_660202; NP_001350074; NP_001350075	NP_766195
Location (UCSC)	Chr 8: 143.57 – 143.58 Mb	Chr 15: 75.76 – 75.77 Mb
PubMed search
- Wikidata
View/Edit Human	View/Edit Mouse

In enzymology, a nicotinate phosphoribosyltransferase (EC 6.3.4.21) is an enzyme (encoded by NAPRT in humans) that catalyzes the chemical reaction

nicotinate + 5-phospho-α-D-ribose 1-diphosphate + ATP + H_{2}O $\rightleftharpoons$ nicotinate D-ribonucleotide + diphosphate + ADP + phosphate

Thus, the four substrates of this enzyme are nicotinate, 5-phospho-alpha-D-ribose 1-diphosphate, ATP, and H_{2}O, whereas its four products are nicotinate D-ribonucleotide, diphosphate, ADP, and phosphate.

This enzyme belongs to the family of ligases, specifically those forming generic carbon-nitrogen bonds. The systematic name of this enzyme class is 5-phospho-alpha-D-ribose 1-diphosphate:nicotinate ligase (ADP, diphosphate-forming) .

== Structural studies ==
As of late 2007, 7 structures have been solved for this class of enzymes, with PDB accession codes PDB: 1VLP, PDB: 1YBE, PDB: 1YIR, PDB: 1YTD, PDB: 1YTE, PDB: 1YTK, and PDB: 2F7F.
