= N-Feruloylserotonin =

Names
- Preferred IUPAC name (2E)-N-[2-(5-Hydroxy-1H-indol-3-yl)ethyl]-3-(4-hydroxy-3-methoxyphenyl)prop-2-enamide
- Other names Moschamine

Identifiers
CAS Number	193224-22-5
3D model (JSmol)	Interactive image
ChemSpider	4766454
PubChem CID	5969616
UNII	2PP8322487
CompTox Dashboard (EPA)	DTXSID70172925
- InChI: InChI=1S/C20H20N2O4/c1-26-19-10-13(2-6-18(19)24)3-7-20(25)21-9-8-14-12-22-17-5-4-15(23)11-16(14)17/h2-7,10-12,22-24H,8-9H2,1H3,(H,21,25)/b7-3+ Key: WGHKJYWENWLOMY-XVNBXDOJSA-N
- SMILES: COc1cc(ccc1O)/C=C/C(=O)NCCc2c[nH]c3c2cc(cc3)O

Properties
Chemical formula	C_{20}H_{20}N_{2}O_{4}
Molar mass	352.390 g·mol^{−1}
- Except where otherwise noted, data are given for materials in their standard state (at 25 °C [77 °F], 100 kPa). Infobox references

N-Feruloylserotonin an alkaloid and polyphenol found in safflower seed. Chemically, it is an amide formed between serotonin and ferulic acid. It has in vitro anti-atherogenic activity.

== Serotonin derivatives found in safflower seeds ==
N-Feruloylserotonin and N-(p-coumaroyl)serotonin are natural products that can be found in the extract of safflower seeds (Carthamus tinctorius). These natural products have been isolated and studied to investigate their antioxidant effects. These polyphenols have been utilized in traditional Chinese medicine and other eastern medicine practices to have strong antioxidant effects, chemotherapeutic effects, and atherosclerosis attenuation. It has been found that N-(p-coumaroyl) and N- feruloyl serotonin can suppress the expression of matrix metalloproteinases MMP3/13 and a disintegrin and metalloproteinase with thrombospondin motifs (ADAMTS), thus attenuating cartilage degradation.

== Biosynthesis ==
The biosynthetic pathway of N-feruloylserotonin and N-(p-coumaroyl)serotonin has been reported. In plants, the enzyme anthranilate synthase (AS) is composed of two subunits that modulate the production or suppression of tryptophan from chorismate. Tryptophan is then decarboxylated by tryptophan decarboxylase (TDC) into tryptamine. Tryptamine 5-hydroxylase (T5H) then hydroxylates tryptamine into serotonin. Serotonin, the precursor to N-(p-coumaroyl) and N-feruloylserotonin, is found in the seeds of the safflower plant. Hydroxycinnamic acids are then transferred to serotonin from hydroxycinnamoyl-CoA esters by hydroxycinnamoyl-CoA: serotonin N-(hydroxycinnamoyl)transferase (SHT).

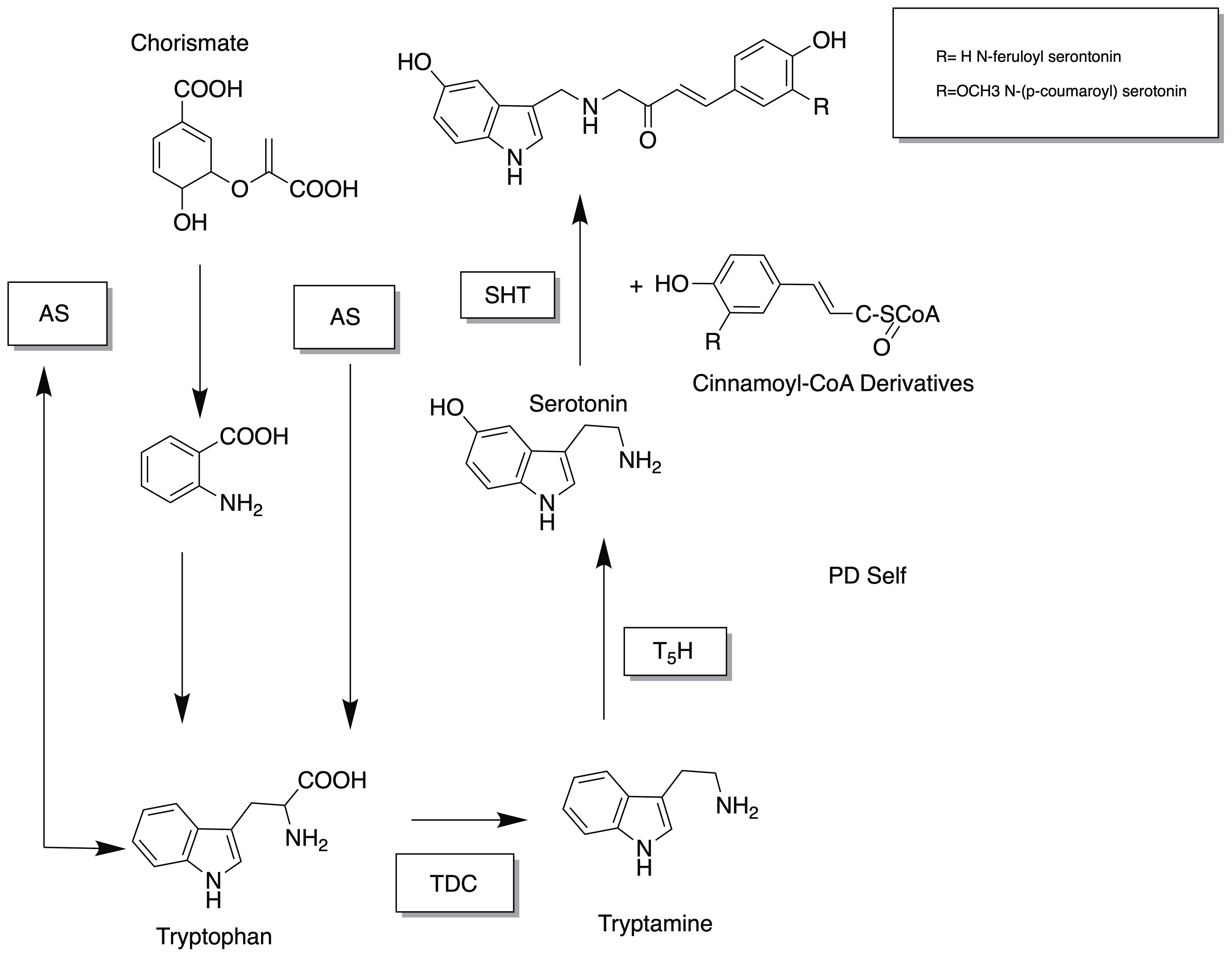
Biosynthesis of N-feruloylserotonin and N-(p-coumaroyl)serotonin
