= Xanthine phosphoribosyltransferase =

Class of enzymes

Identifiers
- EC no.: 2.4.2.22
- CAS no.: 9023-10-3

Databases
- IntEnz: IntEnz view
- BRENDA: BRENDA entry
- ExPASy: NiceZyme view
- KEGG: KEGG entry
- MetaCyc: metabolic pathway
- PRIAM: profile
- PDB structures: RCSB PDB PDBe PDBsum
- Gene Ontology: AmiGO / QuickGO
Search
- PMC: articles
- PubMed: articles
- NCBI: proteins

Xanthine phosphoribosyltransferase (EC 2.4.2.22) is an enzyme that catalyzes the phosphorolysis reaction

xanthosine monophosphate
PP_{i}
PP_{i}
phosphoribosyl pyrophosphate
+
xanthine

The two substrates of this enzyme characterised from Lactobacillus casei are xanthosine monophosphate and pyrophosphate (PP_{i}). Its products are phosphoribosyl pyrophosphate and xanthine.

This enzyme belongs to the family of glycosyltransferases, specifically the pentosyltransferases. The systematic name of this enzyme class is XMP:diphosphate 5-phospho-alpha-D-ribosyltransferase. Other names in common use include Xan phosphoribosyltransferase, xanthosine 5'-phosphate pyrophosphorylase, xanthylate pyrophosphorylase, xanthylic pyrophosphorylase, XMP pyrophosphorylase, 5-phospho-alpha-D-ribose-1-diphosphate:xanthine, phospho-D-ribosyltransferase, 9-(5-phospho-beta-D-ribosyl)xanthine:diphosphate, and 5-phospho-alpha-D-ribosyltransferase.

== Structural studies ==
As of late 2007, 6 structures have been solved for this class of enzymes, with PDB accession codes 1A95, 1A96, 1A97, 1A98, 1NUL, and 2FXV.
