= LysC =

Bacterial enzyme

LysC is a prokaryotic aspartokinase involved in the biosynthesis of the amino acid lysine. It is found in a variety of bacteria, including Bacillus subtilis, Escherichia coli and Corynebacterium glutamicum. It is notable for containing a riboswitch, a structure in its messenger RNA that prevents its translation when bound to lysine. Such lysine riboswitch thus acts as a mechanism of negative feedback.
