= Isoleucine (data page) =

Chemical data page

The complete data for Isoleucine
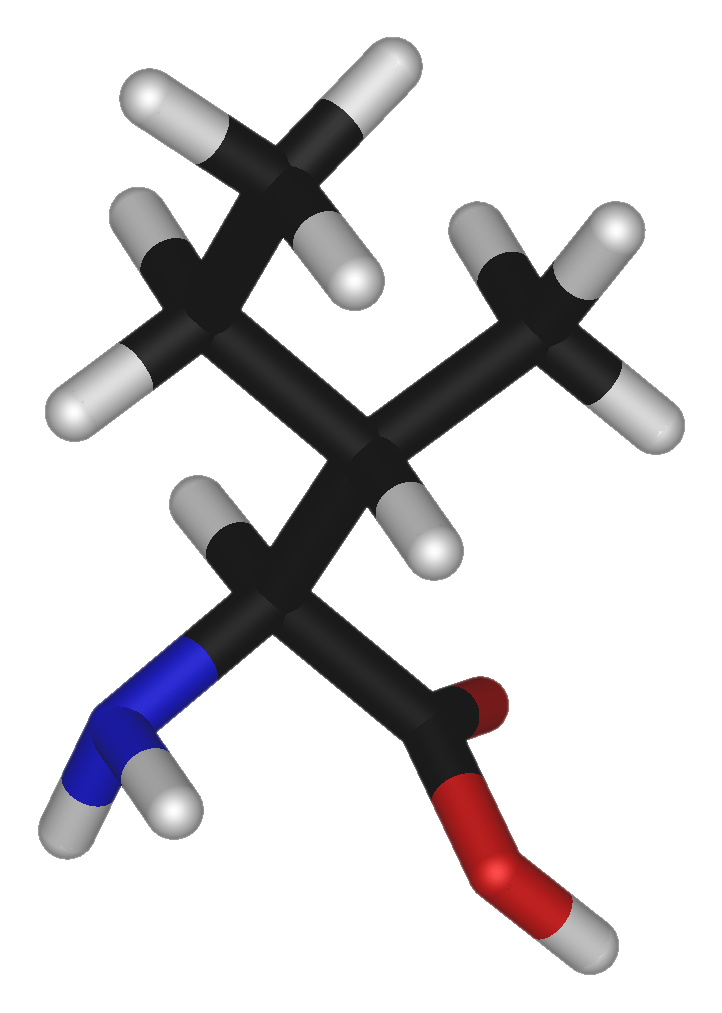
General information
Chemical formula: C_{6}H_{13}NO_{2}
Molar mass: 131.18 ^{a} g·mol^{−1}
Systematic name:
(2S,3S)-2-amino-3-methylpentanoic acid
Abbreviations: I, Ile
Synonyms:
{2/α}-amino-{3/β}-methylvaleric acid
3-methyl-{/erythro-}norvaline
Amino-sec-butyl-acetic acid
Amino(1-methylpropyl)-acetic acid
Database data
SMILES: CC[C@H](C)[C@@H](C(=O)O)N ^{b}
InChI=1/C6H13NO2/c1-3-4(2)5(7)6(8)9/h4-5H,3,7H2,1-2H3,(H,8,9)/t4-,5-/m0/s1/f/h8H ^{c}

ATC: N/A	CAS: 73-32-5	DrugBank: N/A	EINECS: 200-798-2 ^{d}	PubChem: 6306

Physical properties

Structure	Crystal data	Spectral data: UV-Vis / IR / NMR / MS

Phase behavior	Solid properties T_{m}: 284 °C	Liquid properties	Gas properties

Hazard properties

MSDS N/A	Main hazards: N/A	NFPA 704	Flash point: N/A	RTECS number: N/A

Chemical properties

XLogP: -1.743 ^{e}	pI: 6.02	pK_{a}: 2.26; 9.60	Tautomers:	Hydrogen bond: donor - 2 ^{f}; acceptor - 3 ^{g}

Pharmacological properties

This box:
- Except where noted otherwise, data relate to Standard temperature and pressure.
- Reliability of data general note.
