= Aspartate kinase =

Class of enzymes

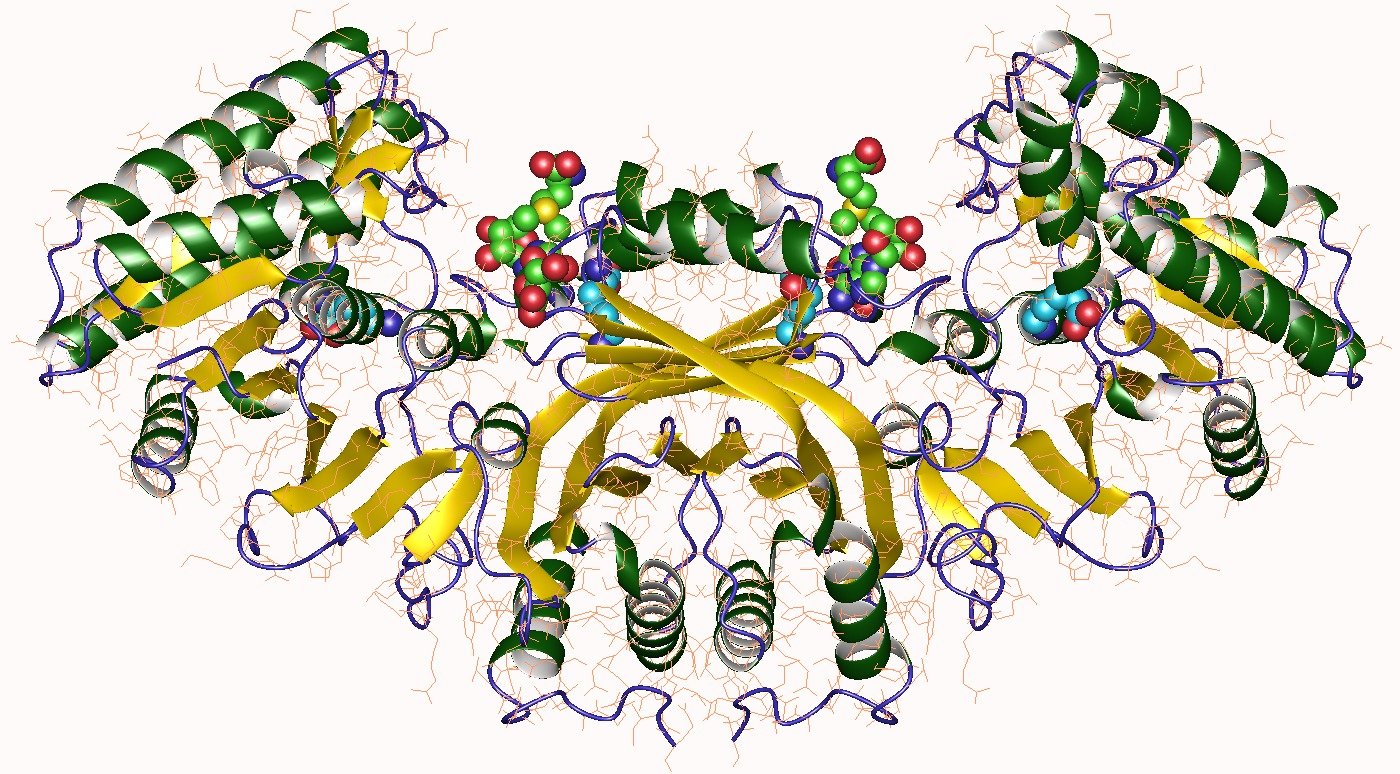
- Aspartate kinase homodimer, Arabidopsis thaliana

Identifiers
- EC no.: 2.7.2.4
- CAS no.: 9012-50-4

Databases
- IntEnz: IntEnz view
- BRENDA: BRENDA entry
- ExPASy: NiceZyme view
- KEGG: KEGG entry
- MetaCyc: metabolic pathway
- PRIAM: profile
- PDB structures: RCSB PDB PDBe PDBsum
Search
- PMC: articles
- PubMed: articles
- NCBI: proteins

Aspartate kinase or aspartokinase (AK) is an enzyme that catalyzes the phosphorylation of the amino acid aspartate. This reaction is the first step in the biosynthesis of three other amino acids: methionine, lysine, and threonine, known as the "aspartate family". Aspartokinases are present only in microorganisms and plants, but not in animals, which must obtain aspartate-family amino acids from their diet. Consequently, methionine, lysine and threonine are essential amino acids in animals.

== Function ==
Aspartate kinase uses the cofactor, adenosine triphosphate (ATP), to transfer a phosphate group to the amino acid L-aspartic acid, giving phosphoaspartate. Adenosine diphosphate (ADP) is a byproduct.

aspartic acid
ADP
ATP
ADP
ATP
phosphoaspartate

== Nomenclature ==
The generic abbreviation for aspartokinases is AK. However, the nomenclature for aspartokinase genes and proteins varies considerable among species. The main aspatokinases are lysC (Bacillus subtilis, Escherichia coli and many other bacteria), ask (Mycobacterium bovis, Thermus thermophilus), AK1–AK3 (Arabidopsis thaliana), FUB3 (Fusarium and Gibberella) and HOM3 (Saccharomyces cerevisiae). Additionally, apk is a synonym for lysC.

== Enzymatic regulation ==
Aspartokinases may use the morpheein model of allosteric regulation.

In Escherichia coli, aspartokinase is present as three independently regulated isozymes (thrA, metL and lysC), each of which is specific to one of the three downstream biochemical pathways. This allows the independent regulation of the rates of methionine, lysine, and threonine production. The forms that produce threonine and lysine are subject to feedback inhibition and can be repressed at the level of gene expression by high concentrations of their end-products. Absence from animals makes these enzymes key targets for new herbicides and biocides and for improvements in nutritional value of crops.
