= Isoleucine =

l-Isoleucine
- Chemical structure of Isoleucine Skeletal formula of L-isoleucine

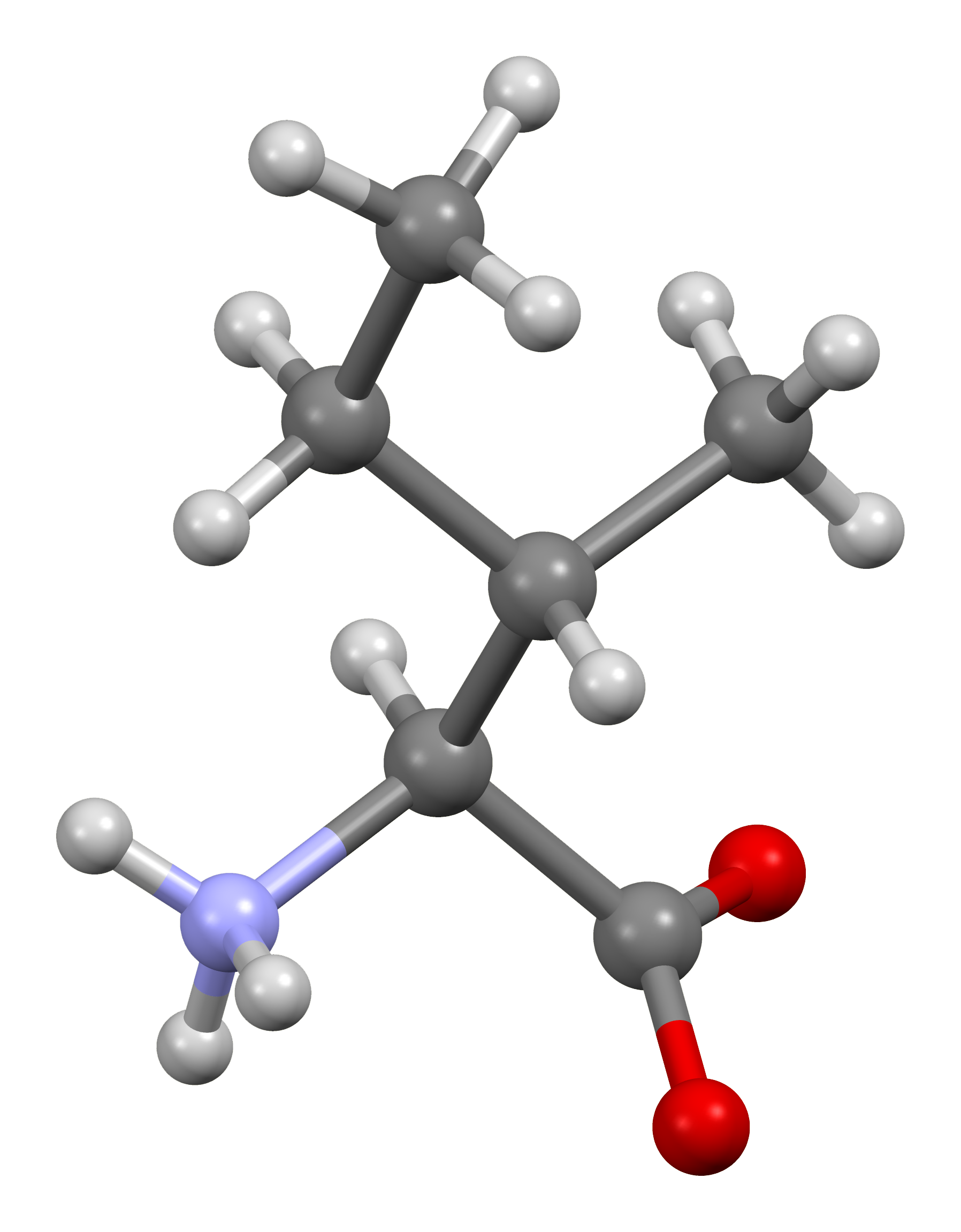
Ball-and-stick model of L-isoleucine
Ball-and-stick model
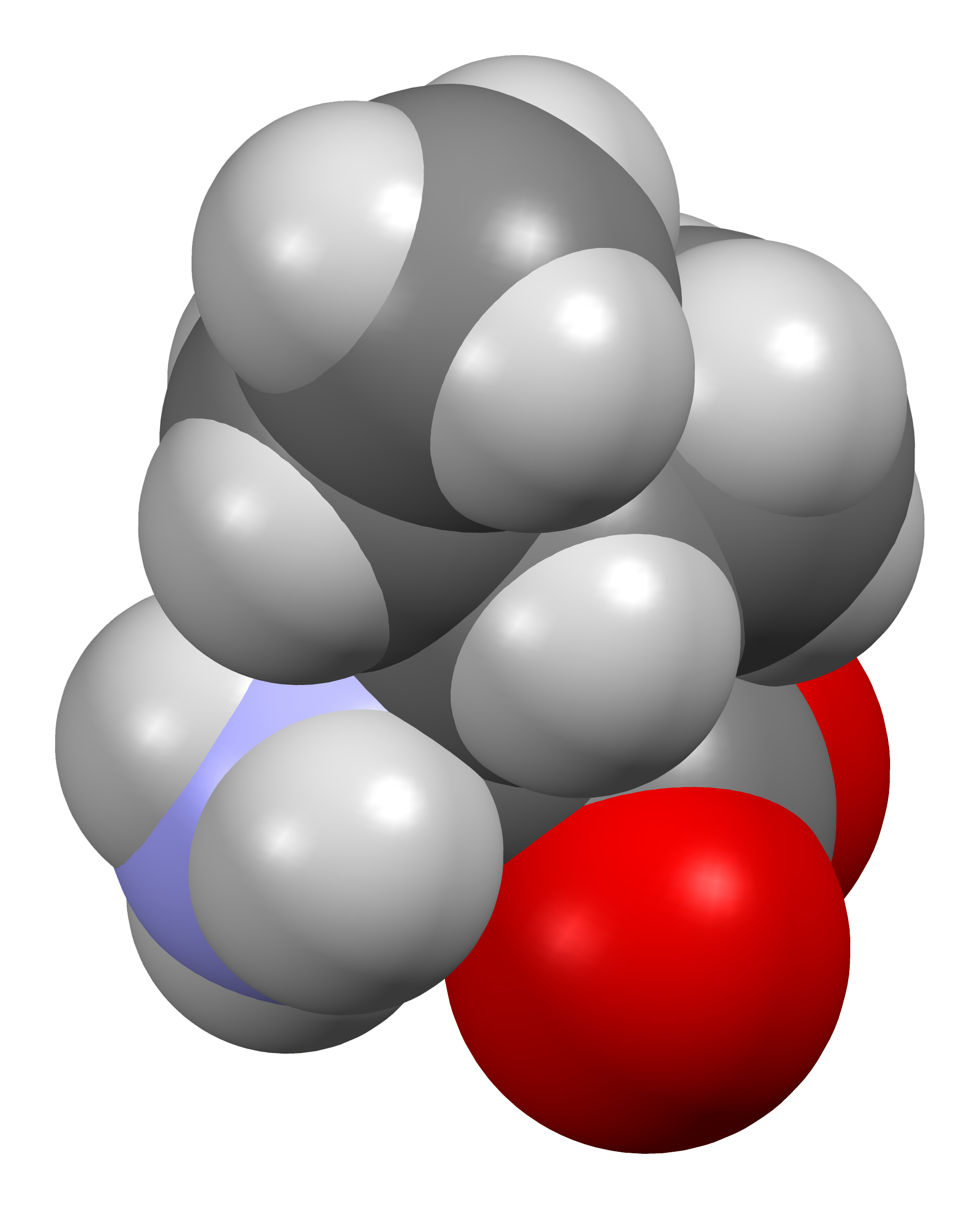
Space-filling model of L-isoleucine
Space-filling model

Names
- IUPAC name Isoleucine
- Systematic IUPAC name 2-Amino-3-methylpentanoic acid

Identifiers
| CAS Number | 73-32-5; 443-79-8 D enantiomer; 319-78-8 racemic |
| 3D model (JSmol) | Interactive image; Zwitterion: Interactive image |
| ChEBI | CHEBI:58045 |
| ChemSpider | 6067 |
| DrugBank | DB00167 |
| ECHA InfoCard | 100.000.726 |
| IUPHAR/BPS | 3311 |
| KEGG | D00065 |
| PubChem CID | 791 |
| UNII | 04Y7590D77 |
| CompTox Dashboard (EPA) | DTXSID501096647 DTXSID1047441, DTXSID501096647 |
- InChI: InChI=1S/C6H13NO2/c1-3-4(2)5(7)6(8)9/h4-5H,3,7H2,1-2H3,(H,8,9)/t4-,5-/m0/s1 Key: AGPKZVBTJJNPAG-WHFBIAKZSA-N; InChI=1/C6H13NO2/c1-3-4(2)5(7)6(8)9/h4-5H,3,7H2,1-2H3,(H,8,9)/t4-,5-/m0/s1 Key: AGPKZVBTJJNPAG-WHFBIAKZBB
- SMILES: CC[C@H](C)[C@@H](C(=O)O)N; Zwitterion: CC[C@H](C)[C@@H](C(=O)[O-])[NH3+]

Properties
| Chemical formula | C_{6}H_{13}NO_{2} |
| Molar mass | 131.175 g·mol^{−1} |
| Magnetic susceptibility (χ) | −84.9·10^{−6} cm^{3}/mol |

Supplementary data page
- Isoleucine (data page)
- Except where otherwise noted, data are given for materials in their standard state (at 25 °C [77 °F], 100 kPa). verify (what is ?) Infobox references

Isoleucine ball and stick model spinning

Isoleucine (symbol Ile or I) is an α-amino acid that is used in the biosynthesis of proteins. It contains an α-amino group (which is in the protonated −NH^{+}_{3} form under biological conditions), an α-carboxylic acid group (which is in the deprotonated −COO^{−} form under biological conditions), and a hydrocarbon side chain with a branch (a central carbon atom bound to three other carbon atoms). It is classified as a non-polar, uncharged (at physiological pH), branched-chain, aliphatic amino acid. It is essential in humans, meaning the body cannot synthesize it. Essential amino acids are necessary in the human diet. In plants isoleucine can be synthesized from threonine and methionine. In plants and bacteria, isoleucine is synthesized from a pyruvate employing leucine biosynthesis enzymes. It is encoded by the codons AUU, AUC, and AUA.

== Metabolism ==
=== Biosynthesis ===
In plants and microorganisms, isoleucine is synthesized from pyruvate and alpha-ketobutyrate. This pathway is not present in humans. Enzymes involved in this biosynthesis include:

1. Acetolactate synthase (also known as acetohydroxy acid synthase)
2. Acetohydroxy acid isomeroreductase
3. Dihydroxyacid dehydratase
4. Valine aminotransferase

=== Catabolism ===
Isoleucine is both a glucogenic and a ketogenic amino acid. After transamination with alpha-ketoglutarate, the carbon skeleton is oxidised and split into propionyl-CoA and acetyl-CoA. Propionyl-CoA is converted into succinyl-CoA, a TCA cycle intermediate which can be converted into oxaloacetate for gluconeogenesis (hence glucogenic). In mammals acetyl-CoA cannot be converted to carbohydrate but can be either fed into the TCA cycle by condensing with oxaloacetate to form citrate or used in the synthesis of ketone bodies (hence ketogenic) or fatty acids.

=== Metabolic diseases ===
The degradation of isoleucine is impaired in the following metabolic diseases:

- Combined malonic and methylmalonic aciduria (CMAMMA)
- Maple syrup urine disease (MSUD)
- Methylmalonic acidemia
- Propionic acidemia

=== Insulin resistance ===
Isoleucine, like other branched-chain amino acids, is associated with insulin resistance: higher levels of isoleucine are observed in the blood of diabetic mice, rats, and humans. In diet-induced obese and insulin resistant mice, a diet with decreased levels of isoleucine (with or without the other branched-chain amino acids) results in reduced adiposity and improved insulin sensitivity. Reduced dietary levels of isoleucine are required for the beneficial metabolic effects of a low protein diet. In humans, a protein restricted diet lowers blood levels of isoleucine and decreases fasting blood glucose levels. Mice fed a low isoleucine diet are leaner, live longer, and are less frail. In humans, higher dietary levels of isoleucine are associated with greater body mass index.

== Functions and requirement ==
The Food and Nutrition Board (FNB) of the U.S. Institute of Medicine has set Recommended Dietary Allowances (RDAs) for essential amino acids in 2002. For adults 19 years and older, 19 mg of isoleucine/kg body weight is required daily.

Beside its biological role as a nutrient, isoleucine also participates in regulation of glucose metabolism. Isoleucine is an essential component of many proteins. As an essential amino acid, isoleucine must be ingested or protein production in the cell will be disrupted. Fetal hemoglobin is one of the many proteins that require isoleucine. Isoleucine is present in the gamma chain of fetal hemoglobin and must be present for the protein to form.

Genetic diseases can change the consumption requirements of isoleucine. Amino acids cannot be stored in the body. Buildup of excess amino acids will cause a buildup of toxic molecules so, humans have many pathways to degrade each amino acid when the need for protein synthesis has been met. Mutations in isoleucine-degrading enzymes can lead to dangerous buildup of isoleucine and its toxic derivative. One example is maple syrup urine disease (MSUD), a disorder that leaves people unable to breakdown isoleucine, valine, and leucine. People with MSUD manage their disease by a reduced intake of all three of those amino acids alongside drugs that help excrete built-up toxins.

Many animals and plants are dietary sources of isoleucine as a component of proteins. Foods that have high amounts of isoleucine include eggs, soy protein, seaweed, turkey, chicken, lamb, cheese, and fish.

== Synthesis ==
Routes to isoleucine are numerous. One common multistep procedure starts from 2-bromobutane and diethylmalonate. Synthetic isoleucine was first reported in 1905 by French chemists Bouveault and Locquin.

== Discovery ==
German chemist Felix Ehrlich discovered isoleucine while studying the composition of beet-sugar molasses 1903. In 1907 Ehrlich carried out further studies on fibrin, egg albumin, gluten, and beef muscle in 1907. These studies verified the natural composition of isoleucine. Ehrlich published his own synthesis of isoleucine in 1908.

== See also ==
- Alloisoleucine, the diasteromer of isoleucine
- Low Isoleucine protein foods
