= Valine—3-methyl-2-oxovalerate transaminase =

Valine-3-methyl-2-oxovalerate transaminase

Identifiers
- EC no.: 2.6.1.32
- CAS no.: 9023-14-7

Databases
- IntEnz: IntEnz view
- BRENDA: BRENDA entry
- ExPASy: NiceZyme view
- KEGG: KEGG entry
- MetaCyc: metabolic pathway
- PRIAM: profile
- PDB structures: RCSB PDB PDBe PDBsum
- Gene Ontology: AmiGO / QuickGO
Search
- PMC: articles
- PubMed: articles
- NCBI: proteins

Valine-3-methyl-2-oxovalerate transaminase (EC 2.6.1.32) is an enzyme that catalyzes the chemical reaction

valine
+
3(S)-3-methyl-2-oxo-pentanoic acid
α-ketoisovaleric acid
+
isoleucine

The two substrates of this enzyme characterised from pea are L-valine and 3(S)-3-methyl-2-oxo-pentanoic acid. Its products are α-ketoisovaleric acid and L-isoleucine.

This enzyme is a transferase, specifically a transaminase, which transfer nitrogenous groups. The systematic name of this enzyme class is L-valine:(S)-3-methyl-2-oxopentanoate aminotransferase. Other names in common use include valine-isoleucine transaminase, valine-3-methyl-2-oxovalerate aminotransferase, alanine-valine transaminase, valine-2-keto-methylvalerate aminotransferase, and valine-isoleucine aminotransferase.
