= Nareline =

Chemical compound

Names
- IUPAC name methyl (10R,12R,13E,17S,19R)-13-ethylidene-17-hydroxy-16-oxa-8,15-diazahexacyclo[10.6.1.0^{1,9}.0^{2,7}.0^{10,15}.0^{14,18}]nonadeca-2,4,6,8-tetraene-19-carboxylate

Identifiers
CAS Number	63950-46-9
3D model (JSmol)	Interactive image
ChemSpider	4947569
PubChem CID	6443592
- InChI: InChI=1S/C20H20N2O4/c1-3-9-10-8-13-17-20(14(10)18(23)25-2,11-6-4-5-7-12(11)21-17)15-16(9)22(13)26-19(15)24/h3-7,10,13-16,19,24H,8H2,1-2H3/b9-3+/t10-,13+,14-,15?,16?,19-,20?/m0/s1 Key: RTKCXWGAPBPXSB-WQEJXPQFSA-N
- SMILES: C/C=C/1\[C@@H]2C[C@@H]3C4=NC5=CC=CC=C5C4([C@@H]2C(=O)OC)C6C1N3O[C@@H]6O

Properties
Chemical formula	C_{20}H_{20}N_{2}O_{4}
Molar mass	352.390 g·mol^{−1}
- Except where otherwise noted, data are given for materials in their standard state (at 25 °C [77 °F], 100 kPa). Infobox references

Nareline is a bio-active alkaloid isolated from Alstonia boonei, a medicinal tree of West Africa.

== Notes ==
- A Review of the Ethnobotany and Pharmacological Importance of Alstonia boonei De Wild (Apocynaceae)
