= 2-isopropylmalate synthase =

InterPro Family

Identifiers
- EC no.: 2.3.3.13
- CAS no.: 9030-98-2

Databases
- IntEnz: IntEnz view
- BRENDA: BRENDA entry
- ExPASy: NiceZyme view
- KEGG: KEGG entry
- MetaCyc: metabolic pathway
- PRIAM: profile
- PDB structures: RCSB PDB PDBe PDBsum
- Gene Ontology: AmiGO / QuickGO
Search
- PMC: articles
- PubMed: articles
- NCBI: proteins

2-isopropylmalate synthase (EC 2.3.3.13) is an enzyme that catalyzes the chemical reaction

α-Ketoisovaleric acid
Acetyl-CoA
H_{2}O
(S)-2-isopropylmalic acid
+ Coenzyme A

The three substrates of this enzyme are α-ketoisovaleric acid, acetyl-CoA, and water. Its products are the (S) enantiomer of 2-isopropylmalic acid and coenzyme A.

The enzyme belongs to the family of transferases, specifically those acyltransferases that convert acyl groups into alkyl groups on transfer. The systematic name of this enzyme class is acetyl-CoA:3-methyl-2-oxobutanoate C-acetyltransferase (thioester-hydrolysing, carboxymethyl-forming). Other names in common use include 3-carboxy-3-hydroxy-4-methylpentanoate 3-methyl-2-oxobutanoate-lyase, (CoA-acetylating), alpha-isopropylmalate synthetase, alpha-isopropylmalate synthase, alpha-isopropylmalic synthetase, isopropylmalate synthase, and isopropylmalate synthetase. This enzyme participates in biosynthesis of L-leucine and pyruvate metabolism. Monovalent and divalent cation activation have been reported for enzymes from different sources.

Mycobacterium tuberculosis α-isopropylmalate synthase requires a divalent metal ion, of which Mg^{2+} and Mn^{2+} give highest activity, and a monovalent cation, with K^{+} as the best activator. Zn^{2+} was shown to be an inhibitor, contrary to what was assumed from the structural data. Another feature of the M. tuberculosis homolog is that L-leucine, the feedback inhibitor, inhibits the enzyme in a time-dependent fashion. This was the first demonstration of a feedback inhibitor that displays slow-onset inhibition.

== Tertiary structure ==
As of late 2007, only one tertiary structure has been solved for this class of enzymes, with the Protein Data Bank accession code 1SR9.
