= Phosphoribosyl-ATP diphosphatase =

Class of enzymes

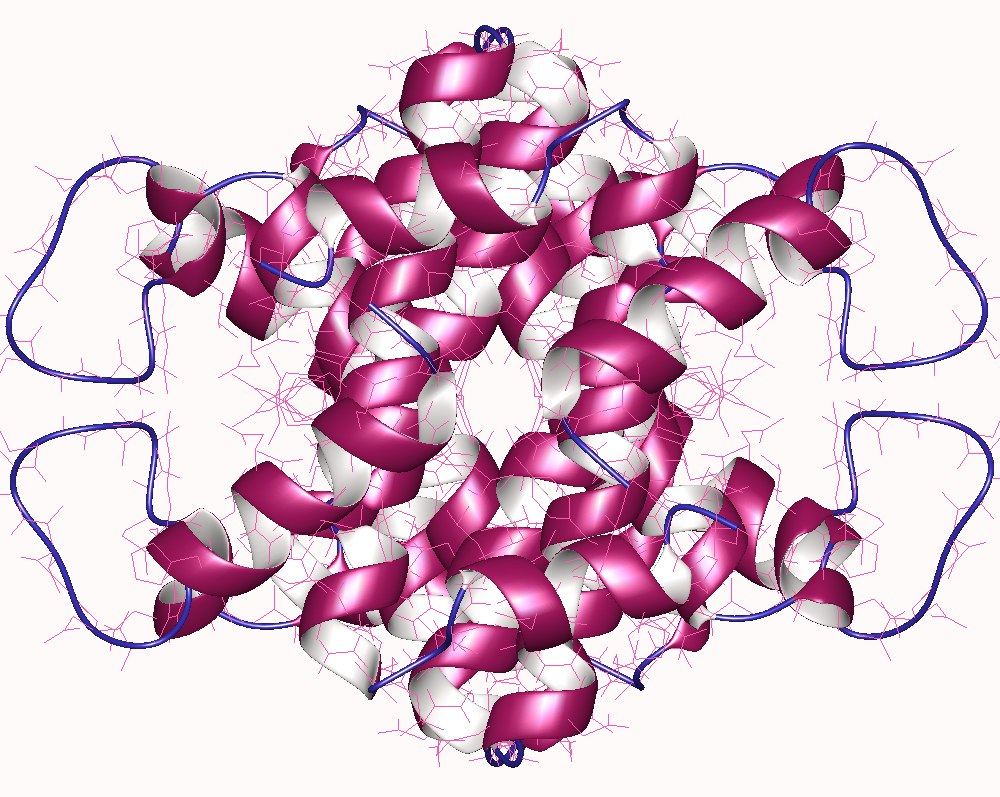
- phosphoribosyl-ATP pyrophosphatase tetramer, Streptomyces coelicolor

Identifiers
- EC no.: 3.6.1.31
- CAS no.: 69553-55-5

Databases
- BRENDA: enzyme data
- ExPASy: NiceZyme view
- KEGG: enzyme entry
- MetaCyc: metabolic pathway
- Rhea: reactions
- PDB structures: RCSB PDB PDBe PDBsum
- Gene Ontology: AmiGO / QuickGO
Search
- PMC: articles
- PubMed: articles
- NCBI: proteins

Phosphoribosyl-ATP diphosphatase (EC 3.6.1.31) is an enzyme characterised from Salmonella typhimurium that catalyzes the hydrolysis of 1-(5-phospho-β-D-ribosyl)-ATP, a derivative of adenosine triphosphate (ATP), to its monophosphate, 1-(5-phospho-β-D-ribosyl)-AMP, and pyrophosphate (PP_{i}):

1-(5-phospho-β-D-ribosyl)-ATP
H_{2}O
PP_{i}
1-(5-phospho-β-D-ribosyl)-AMP

In actinobacteria including Mycobacterium tuberculosis and in most archaea, this is the second step of histidine biosynthesis, and is followed by one catalysed by phosphoribosyl-AMP cyclohydrolase. In most bacteria, including Acinetobacter baumannii these two reactions are carried out by a bifunctional protein that combines their activity. In Neurospora crassa, the enzyme also catalyses a later step in the pathway to histidine.

== Nomenclature ==
This enzyme is a hydrolase, specifically one acting on acid anhydrides in phosphorus-containing anhydrides. The systematic name of this enzyme class is 1-(5-phosphoribosyl)-ATP diphosphohydrolase. Other names in common use include phosphoribosyl-ATP pyrophosphatase, and phosphoribosyladenosine triphosphate pyrophosphatase.
