= Threonine synthase =

Class of enzymes

threonine synthase
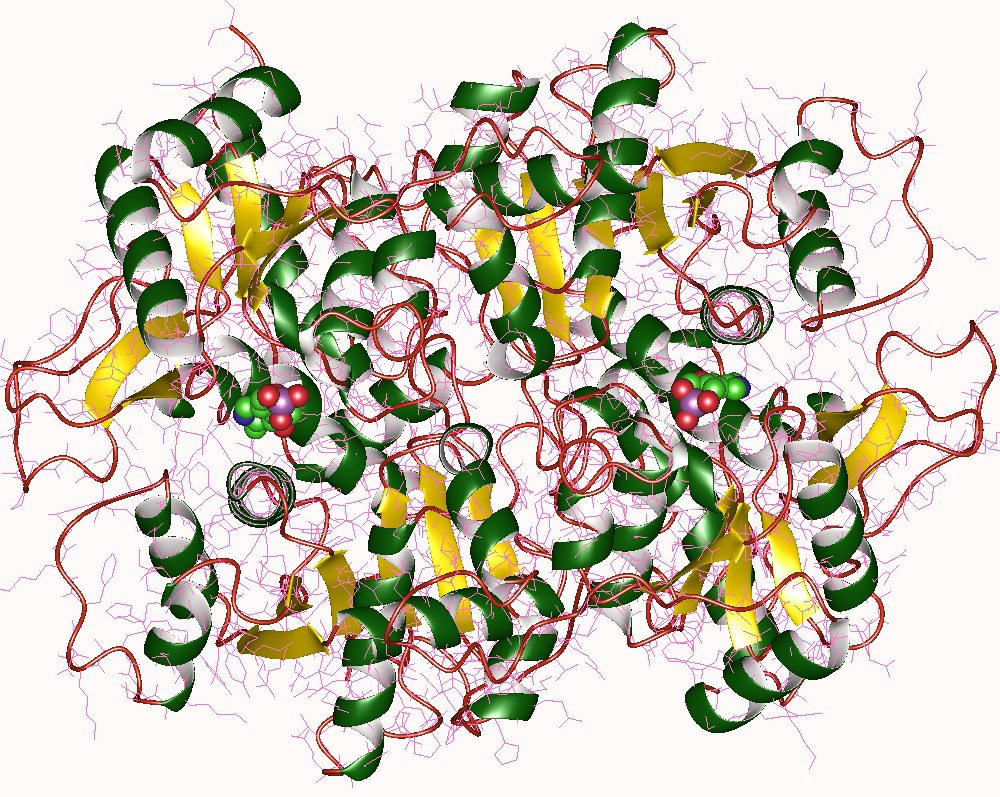
- threonine synthase dimer, Arabidopsis thaliana

Identifiers
- EC no.: 4.2.3.1
- CAS no.: 9023-97-6

Databases
- IntEnz: IntEnz view
- BRENDA: BRENDA entry
- ExPASy: NiceZyme view
- KEGG: KEGG entry
- MetaCyc: metabolic pathway
- PRIAM: profile
- PDB structures: RCSB PDB PDBe PDBsum
- Gene Ontology: AmiGO / QuickGO
Search
- PMC: articles
- PubMed: articles
- NCBI: proteins

The enzyme threonine synthase (EC 4.2.3.1) catalyzes the chemical reaction

O-phospho-L-homoserine + H_{2}O $\rightleftharpoons$ L-threonine + phosphate

This enzyme belongs to the family of lyases, specifically those carbon-oxygen lyases acting on phosphates. The systematic name of this enzyme class is O-phospho-L-homoserine phosphate-lyase (adding water L-threonine-forming). Other names in common use include threonine synthetase, and O-phospho-L-homoserine phospho-lyase (adding water). This enzyme participates in glycine, serine and threonine metabolism, and vitamin B_{6} metabolism. It employs one cofactor, pyridoxal phosphate.

== Structural studies ==
As of late 2007, 7 structures have been solved for this class of enzymes, with PDB accession codes 1UIM, 1UIN, 1V7C, 1VB3, 2C2B, 2C2G, and 2D1F.
