= Asparagine synthetase =

Mammalian protein found in Homo sapiens

asparagine synthetase
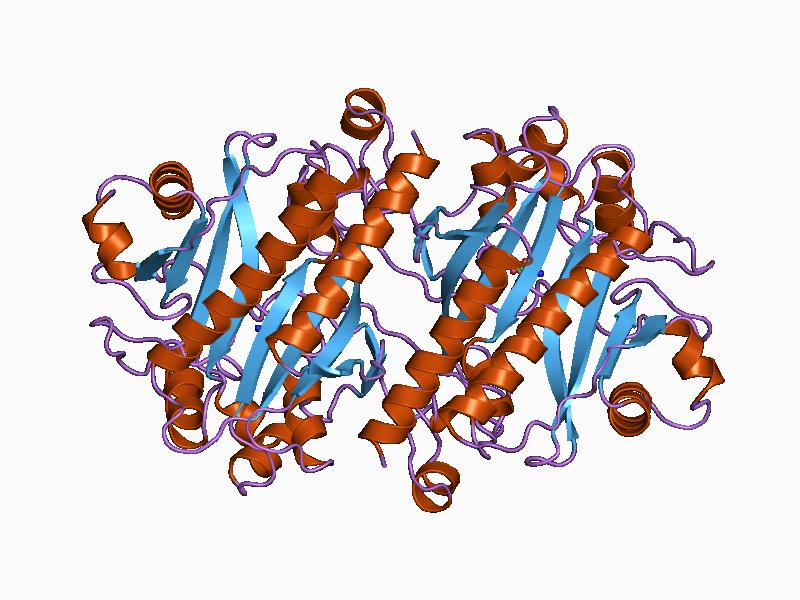

Identifiers
- Symbol: ASNS
- Alt. symbols: 11as, AsnS
- NCBI gene: 440
- HGNC: 753
- OMIM: 108370
- RefSeq: NM_001673
- UniProt: P08243

Other data
- EC number: 6.3.5.4
- Locus: Chr. 7 q21-q31
Search for
- Structures: Swiss-model
- Domains: InterPro

Asparagine synthetase (or aspartate-ammonia ligase) is a chiefly cytoplasmic enzyme that generates asparagine from aspartate. This amidation reaction is similar to that promoted by glutamine synthetase. The enzyme is ubiquitous in its distribution in mammalian organs, but basal expression is relatively low in tissues other than the exocrine pancreas.

Above average presence of asparagine synthetase in certain leukemia strains has been linked to be a significant contributing factor of chemotherapy resistance, particularly to the chemotherapy drug, L-asparaginase.

== Structure ==
Escherichia coli derived asparagine synthetase is a dimeric protein with each subunit folding into two distinct domains. The N-terminal region consists of two layers of six-stranded antiparallel β-sheets between which is the active site responsible for the hydrolysis of glutamine. The C-terminal domain consists of a five-stranded parallel β-sheet flanked on either side by α-helices. This domain is responsible for the binding of both Mg^{2+}ATP and aspartate. These two active sites are connected by a tunnel lined primarily with backbone atoms and hydrophobic, nonpolar amino acid residues.

Structural characterization of asparagine synthetase from mammalian sources have been difficult due to the low abundance and instability of the enzyme during purification procedures.

== Mechanism ==
Using information from Escherichia coli derived asparagine synthetase, some basic mechanisms of the enzyme have been understood. The N-terminal active site catalyzes glutamine hydrolysis to yield glutamate and ammonia. The C-terminal active site catalyzes activation of the side-chain carboxylate of aspartate to form an electrophilic intermediate, β-aspartyl-AMP (βAspAMP) 1, and inorganic pyrophosphate (PPi). The tunnel that links the two active sites allows for the passage of an ammonia molecule to act as a common intermediate to couple the two half-reactions carried out in the independent active sites of the enzyme. Thus, after being released in, and channeled from, the glutaminase site, the ammonia molecule attacks the bound βAspAMP 1 to give asparagine and AMP via a tetrahedral intermediate.

== Function ==
In plants, inorganic nitrogen is taken up from the environment in forms of nitrate or ammonium. Assimilation of this nitrogen into asparagine for use in nitrogen recycling, transport, and storage is an essential process for plant development, making asparagine synthetase vital to maintaining these asparagine reserves. Specific events in development which depend on asparagine synthetase are nitrogen mobilization in germinating seeds, nitrogen recycling and flow in vegetative cells in response to biotic and abiotic stresses, and nitrogen remobilization from source to sink organs.

In mammals, asparagine synthetase expression has been found to be linked to cell growth, and its mRNA content is linked to changes in the cell cycle. Hamster BHK ts11 cells produce an inactive asparagine synthetase enzyme, and this loss of asparagine synthetase activity directly led to cell cycle arrest in the cells as a consequence of a depletion of cellular asparagine. Upregulation of asparagine synthetase mRNA was observed as well in these hamster cells. Other experiments demonstrated that quiescent rat thyroid cells entering S phase as a result of thyroid-stimulating hormone treatment was matched with a concurrent increase in asparagine synthetase mRNA content.

== Classes ==
There seem to be two major groups of asparagine synthetase:

- Majority of prokaryotic isolated enzymes (asnA) utilize ammonia as the sole nitrogen source.
- Eukaryotic isolated and some prokaryotic isolated enzymes (asnB) utilize glutamine as the preferred nitrogen source, although these enzymes can also employ ammonia as an alternate substrate. The human glutamine-dependent AS is encoded by a single gene located in region q21.3 on chromosome 7. The lack of ammonia-dependent asparagine synthetase in eukaryotes is presumably because of the need to maintain cellular concentrations of ammonia at very low levels.

== Clinical significance ==
=== Cancer ===
==== Leukemia ====
Cancerous cells exhibit rapid growth and cell division and subsequently have an increased nutritional need. The particularly low-level expression of asparagine synthetase in primary acute lymphoblastic leukemia (ALL) and numerous ALL cell lines, as compared to that of normal cells, makes asparagine depletion an effective method of treatment due to the cells' unusual dependency on circulating serum asparagine as a necessary nutrition for growth. As a result, L-asparaginase is a common chemotherapy drug utilized in the treatment of ALL and may have applications in other asparagine synthetase negative cancers, such as lymphomas, due to its aspariginase activity to deplete serum asparagine. This depletion of serum asparagine leads to a subsequent rapid efflux of cellular asparagine, which is immediately acted upon and destroyed by the L-asparaginase as well. Due to the transient response from these susceptible cancers in reaction to the asparagine depletion, tumor growth is significantly inhibited due to nutritional deficiency.

Most somatic cells express sufficient basal amounts of asparagine synthetase to counteract this asparagine starvation and survive the effects of L-asparaginase. In addition, these normal cells are able to upregulate their expression of asparagine synthetase in response to the asparagine depletion, further countering some of the toxic effects of the medication on normal cell activity, a desirable trait for chemotherapy drugs.

However, the opposite effect is visible in cases of asparaginase resistant cancers. In these resistant cancers, the effect of blood asparagine depletion through L-asparaginase instead leads to significant asparagine synthetase overexpression to compensate, effectively nullifying the effect of the chemotherapy drug. For example, in mouse models, 24 hours after exposure to L-asparaginase, tumors resistant to the depletion responded with 5- to 19-fold increases in asparagine synthetase expression. These resistant tumors also inherently express higher levels of asparagine synthetase activity, even without the application of L-asparaginase to drive further expression. Similar trends are often seen in human studies as well, with high levels of asparagine synthetase activity being detected in asparaginase-resistant cases of treatment as compared with the negligible activity of susceptible cases. As seen in in vitro studies of resistant human leukemia cell lines, even six weeks after the removal of asparagine depleting factors, the increased level of expression of asparagine synthetase failed to return to a basal state, instead remaining elevated and retaining continued drug resistance.

While the mechanisms underlying the sustained over-expression of ASNS have not been reported in these studies, transcriptome profiling of two T-ALL patients that have relapsed after L-asparaginase treatment revealed a recurrent promoter swap with KMT2E leading to ASNS over-expression and L-asparaginase resistance. It has been further demonstrated in mouse model systems that repeated subculturing of L-asparaginase sensitive tumor cells in sublethal concentrations of L-asparaginase could eventually make them resistant, a potential worry of lower dose chemotherapy treatments effectively encouraging resistant cell development.

==== Potential biomarker for ovarian cancer ====
A correlation between L-asparaginase efficacy and asparagine synthetase protein levels in a number of human ovarian cell lines has been observed. As mentioned above, this result confirmed similar observations in human leukemia cell lines. Hence asparagine synthetase might be used as a biomarker in ovarian cancer screening and potential treatment.

==== Potential role in solid tumor metastasis ====
An epithelial to mesenchymal transition was mimicked in metastatic cells by adapting PC-3 prostate cancer cells from adherent to suspension culture and then examined to investigate changes in gene expression concurrent with this adaption to suspension. It was found that the asparagine synthetase expression was sixfold greater in the suspension cells than in the adherent cells. In xenografts from a human breast cancer cell line in an established metastatic mouse model, asparagine synthetase was elevated in circulating tumor cells isolated from the mouse blood compared with the parental cell line. When these circulating tumor cells were returned to an in vitro culture and exposed to hypoxia, they showed higher basal expression and greater induction of asparagine synthetase than their parental cell line. These circulating tumor cells were also found to have an increased capacity for colony formation in soft agar assays under hypoxic conditions and grew faster when reimplanted as xenografts. The increased prevalence of asparaginase synthetase in the metastatic cells suggests that its activity may be beneficial for circulating tumor cell survival.

== Trivia ==
Guinea pigs have some of the highest levels of naturally expressing asparagine synthetase due to the fact that their serum inherently containing detectable levels of L-asparaginase.
