= Anthranilate phosphoribosyltransferase =

InterPro Family

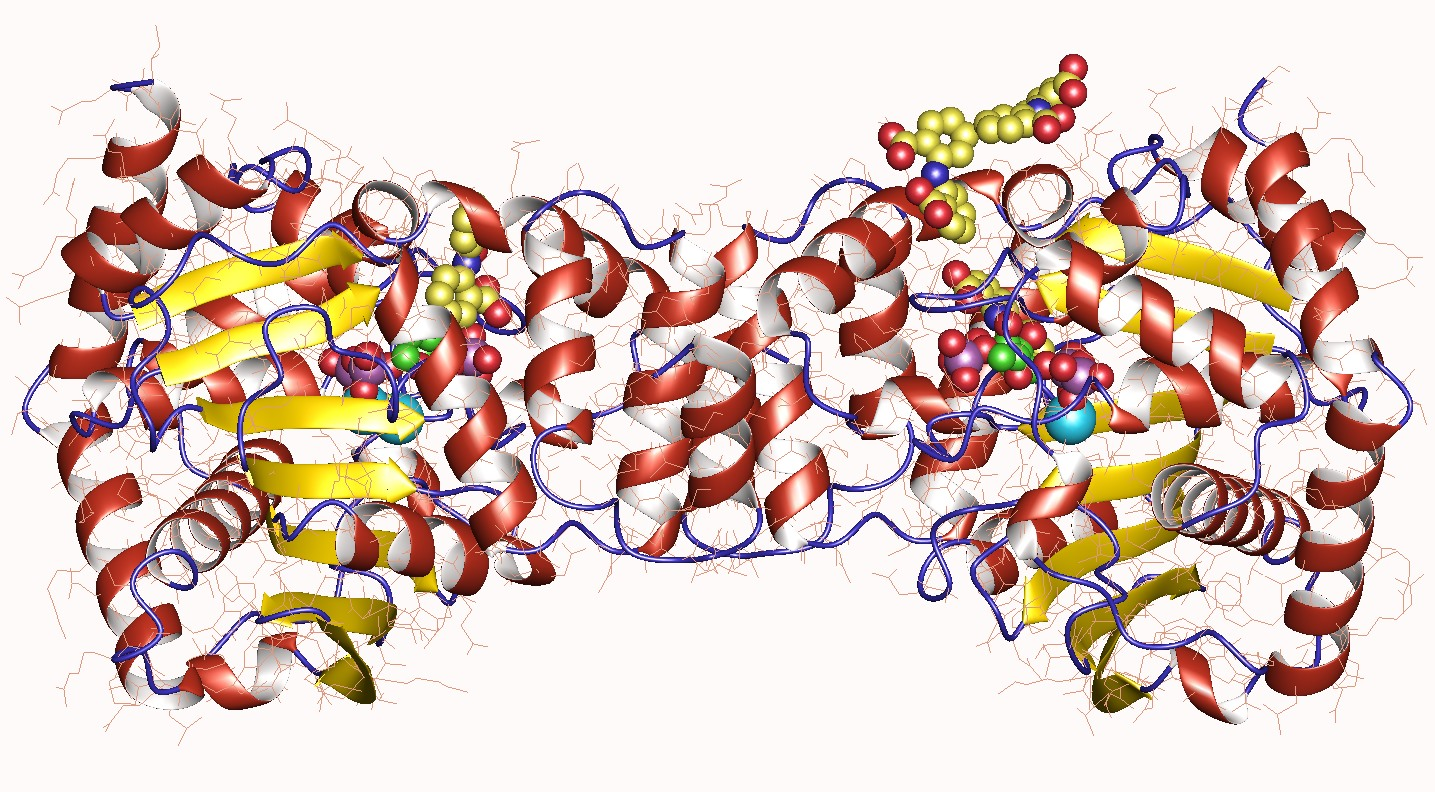
- Anthranilate phosphoribosyltransferase homodimer, Mycobacterium tuberculosis

Identifiers
- EC no.: 2.4.2.18
- CAS no.: 9059-35-2

Databases
- IntEnz: IntEnz view
- BRENDA: BRENDA entry
- ExPASy: NiceZyme view
- KEGG: KEGG entry
- MetaCyc: metabolic pathway
- PRIAM: profile
- PDB structures: RCSB PDB PDBe PDBsum
- Gene Ontology: AmiGO / QuickGO
Search
- PMC: articles
- PubMed: articles
- NCBI: proteins

Anthranilate phosphoribosyltransferase (EC 2.4.2.18) is an enzyme that catalyzes the chemical reaction:

anthranilic acid + phosphoribosyl pyrophosphate $\rightleftharpoons$ N-(5-phospho-β-D-ribosyl)anthranilic acid + diphosphate

This reaction is part of the biosynthesis pathway to tryptophan.

== Nomenclature ==
Anthranilate phosphoribosyltransferase is a glycosyltransferase, specifically a pentosyltransferase. The systematic name of this enzyme class is N-(5-phospho-D-ribosyl)-anthranilate:diphosphate phospho-alpha-D-ribosyltransferase. Other names in common use are:

- anthranilate 5-phosphoribosylpyrophosphate
- anthranilate phosphoribosylpyrophosphate phosphoribosyltransferase
- anthranilate-PP-ribose-P phosphoribosyltransferase
- phosphoribosyl-anthranilate pyrophosphorylase
- phosphoribosylanthranilate pyrophosphorylase
- phosphoribosylanthranilate transferase
- phosphoribosyltransferase
- PRT

== Function ==
Anthranilate phosphoribosyltransferase (AnPRT) is a transferase enzyme which catalyses the attachment of a phosphoribose group to the amine of anthranilic acid. It uses phosphoribosyl pyrophosphate to provide the sugar component and gives pyrophosphate (PP_{i}) as a byproduct.

The reaction is part of the biosynthetic pathway to the amino acid, tryptophan. At the active site of the enzyme, anthranilic acid and phosphoribosyl pyrophosphate react by an SN1 mechanism.

phosphoribosyl pyrophosphate
+
anthranilic acid
PP_{i}
PP_{i}
N-(5-phospho-β-D-ribosyl)anthranilic acid

== Structure ==
As of late 2007, 12 structures have been solved for this class of enzymes, with PDB accession codes PDB: 1GXB, PDB: 1KGZ, PDB: 1KHD, PDB: 1O17, PDB: 1V8G, PDB: 1VQU, PDB: 1ZVW, PDB: 1ZXY, PDB: 1ZYK, PDB: 2BPQ, PDB: 2ELC, and PDB: 2GVQ.

AnPRT has four domains and its quaternary structure consists of two identical protein structures. Each domain of AnPRT contains a magnesium ion and a pyrophosphate molecule as the active site. The secondary structure of AnPRT consists mainly of alpha helices with a beta sheet within each domain.

== Homologues ==
There are homologues of AnPRT within Saccharomyces cerevisiae, Kluyveromyces lactis, Schizosaccharomyces pombe, Magnaporthe grisea, Neurospora crassa, Arabidopsis thaliana, and Oryza sativa. All of these organisms are alike in the sense that they make all of the amino acids needed for proper protein formation (also called autotrophs).

AnPRT is vital in these organisms because it is a step in the pathway to tryptophan, an essential amino acid in humans, which humans take from eating plants or fungi.

== Mutations in AnPRT ==
(This entire section comes from the paper written by Dr. Robert Last and his collaborators, referenced here:)

An experiment was conducted on the varying mutations in the gene which codes for AnPRT in Arabidopsis. This study focused on the observed fluorescence of Arabidopsis plants when the gene which coded for AnPRT was mutated. It was found that there were nine mutations of the gene all with varying auxotrophic and prototrophic capabilities.

It was discovered that there was an increased level of anthranilate in the cells of Arabidopsis which were mutated. This was concluded to be linked to the fluorescence of the plants.

This study's relevance comes from the applications of the conclusions found by the scientists. The auxotrophic mutant could be used as a selectable marker in plant transformations. This can lead to a better way to engineer plants and find new ways to develop their systems to work for humanities purposes.
