= Anthranilate synthase =

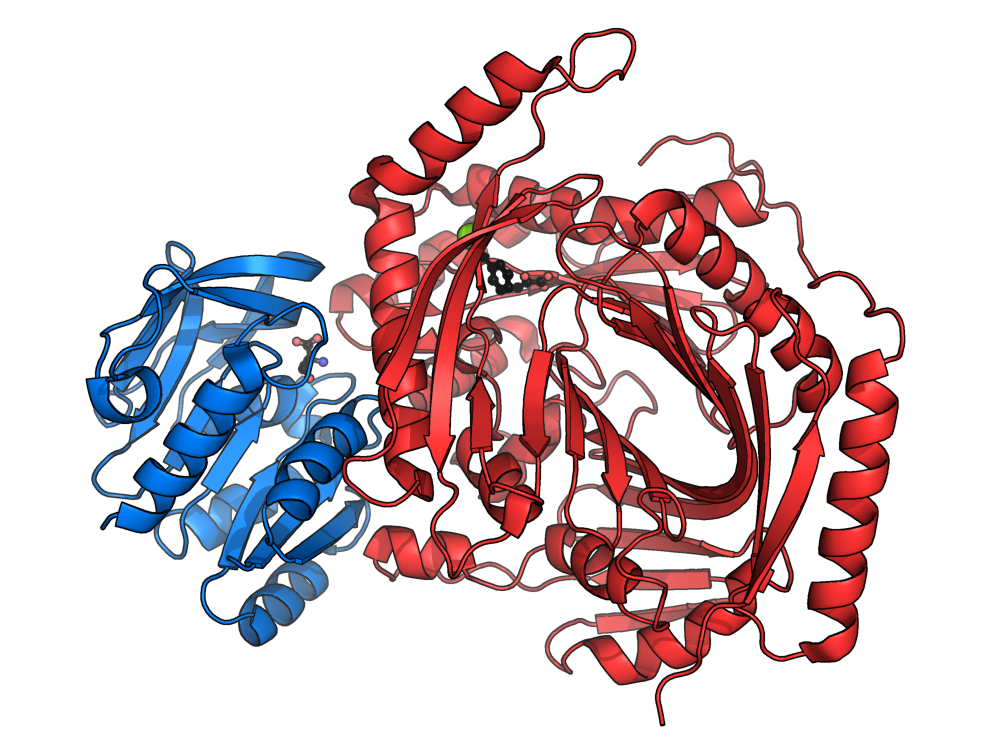
- Serratia marcescens anthranilate synthase dimer complex with TrpE (red) and TrpG (blue). PDB: 1I7Q

Identifiers
- EC no.: 4.1.3.27
- CAS no.: 9031-59-8

Databases
- BRENDA: enzyme data
- ExPASy: NiceZyme view
- KEGG: enzyme entry
- MetaCyc: metabolic pathway
- Rhea: reactions
- PDB structures: RCSB PDB PDBe PDBsum
- Gene Ontology: AmiGO / QuickGO
Search
- PMC: articles
- PubMed: articles
- NCBI: proteins

The enzyme anthranilate synthase (EC 4.1.3.27) catalyzes the chemical reaction

chorismate + L-glutamine $\rightleftharpoons$ anthranilate + pyruvate + L-glutamate

== Function ==
Anthranilate synthase creates anthranilate, an important intermediate in the biosynthesis of indole, and by extension, the amino acid tryptophan. Tryptophan can then be metabolized further into serotonin, melatonin, or various auxins.

== Reaction ==
Anthranilate synthase catalyzes the change from chorismate to anthranilate. As its other substrate, it can use either glutamine or ammonia. During the reaction, both a hydroxyl group and an enolpyruvyl group are removed from the aromatic ring. The enolpyruvyl group gains a proton to form pyruvate. The proton comes from the surrounding water and not from an intramolecular shift of a hydrogen atom on the substrates. The amino group of glutamine (or ammonia itself) attacks chorismate in position 2, which leads to the elimination of enolpyruvyl group from position 3. In the process, an aromatic ring is re-formed.

Chemical equation of reaction occurring in anthranilate synthase

== Structure and assembly ==
The complex is made up of α and β subunits. Gel filtration experiments reveal that the complex occurs as an α_{2}β_{2} tetramer under native conditions, and as an αβ dimer under high salt concentrations. The αβ dimers interact through the α subunits to form the complex.

The subunits of anthranilate synthase are encoded by the trpE and trpD genes in E. coli, both of which appear in the trp operon.

In Enterobacteriaceae, this enzyme exists in the form of an aggregate with anthranilate phosphoribosyltransferase. If these two enzymes are not clustered, the complex is unable to use glutamine as a substrate and can only use ammonia.

== Nomenclature ==
This enzyme belongs to the family of lyases, to be specific the oxo-acid-lyases, which cleave carbon-carbon bonds. The systematic name of this enzyme class is chorismate pyruvate-lyase (amino-accepting; anthranilate-forming). Other names in common use include anthranilate synthetase, chorismate lyase, and chorismate pyruvate-lyase (amino-accepting). This enzyme participates in phenylalanine, tyrosine and tryptophan biosynthesis and two-component system - general.

== Structural studies ==
As of late 2007, five structures have been solved for this class of enzymes, with PDB accession codes PDB: 1I1Q, PDB: 1I7Q, PDB: 1I7S, PDB: 1QDL, and PDB: 2I6Y.
