= Phosphoribosyl-AMP cyclohydrolase =

Class of enzymes

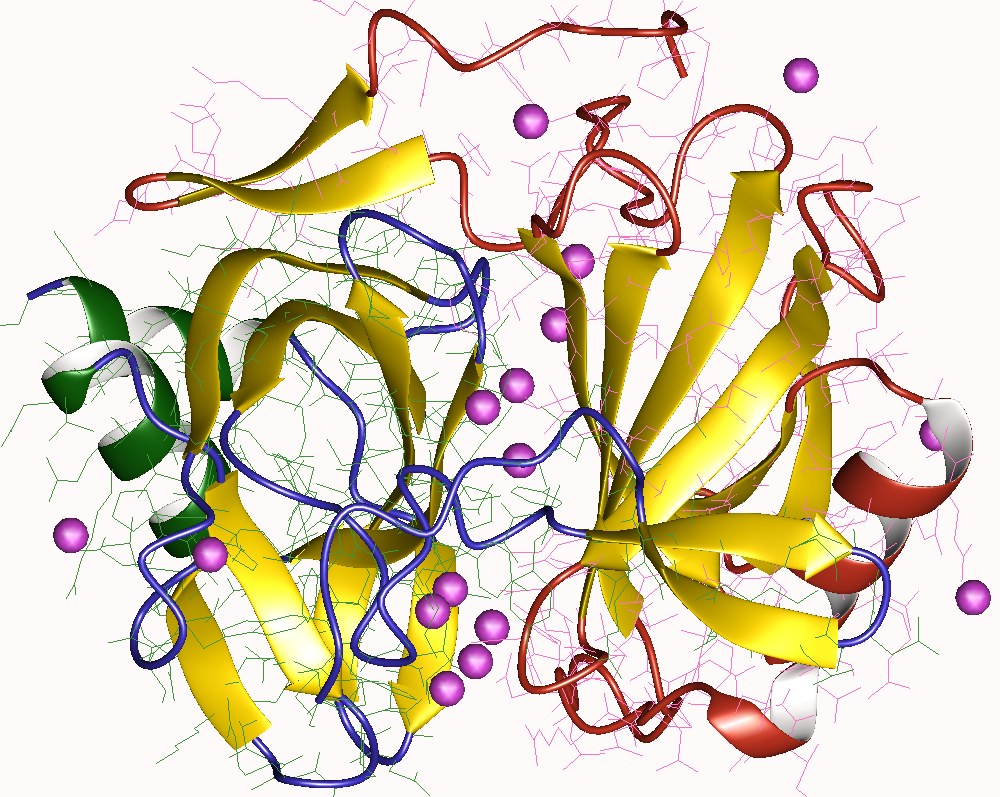
- Phosphoribosyl-AMP cyclohydrolase dimer, Methanobacterium

Identifiers
- EC no.: 3.5.4.19
- CAS no.: 37289-22-8

Databases
- BRENDA: enzyme data
- ExPASy: NiceZyme view
- KEGG: enzyme entry
- MetaCyc: metabolic pathway
- Rhea: reactions
- PDB structures: RCSB PDB PDBe PDBsum
- Gene Ontology: AmiGO / QuickGO
Search
- PMC: articles
- PubMed: articles
- NCBI: proteins

Phosphoribosyl-AMP cyclohydrolase (EC 3.5.4.19) is an enzyme characterised from Neurospora crassa that catalyzes the hydrolysis of 1-(5-phospho-β-D-ribosyl)-5'-AMP, a derivative of adenosine monophosphate (AMP), to 1-(5-phosphoribosyl)-5-[(5-phosphoribosylamino)methylideneamino]imidazole-4-carboxamide (1):

1-(5-phospho-β-D-ribosyl)-5'-AMP
H_{2}O
(1)

In actinobacteria including Mycobacterium tuberculosis and in most archaea, this is the third step of histidine biosynthesis, following one catalysed by phosphoribosyl-ATP diphosphatase, which produces the starting material from its triphosphate derivative equivalent to adenosine triphosphate. In most bacteria, including Acinetobacter baumannii these two reactions are carried out by a bifunctional protein that combines their activity. The Neurospora crassa enzyme also catalyses a later step in the pathway to histidine.

This enzyme is a hydrolase, one acting on carbon-nitrogen bonds other than peptide bonds, specifically in cyclic amidines. The systematic name of this enzyme class is 1-(5-phospho-D-ribosyl)-AMP 1,6-hydrolase. Other names in common use include PRAMP-cyclohydrolase, and phosphoribosyladenosine monophosphate cyclohydrolase.

== Structural studies ==
As of late 2007, only one structure has been solved for this class of enzymes, with the PDB accession code PDB: 1ZPS.
