= Nucleotide =

Biological molecules constituting nucleic acids

This nucleotide contains the five-carbon sugar deoxyribose (at center), a nucleobase called adenine (upper right), and one phosphate group (left). The deoxyribose sugar joined only to the nitrogenous base forms a Deoxyribonucleoside called deoxyadenosine, whereas the whole structure along with the phosphate group is a nucleotide, a constituent of DNA with the name deoxyadenosine monophosphate.

Nucleotides are organic molecules composed of a nitrogenous base, a pentose sugar and a phosphate. They serve as monomeric units of the nucleic acid polymers – deoxyribonucleic acid (DNA) and ribonucleic acid (RNA), both of which are essential biomolecules within all life-forms on Earth. Nucleotides are obtained in the diet and are also synthesized from common nutrients by the liver.

Nucleotides are composed of three subunit molecules: a nucleobase, a five-carbon sugar (ribose or deoxyribose), and a phosphate group consisting of one to three phosphates. The four nucleobases in DNA are guanine, adenine, cytosine, and thymine (G, A, C, and T); in RNA, uracil (U) is used in place of thymine.

Nucleotides also play a central role in metabolism at a fundamental, cellular level. They provide chemical energy—in the form of the nucleoside triphosphates, adenosine triphosphate (ATP), guanosine triphosphate (GTP), cytidine triphosphate (CTP), and uridine triphosphate (UTP)—throughout the cell for the many cellular functions that demand energy, including: amino acid, protein and cell membrane synthesis, moving the cell and cell parts (both internally and intercellularly), cell division, etc. In addition, nucleotides participate in cell signaling (cyclic guanosine monophosphate or cGMP and cyclic adenosine monophosphate or cAMP) and are incorporated into important cofactors of enzymatic reactions (e.g., coenzyme A, FAD, FMN, NAD, and NADP^{+}).

In experimental biochemistry, nucleotides can be radiolabeled using radionuclides to yield radionucleotides.

5-nucleotides are also used in flavour enhancers as food additive to enhance the umami taste, often in the form of a yeast extract.

== Structure ==
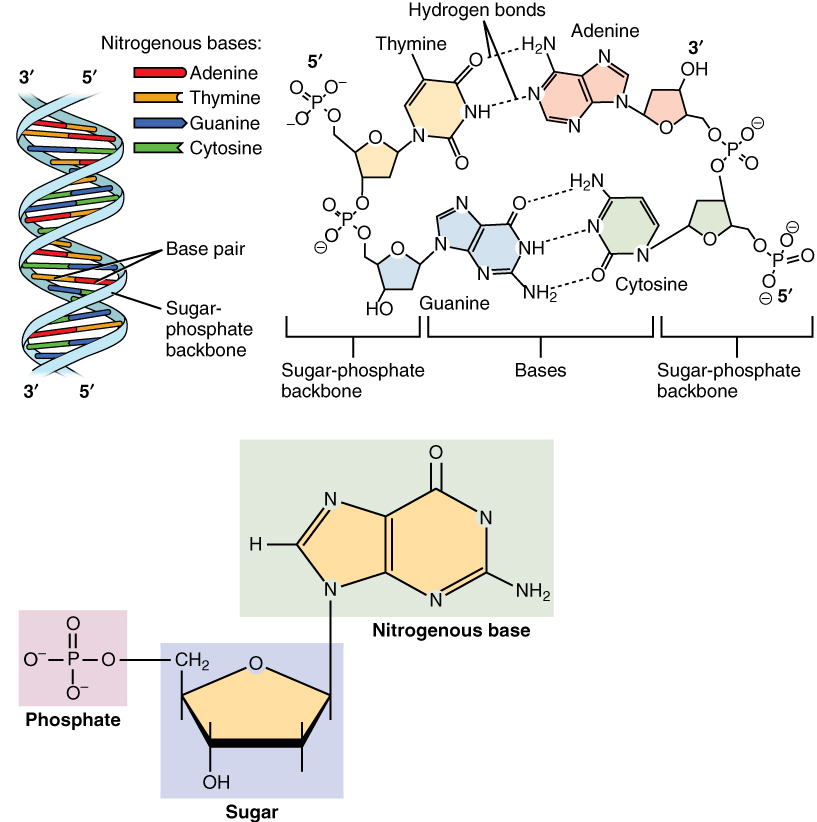
Showing the arrangement of nucleotides within the structure of nucleic acids: At lower left, a monophosphate nucleotide; its nitrogenous base represents one side of a base-pair. At the upper right, four nucleotides form two base-pairs: thymine and adenine (connected by double hydrogen bonds) and guanine and cytosine (connected by triple hydrogen bonds). The individual nucleotide monomers are chain-joined at their sugar and phosphate molecules, forming two 'backbones' (a double helix) of nucleic acid, shown at upper left.

A nucleotide is composed of three distinctive chemical sub-units: a five-carbon sugar molecule, a nucleobase (the two of which together are called a nucleoside), and one phosphate group. With all three joined, a nucleotide is also termed a "nucleoside monophosphate", "nucleoside diphosphate" or "nucleoside triphosphate", depending on how many phosphates make up the phosphate group.

In nucleic acids, nucleotides contain either a purine or a pyrimidine base—i.e., the nucleobase molecule, also known as a nitrogenous base—and are termed ribonucleotides if the sugar is ribose, or deoxyribonucleotides if the sugar is deoxyribose. Individual phosphate molecules repetitively connect the sugar-ring molecules in two adjacent nucleotide monomers, thereby connecting the nucleotide monomers of a nucleic acid end-to-end into a long chain. These chain-joins of sugar and phosphate molecules create a 'backbone' strand for a single- or double helix. In any one strand, the chemical orientation (directionality) of the chain-joins runs from the 5'-end to the 3'-end (read: 5 prime-end to 3 prime-end)—referring to the five carbon sites on sugar molecules in adjacent nucleotides. In a double helix, the two strands are oriented in opposite directions, which permits base pairing and complementarity between the base-pairs, all which is essential for replicating or transcribing the encoded information found in DNA.

Nucleic acids, then, are polymeric macromolecules assembled from nucleotides, the monomer-units of nucleic acids. The purine bases adenine and guanine and pyrimidine base cytosine occur in both DNA and RNA, while the pyrimidine bases thymine (in DNA) and uracil (in RNA) occur in just one. Adenine forms a base pair with thymine with two hydrogen bonds, while guanine pairs with cytosine with three hydrogen bonds.

In addition to being building blocks for the construction of nucleic acid polymers, singular nucleotides play roles in cellular energy storage and provision, cellular signaling, as a source of phosphate groups used to modulate the activity of proteins and other signaling molecules, and as enzymatic cofactors, often carrying out redox reactions. Signaling cyclic nucleotides are formed by binding the phosphate group twice to the same sugar molecule, bridging the 5'- and 3'- hydroxyl groups of the sugar. Some signaling nucleotides differ from the standard single-phosphate group configuration, in having multiple phosphate groups attached to different positions on the sugar. Nucleotide cofactors include a wider range of chemical groups attached to the sugar via the glycosidic bond, including nicotinamide and flavin, and in the latter case, the ribose sugar is linear rather than forming the ring seen in other nucleotides.

Structural elements of three nucleotides—where one-, two- or three-phosphates are attached to the nucleoside (in yellow, blue, green) at center: 1st, the nucleotide termed as a nucleoside monophosphate is formed by adding a phosphate (in red); 2nd, adding a second phosphate forms a nucleoside diphosphate; 3rd, adding a third phosphate results in a nucleoside triphosphate. + The nitrogenous base (nucleobase) is indicated by "Base" and "glycosidic bond" (sugar bond). All five primary, or canonical, bases—the purines and pyrimidines—are sketched at right (in blue).

Examples of non-nucleic acid nucleotides
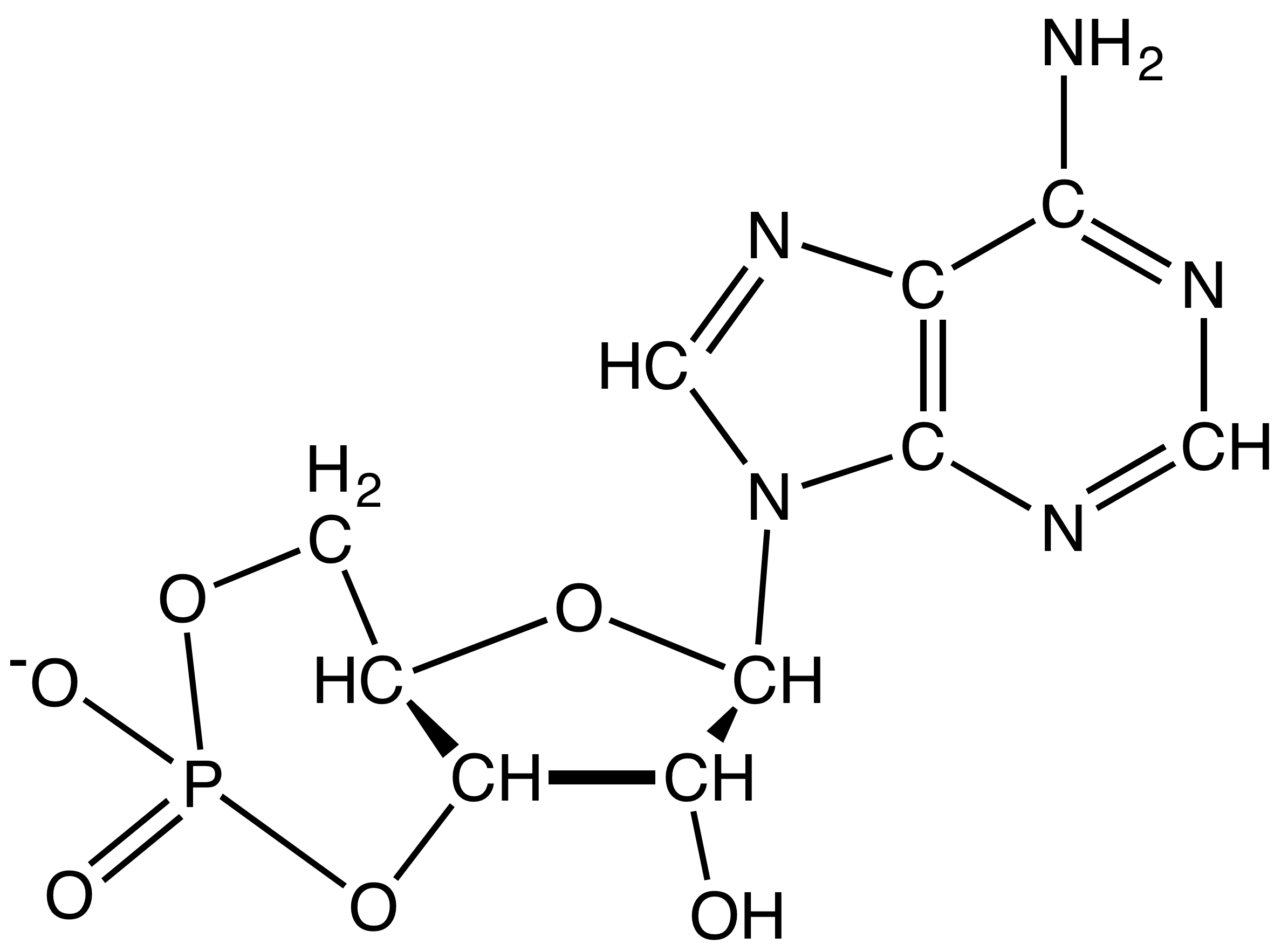
cAMP, a cyclic nucleotide signaling molecule with a single phosphate linked to both 5- and 3-positions.

pppGpp, a nucleotide signaling molecule with both 5'- and 3'-phosphates.

NADP, a dinucleotide enzymatic cofactor.

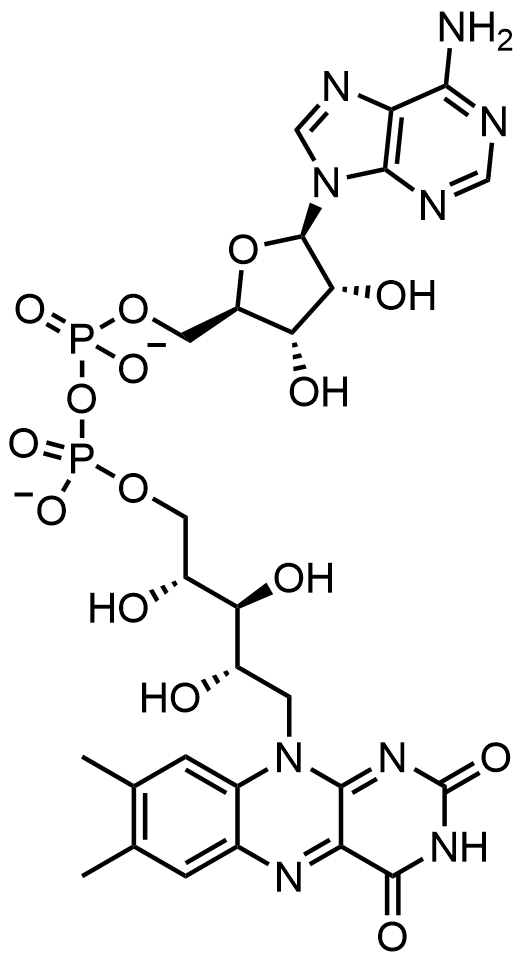
FAD, a dinucleotide enzymatic cofactor in which one of the ribose sugars adopts a linear configuration rather than a ring.

== Synthesis ==
Nucleotides can be synthesized by a variety of means, both in vitro and in vivo.

In vitro, protecting groups may be used during laboratory production of nucleotides. A purified nucleoside is protected to create a phosphoramidite, which can then be used to obtain analogues not found in nature and/or to synthesize an oligonucleotide.

In vivo, nucleotides can be synthesized de novo or recycled through salvage pathways. The components used in de novo nucleotide synthesis are derived from biosynthetic precursors of carbohydrate and amino acid metabolism, and from ammonia and carbon dioxide. Recently it has been also demonstrated that cellular bicarbonate metabolism can be regulated by mTORC1 signaling. The liver is the major organ of de novo synthesis of all four nucleotides. De novo synthesis of pyrimidines and purines follows two different pathways. Pyrimidines are synthesized first from aspartate and carbamoyl-phosphate in the cytoplasm to the common precursor ring structure orotic acid, onto which a phosphorylated ribosyl unit is covalently linked. Purines, however, are first synthesized from the sugar template onto which the ring synthesis occurs. For reference, the syntheses of the purine and pyrimidine nucleotides are carried out by several enzymes in the cytoplasm of the cell, not within a specific organelle. Nucleotides undergo breakdown such that useful parts can be reused in synthesis reactions to create new nucleotides.

=== Pyrimidine ribonucleotide synthesis ===
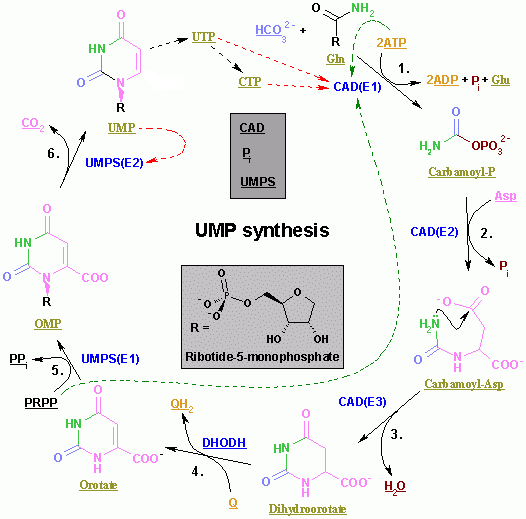
The synthesis of UMP. enzymes coenzymes substrate names metal ions inorganic molecules

The synthesis of the pyrimidines cytidine triphosphate (CTP) and uridine triphosphate (UTP) occurs in the cytoplasm and starts with the formation of carbamoyl phosphate from glutamine and CO_{2}. Next, aspartate carbamoyltransferase catalyzes a condensation reaction between aspartate and carbamoyl phosphate to form carbamoyl aspartic acid, which is cyclized into 4,5-dihydroorotic acid by dihydroorotase. The latter is converted to orotate by dihydroorotate oxidase. The net reaction is:

(S)-Dihydroorotate + O_{2} → Orotate + H_{2}O_{2}

Orotate is covalently linked with a phosphorylated ribosyl unit. The covalent linkage between the ribose and pyrimidine occurs at position C_{1} of the ribose unit, which contains a pyrophosphate, and N_{1} of the pyrimidine ring. Orotate phosphoribosyltransferase (PRPP transferase) catalyzes the net reaction yielding orotidine 5'-monophosphate (OMP):

Orotate + 5-Phospho-α-D-ribose 1-diphosphate (PRPP) → Orotidine 5'-phosphate + Pyrophosphate

Orotidine 5'-monophosphate is decarboxylated by orotidine-5'-phosphate decarboxylase to form uridine monophosphate (UMP). PRPP transferase catalyzes both the ribosylation and decarboxylation reactions, forming UMP from orotic acid in the presence of PRPP. It is from UMP that other pyrimidine nucleotides are derived. UMP is phosphorylated by two kinases to uridine triphosphate (UTP) via two sequential reactions with ATP. First, the diphosphate from UDP is produced, which in turn is phosphorylated to UTP. Both steps are fueled by ATP hydrolysis:

ATP + UMP → ADP + UDP

UDP + ATP → UTP + ADP

CTP is subsequently formed by the amination of UTP by the catalytic activity of CTP synthetase. Glutamine is the NH_{3} donor and the reaction is fueled by ATP hydrolysis, too:

UTP + Glutamine + ATP + H_{2}O → CTP + ADP + P_{i}

Cytidine monophosphate (CMP) is derived from cytidine triphosphate (CTP) with subsequent loss of two phosphates.

=== Purine ribonucleotide synthesis ===
The atoms that are used to build the purine nucleotides come from a variety of sources:

The biosynthetic origins of purine ring atoms N_{1} arises from the amine group of Asp C_{2} and C_{8} originate from formate N_{3} and N_{9} are contributed by the amide group of Gln C_{4}, C_{5} and N_{7} are derived from Gly C_{6} comes from HCO_{3}^{−} (CO_{2})

Diagram of the synthesis of IMP. enzymes coenzymes substrate names metal ions inorganic molecules

The de novo synthesis of purine nucleotides by which these precursors are incorporated into the purine ring proceeds by a 10-step pathway to the branch-point intermediate IMP, the nucleotide of the base hypoxanthine. AMP and GMP are subsequently synthesized from this intermediate via separate, two-step pathways. Thus, purine moieties are initially formed as part of the ribonucleotides rather than as free bases.

Six enzymes take part in IMP synthesis. Three of them are multifunctional:

- GART (reactions 2, 3, and 5)
- PAICS (reactions 6, and 7)
- ATIC (reactions 9, and 10)

The pathway starts with the formation of PRPP. PRPS1 is the enzyme that activates R5P, which is formed primarily by the pentose phosphate pathway, to PRPP by reacting it with ATP. The reaction is unusual in that a pyrophosphoryl group is directly transferred from ATP to C_{1} of R5P and that the product has the α configuration about C1. This reaction is also shared with the pathways for the synthesis of Trp, His, and the pyrimidine nucleotides. Being on a major metabolic crossroad and requiring much energy, this reaction is highly regulated.

In the first reaction unique to purine nucleotide biosynthesis, PPAT catalyzes the displacement of PRPP's pyrophosphate group (PP_{i}) by an amide nitrogen donated from either glutamine (N), glycine (N&C), aspartate (N), folic acid (C_{1}), or CO_{2}. This is the committed step in purine synthesis. The reaction occurs with the inversion of configuration about ribose C_{1}, thereby forming β-5-phosphorybosylamine (5-PRA) and establishing the anomeric form of the future nucleotide.

Next, a glycine is incorporated fueled by ATP hydrolysis, and the carboxyl group forms an amine bond to the NH_{2} previously introduced. A one-carbon unit from folic acid coenzyme N_{10}-formyl-THF is then added to the amino group of the substituted glycine followed by the closure of the imidazole ring. Next, a second NH_{2} group is transferred from glutamine to the first carbon of the glycine unit. A carboxylation of the second carbon of the glycin unit is concomitantly added. This new carbon is modified by the addition of a third NH_{2} unit, this time transferred from an aspartate residue. Finally, a second one-carbon unit from formyl-THF is added to the nitrogen group and the ring is covalently closed to form the common purine precursor inosine monophosphate (IMP).

Inosine monophosphate is converted to adenosine monophosphate in two steps. First, GTP hydrolysis fuels the addition of aspartate to IMP by adenylosuccinate synthase, substituting the carbonyl oxygen for a nitrogen and forming the intermediate adenylosuccinate. Fumarate is then cleaved off forming adenosine monophosphate. This step is catalyzed by adenylosuccinate lyase.

Inosine monophosphate is converted to guanosine monophosphate by the oxidation of IMP forming xanthylate, followed by the insertion of an amino group at C_{2}. NAD^{+} is the electron acceptor in the oxidation reaction. The amide group transfer from glutamine is fueled by ATP hydrolysis.

=== Pyrimidine and purine degradation ===
In humans, pyrimidine rings (C, T, U) can be degraded completely to CO_{2} and NH_{3} (urea excretion). That having been said, purine rings (G, A) cannot. Instead, they are degraded to the metabolically inert uric acid which is then excreted from the body. Uric acid is formed when GMP is split into the base guanine and ribose. Guanine is deaminated to xanthine which in turn is oxidized to uric acid. This last reaction is irreversible. Similarly, uric acid can be formed when AMP is deaminated to IMP from which the ribose unit is removed to form hypoxanthine. Hypoxanthine is oxidized to xanthine and finally to uric acid. Instead of uric acid secretion, guanine and IMP can be used for recycling purposes and nucleic acid synthesis in the presence of PRPP and aspartate (NH_{3} donor).

== Quantification of dNTP pools ==
The precise measurement of intracellular deoxynucleoside triphosphate (dNTP) pools is critical for understanding DNA replication, repair, and cellular metabolism, as imbalances in these pools can lead to increased mutation rates or genomic instability. Modern analytical approaches primarily rely on liquid chromatography coupled with mass spectrometry (LC-MS) to achieve high sensitivity and specificity. Beyond traditional methods, advanced techniques such as LC-MS/MS with triple quadrupole mass spectrometers (using Multiple Reaction Monitoring, MRM) and high-resolution mass spectrometry (HRMS)—including Orbitrap or time-of-flight (TOF) analyzers—allow for the simultaneous quantification of all four dNTPs even from limited biological samples. Recent methodological developments have introduced specialized assays, such as the DNA polymerase-based fluorescence assay, which provides a sensitive, non-radioactive alternative for measuring dNTP levels in various cell types. Furthermore, comprehensive MS-based profiling has become essential in studying how dNTP pool alterations contribute to diseases like cancer and mitochondrial disorders. Beyond canonical dNTPs, non-canonical variants such as dUTP and methylated dCTP derivatives also exist within the nucleotide pool. Their quantification is challenging but essential for understanding genomic instability. Recent enzymatic assays, utilizing selective hydrolases (e.g., dUTPase or mycobacterial Dcd:dut), allow for the highly sensitive fluorescent detection of these species, providing an alternative to specialized LC-MS techniques.

== Prebiotic synthesis of nucleotides ==
Theories about the origin of life require knowledge of chemical pathways that permit formation of life's key building blocks under plausible prebiotic conditions. The RNA world hypothesis holds that in the primordial soup there existed free-floating ribonucleotides, the fundamental molecules that combine in series to form RNA. Complex molecules like RNA must have arisen from small molecules whose reactivity was governed by physico-chemical processes. RNA is composed of purine and pyrimidine nucleotides, both of which are necessary for reliable information transfer, and thus Darwinian evolution. Becker et al. showed how pyrimidine nucleosides can be synthesized from small molecules and ribose, driven solely by wet-dry cycles. Purine nucleosides can be synthesized by a similar pathway. 5'-mono- and di-phosphates also form selectively from phosphate-containing minerals, allowing concurrent formation of polyribonucleotides with both the purine and pyrimidine bases. Thus a reaction network towards the purine and pyrimidine RNA building blocks can be established starting from simple atmospheric or volcanic molecules.

== Unnatural base pair (UBP) ==
An unnatural base pair (UBP) is a designed subunit (or nucleobase) of DNA which is created in a laboratory and does not occur in nature. Examples include d5SICS and dNaM. These artificial nucleotides bearing hydrophobic nucleobases, feature two fused aromatic rings that form a (d5SICS–dNaM) complex or base pair in DNA. E. coli have been induced to replicate a plasmid containing UBPs through multiple generations. This is the first known example of a living organism passing along an expanded genetic code to subsequent generations.

== Medical applications of synthetic nucleotides ==
The applications of synthetic nucleotides vary widely and include disease diagnosis, treatment, or precision medicine.

1. Antiviral or antiretroviral agents: several nucleotide derivatives have been used in the treatment against infection with Hepatitis and HIV. Examples of direct nucleoside analog reverse-transcriptase inhibitors (NRTIs) include Tenofovir disoproxil, Tenofovir alafenamide, and Sofosbuvir. On the other hand, agents such as Mericitabine, Lamivudine, Entecavir and Telbivudine must first undergo metabolization via phosphorylation to become activated.
2. Antisense oligonucleotides (ASO): synthetic oligonucleotides have been used in the treatment of rare heritable diseases since they can bind specific RNA transcripts and ultimately modulate protein expression. Spinal muscular atrophy, amyotrophic lateral sclerosis, homozygous familial hypercholesterolemia, and primary hyperoxaluria type 1 are all amenable to ASO-based therapy. The application of oligonucleotides is a new frontier in precision medicine and management of conditions which are untreatable.
3. Synthetic guide RNA (gRNA): synthetic nucleotides can be used to design gRNA which are essential for the proper function of gene-editing technologies such as CRISPR-Cas9.

== Length unit ==
Nucleotide (abbreviated "nt") is a common unit of length for single-stranded nucleic acids, similar to how base pair is a unit of length for double-stranded nucleic acids.

== Abbreviation codes for degenerate bases ==
The IUPAC has designated the symbols for nucleotides. Apart from the five (A, G, C, T/U) bases, often degenerate bases are used especially for designing PCR primers. These nucleotide codes are listed here. Some primer sequences may also include the character "I", which codes for the non-standard nucleotide inosine. Inosine occurs in tRNAs and will pair with adenine, cytosine, or thymine. This character does not appear in the following table, however, because it does not represent a degeneracy. While inosine can serve a similar function as the degeneracy "H", it is an actual nucleotide, rather than a representation of a mix of nucleotides that covers each possible pairing needed.

Symbol	Description	Bases represented				
A	adenine	A				1
C	cytosine		C			1
G	guanine			G		1
T	thymine				T	1
U	uracil				U	1
W	weak	A			T	2
S	strong		C	G		2
M	amino	A	C			2
K	keto			G	T	2
R	purine	A		G		2
Y	pyrimidine		C		T	2
B	not A (B comes after A)		C	G	T	3
D	not C (D comes after C)	A		G	T	3
H	not G (H comes after G)	A	C		T	3
V	not T (V comes after T and U)	A	C	G		3
N	any base (not a gap)	A	C	G	T	4

== See also ==
- Biology
- Chromosome
- Gene
- Genetics
- Nucleic acid sequence – Succession of nucleotides in a nucleic acid
- Nucleobase – Nitrogen-containing biological compounds that form nucleosides
- Nucleic acid analogue – Compound analogous to naturally occurring RNA and DNA
- Artificially Expanded Genetic Information System – "Hachimoji DNA" with 8 bases, etc.
