= Wernberg coloring =

In bioinformatics, the Wernberg coloring, or Wernberg transformation is a way of color-coding DNA nucleotides.

== Definition ==
The Wernberg coloring is defined as the following map:

Nucleotide	Color
Adenine	Red
Thymine	Blue
Guanine	Yellow
Cytosine	Green
Others	Black

There is currently ongoing discussion for including other potential base pairs, such as uracil, into the standard.
