= Pyrimidine metabolism =

Set of biological pathways

Pyrimidine biosynthesis occurs both in the body and through organic synthesis.

== De novo biosynthesis of pyrimidine ==
Summary of pyrimidine nucleotide biosynthesis pathways
Steps	Enzymes	Products	Notes
1	carbamoyl phosphate synthetase II	carbamoyl phosphate	This is the regulated step in the pyrimidine biosynthesis in animals.
2	aspartic transcarbamoylase (aspartate carbamoyl transferase)	carbamoyl aspartic acid	The phosphate group is replaced with Aspartate. This is the regulated step in the pyrimidine biosynthesis in bacteria.
3	dihydroorotase	dihydroorotate	Ring formation and Dehydration.
4	dihydroorotate dehydrogenase (the only mitochondrial enzyme)	orotate	Dihydroorotate then enters the mitochondria where it is oxidized through removal of hydrogens. This is the only mitochondrial step in nucleotide ring biosynthesis.
5	orotate phosphoribosyltransferase	OMP	PRPP donates a Ribose group.
6	OMP decarboxylase	UMP	Decarboxylation
	uridine-cytidine kinase 2	UDP	Phosphorylation. ATP is used.
	nucleoside diphosphate kinase	UTP	Phosphorylation. ATP is used.
	CTP synthase	CTP	Glutamine and ATP are used.

De novo biosynthesis of a pyrimidine is catalyzed by three gene products: CAD, dihydroorotate dehydrogenase (DHODH) and uridine monophosphate synthetase (UMPS). The first three enzymes of the process are all coded by the same gene, CAD, which consists of carbamoyl phosphate synthetase II, aspartate carbamoyltransferase and dihydroorotase. DHODH, unlike CAD and UMPS, is a mono-functional enzyme and is localized in the mitochondria. UMPS is a bifunctional enzyme consisting of orotate phosphoribosyltransferase (OPRT) and orotidine monophosphate decarboxylase (OMPDC). Both CAD and UMPS are localized around the mitochondria, in the cytosol. In Fungi, a similar protein exists but lacks the dihydroorotase function: another protein catalyzes the second step.

In other organisms (Bacteria, Archaea and the other Eukaryota), the first three steps are done by three different enzymes.

== Pyrimidine catabolism ==
Pyrimidines are ultimately catabolized (degraded) to CO_{2}, H_{2}O, and urea. Cytosine can be broken down to uracil, which can be further broken down to N-carbamoyl-β-alanine, and then to beta-alanine, CO_{2}, and ammonia by beta-ureidopropionase. Thymine is broken down into β-aminoisobutyrate which can be further broken down into intermediates eventually leading into the citric acid cycle.

β-aminoisobutyrate acts as a rough indicator for rate of DNA turnover.

=== Regulations of pyrimidine nucleotide biosynthesis ===
Through negative feedback inhibition, the end-products UTP and UDP prevent the enzyme CAD from catalyzing the reaction in animals. Conversely, PRPP and ATP act as positive effectors that enhance the enzyme's activity.

== Pharmacotherapy ==
Modulating the pyrimidine metabolism pharmacologically has therapeutical uses, and could implement in cancer treatment.

Pyrimidine synthesis inhibitors are used in active moderate to severe rheumatoid arthritis and psoriatic arthritis, as well as in multiple sclerosis. Examples include Leflunomide and Teriflunomide (the active metabolite of leflunomide).

== Prebiotic synthesis of pyrimidine nucleotides ==
In order to understand how life arose, knowledge is required of the chemical pathways that permit formation of the key building blocks of life under plausible prebiotic conditions. The RNA world hypothesis holds that in the primordial soup there existed free-floating pyrimidine and purine ribonucleotides, the fundamental molecules that combine in series to form RNA. Complex molecules such as RNA must have emerged from relatively small molecules whose reactivity was governed by physico-chemical processes. RNA is composed of pyrimidine and purine nucleotides, both of which are necessary for reliable information transfer, and thus natural selection and Darwinian evolution. Becker et al. showed how pyrimidine nucleosides can be synthesized from small molecules and ribose, driven solely by wet-dry cycles.
