= Orotate phosphoribosyltransferase =

Class of enzymes

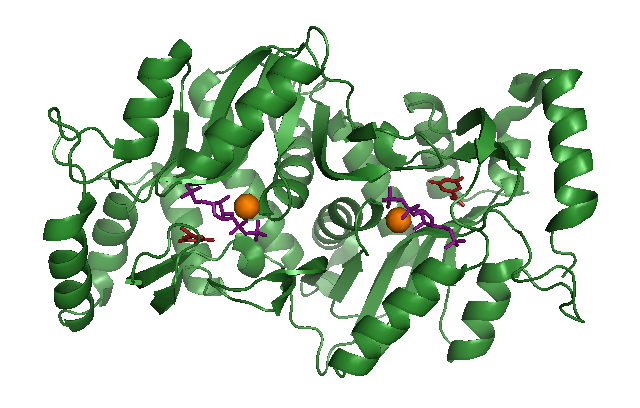
- S. cerevisiae orotate phosphoribosyl transferase bound to its substrates. From PDB file 2PS1.

Identifiers
- EC no.: 2.4.2.10
- CAS no.: 9030-25-5

Databases
- IntEnz: IntEnz view
- BRENDA: BRENDA entry
- ExPASy: NiceZyme view
- KEGG: KEGG entry
- MetaCyc: metabolic pathway
- PRIAM: profile
- PDB structures: RCSB PDB PDBe PDBsum
- Gene Ontology: AmiGO / QuickGO
Search
- PMC: articles
- PubMed: articles
- NCBI: proteins

Orotate phosphoribosyltransferase (OPRTase) or orotic acid phosphoribosyltransferase is an enzyme involved in pyrimidine biosynthesis. It catalyzes the formation of orotidine 5'-monophosphate (OMP) from orotate and phosphoribosyl pyrophosphate. In yeast and bacteria, orotate phosphoribosyltransferase is an independent enzyme with a unique gene coding for the protein, whereas in mammals and other multicellular organisms, the catalytic function is carried out by a domain of the bifunctional enzyme UMP synthase (UMPS).

== Biological background ==
Reaction catalyzed by orotate phosphoribosyltransferase. Substrates PRPP and orotate are converted to orotidylate and inorganic pyrophosphate.

As OPRTase is part of a bifunctional complex UMP synthase in humans, the function and stability of this enzyme is not necessarily directly associated with disorders in the human body. It is however reasonable to believe that a dysfunction in one of the enzymes will cause a dysfunction of the whole enzyme. Defects in UMP synthase is associated with hypochromic anemia. In mammals, this bifunctional enzyme UMPS converts orotic acid into uridine monophosphate (UMP). Orotate phosphoribosyltransferase is located at the N-terminal domain of UMP synthase. This process happens in multiple steps with orotate phosphoribosyltransferase responsible for the first step of adding a ribose ring to orotate. In this step, orotic acid is converted into orotidylate using PRPP (phosphoribosyl pyrophosphate) as a cosubstrate. This reaction is driven by the hydrolysis of pyrophosphate. Orotidylate decarboxylase is located at the C-terminal domain of UMPS and converts this orotidylate intermediate into uridine monophosphate (also referred to as uridylate or UMP) via decarboxylation. These two-steps are rapid and irreversible in mammals. In other pyrimidine auxotrophs that do not have this bifunctional enzyme, usually less complex organisms, two separate enzymes are required to carry out this reaction. Both orotidylate and uridylate are major pyrimidine nucleotides, as uridylate is a precursor to RNA. Uridylate (UMP) is later converted to UDP via phosphorylation by UMP kinase and ATP and then nucleoside diphosphate kinase reversibly phosphorylates UDP to UTP. UTP can then be aminated through catalysis by cytidine triphosphate synthetase to from CTP.

== Enzyme mechanism ==
The reaction of orotic acid (orotate) to orotidylate is catalyzed by orotate phophoribosyltransferase with the cofactor PRPP, which is a cofactor commonly used for nucleotide synthesis. It transfers pyrophosphoryl groups very favorably with a ΔG of -8.3 + 0.5 kcal/mol. Two main interactions attract PRPP to assist orotate phophoribosyltransferase in this reaction. First, orotate phophoribosyltransferase has Aspartic acid- Aspartic acid residues next to its PRPP-binding motif which interact with the ribosyl 2-/3- hydroxyl groups that stabilize the movement of Carbon-1 of the bound ribosyl group. The stabilization occurs through a hydrogen bonding network of these hydroxyl groups with pyrophosphate, water and magnesium. Second, the side-chains of the C-terminal end of the PRPP-binding motif interact favorably with PRPP’s 5-phosphate.

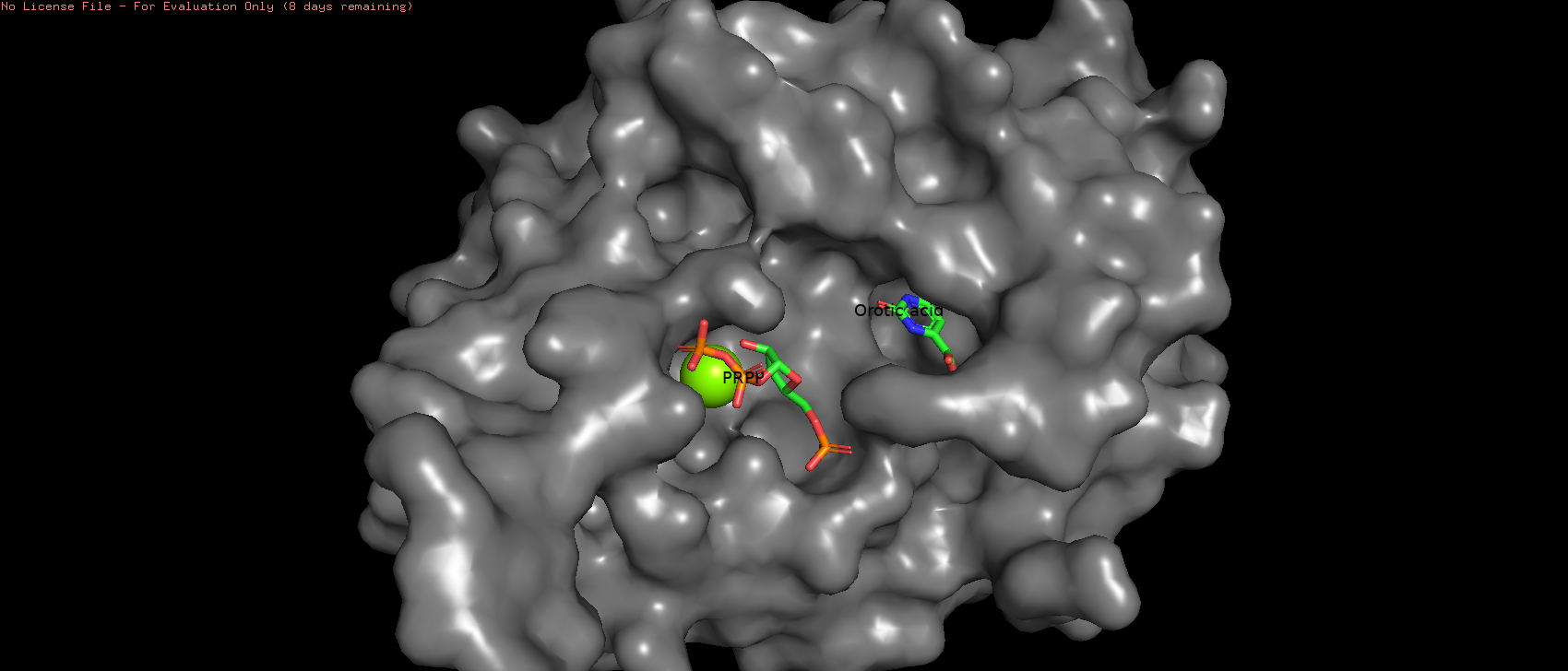
Orotate phosphoribosyltransferase overall structure with orotic acid, magnesium and PRPP in the active site pocket.

In B. subtilis, PRPP is bound to these two sites with a K_{d} of 33mM. When orotate is present, pyrophosphate binding affinity is increased fourfold and the reaction undergoes burst kinetics, with rapid phosphoribosyl transfer and then slow release of products. This slow release is thought to be due to the solvent-exposed loop of orotate phosphoribosyltransferase that protects the active site during the first step. The loop opening happens in two-steps with the PRPP dissociation unfavorable and slow since the loop closes 85% of the time.

Three key pyrimidine nucleosides include uridine, cytidine and thymidine, and they play major roles in nucleic acid biosynthesis as well as carbohydrate and lipid metabolism. Pyrimidine phosphoribosyltransferases such as orotate phosphoribosyltransferase activate their substrates by forming S_{N}1-like transition states, facilitating migration of the ribosyl anomeric carbon region to MgPP_{i}. Like other pyrimidine phosphoribosyltransferases, orotate phosphoribosyltransferase has a flexible loop that moves to position groups in the ideal positions for catalysis. They also use many water molecules to hold everything in place during the reaction.

== Enzyme structure ==
The crystal structure of OPRTase has been solved several times by various scientific groups. In bacteria, the overall structure is a dimer of two subunits, each consisting of seven α-helices and ten β-strands, with a molecular weight of 23919.13 Da. Orotate phosphoribosyltransferase has a core part plus a flexible loop, which when closed prevents solvent from entering during reaction. In other organisms such as mammals, insects and slime modes it is one of the domains of UMP synthase, with the other being orotidylate decarboxylase. The N-terminal has a pair of antiparallel strands, with residues that interact with bound orotate and Lys 26 that extends to the active site and forms a bond with the flexible loop in its closed form. Orotic acid and PRPP are stabilized in the active site mostly by hydrogen bonding with stabilizing interactions from Lys 26, Phe 34 and Phe 35 to orotic acid, as well as Thr 128, Ala 129, Gly 130, Ala 132, Asp 124, Lys 26 and Lys 73 to PRPP. When Lys 26 is mutated, orotate phosphoribosyltransferase often exhibits reduced activity and specificity.

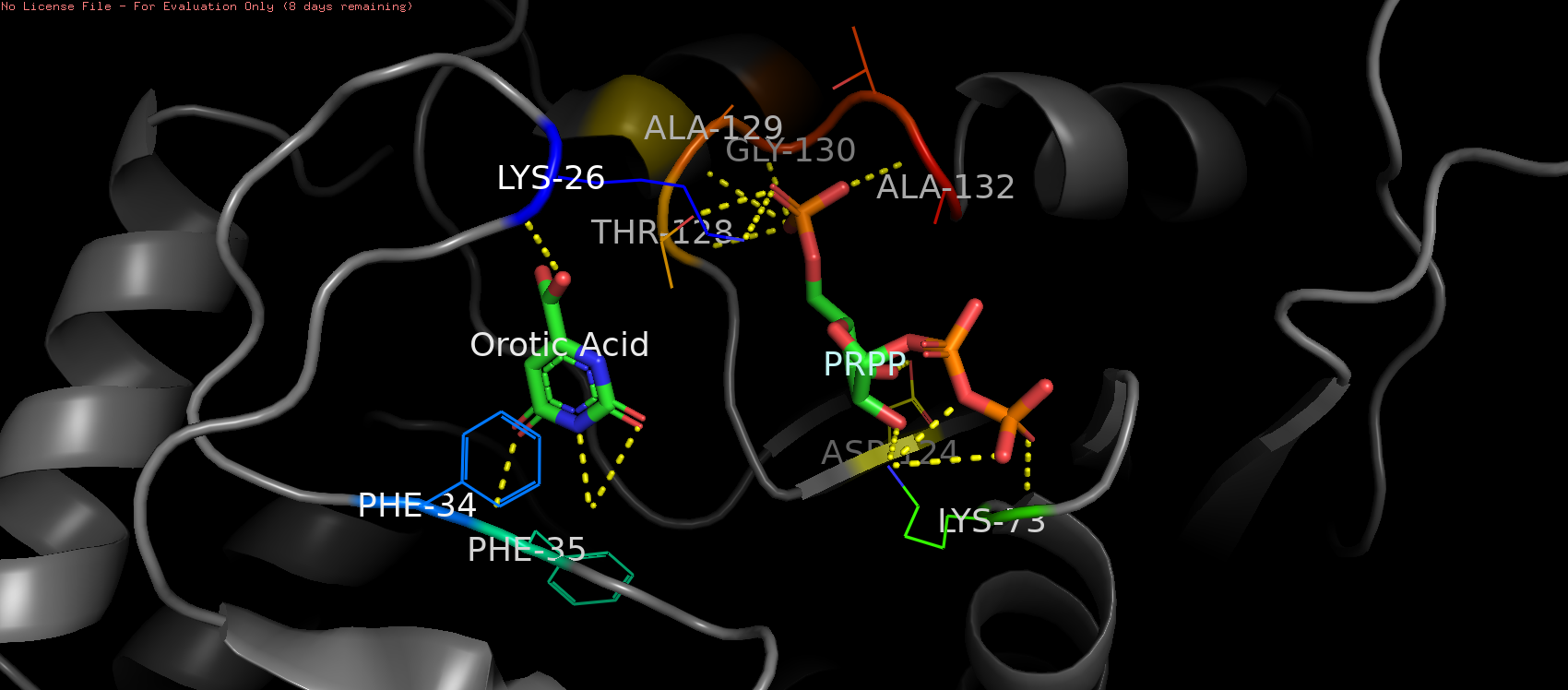
Active site of orotate phosphoribosyltransferase bound to orotic acid and PRPP in Salmonella typhimurium. Stabilizing residues are shown, including Lys 26, Phe 34 and Phe 35 which stabilize orotic acid, as well as Thr 128, Ala 129, Gly 130, Ala 132, Asp 124, Lys 26 and Lys 73.

== Disease relevance ==
Defects in orotate phosphoribosyltransferase have been implicated in numerous medical conditions. Defects in the orotate phosphoribosyltransferase domain of UMPS cause orotic aciduria in humans, which is a rare hereditary metabolic disease resulting from problems with pyrimidine metabolism. It can lead to megaloblastic anemia and orotic acid crystalluria, which is associated with physical and mental impairments. Orotic aciduria was first reported in 1959 when excess orotic acid was found in the urine of an infant. When individuals have a mutation leading to loss of orotate phosphoribosyltransferase activity and thus UTP production, orotic acid builds up and can be as high as 1.5g/day in infant urine. This is because UTP is the normal end product in healthy individuals in the pyrimidine synthetic pathway and normally regulates the pathway. Orotic acid buildup can lead to precipitation in the kidney and eventually renal failure. Similarly, in Holstein cattle, UMPS deficiency is caused by an autosomal disorder which leads to death of offspring in the early embryonic state.

Orotate phosphoribosyltransferase is also the main enzyme involved in converted 5-flurouracil to 5-F-UMP through phosphoribosylation. Some scientific studies have shown that orotate phosphoribosyltransferase potentially may play a role in cancer prognostics. For instance, one study found that the ratio of gene expression of orotate phosphoribosyltransferase to dihydropyrimidine dehydrogenase affects the prognosis of metastatic colorectal cancer patients after fluropyrimidine-based chemotherapy. 5-F-UMP is thought to become a suicide inhibitor for thymidylate synthetase and plays an important role in tumor growth inhibition. When resectable colorectal cancer patients were treated with oral 5-flurouracil, patients with high levels of orotate phosphoribosyltransferase had significantly better survival outcomes. Similarly prognosis potential based on orotate phosphoribosyltransferase levels and activity have been implicated in bladder carcinoma and gastric carcinoma.

== See also ==
- Orotidylate decarboxylase
- UMP synthase
- Pyrimidine Biosynthesis
- Orotic acid
- PRPP
