= Orotate reductase (NADH) =

Class of enzymes

orotate reductase (NADH)

Identifiers
- EC no.: 1.3.1.14
- CAS no.: 37255-26-8

Databases
- BRENDA: enzyme data
- ExPASy: NiceZyme view
- KEGG: enzyme entry
- MetaCyc: metabolic pathway
- Rhea: reactions
- PDB structures: RCSB PDB PDBe PDBsum
- Gene Ontology: AmiGO / QuickGO
Search
- PMC: articles
- PubMed: articles
- NCBI: proteins

In enzymology, orotate reductase (NADH) (EC 1.3.1.14) is an enzyme that catalyzes the chemical reaction

(S)-hydroorotic acid
+ NAD^{+}
H^{+}
H^{+}
orotic acid
+ NADH

The two substrates of this enzyme are (S)-dihydroorotic acid and oxidised nicotinamide adenine dinucleotide (NAD^{+}). Its products are orotic acid, reduced NADH, and a proton.

This enzyme belongs to the family of oxidoreductases, specifically those acting on the CH-CH group of donor with NAD+ or NADP+ as acceptor. The systematic name of this enzyme class is (S)-dihydroorotate:NAD+ oxidoreductase. This enzyme is also called orotate reductase (NADH). This enzyme participates in pyrimidine metabolism. It has 2 cofactors: flavin adenine dinucleotide, and flavin mononucleotide.
