= Orotidine 5′-phosphate decarboxylase =

Enzyme involved in pyrimidine biosynthesis

Orotidine-5'-phosphate decarboxylase
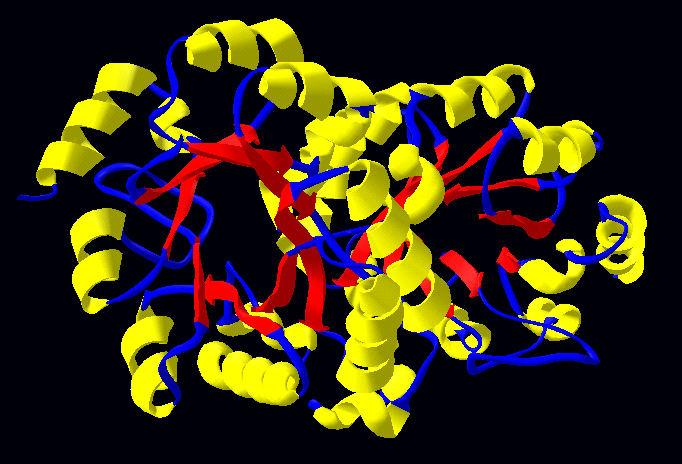
- E. coli OMP decarboxylase.

Identifiers
- EC no.: 4.1.1.23
- CAS no.: 9024-62-8

Databases
- BRENDA: enzyme data
- ExPASy: NiceZyme view
- KEGG: enzyme entry
- MetaCyc: metabolic pathway
- Rhea: reactions
- PDB structures: RCSB PDB PDBe PDBsum
- Gene Ontology: AmiGO / QuickGO
Search
- PMC: articles
- PubMed: articles
- NCBI: proteins

Orotidine 5′-phosphate decarboxylase (OMP decarboxylase) or orotidylate decarboxylase is an enzyme involved in pyrimidine biosynthesis. It catalyzes the decarboxylation of orotidine monophosphate (OMP) to form uridine monophosphate (UMP). The function of this enzyme is essential to the de novo biosynthesis of the pyrimidine nucleotides uridine triphosphate, cytidine triphosphate, and thymidine triphosphate. OMP decarboxylase has been a frequent target for scientific investigation because of its demonstrated extreme catalytic efficiency and its usefulness as a selection marker for yeast strain engineering.

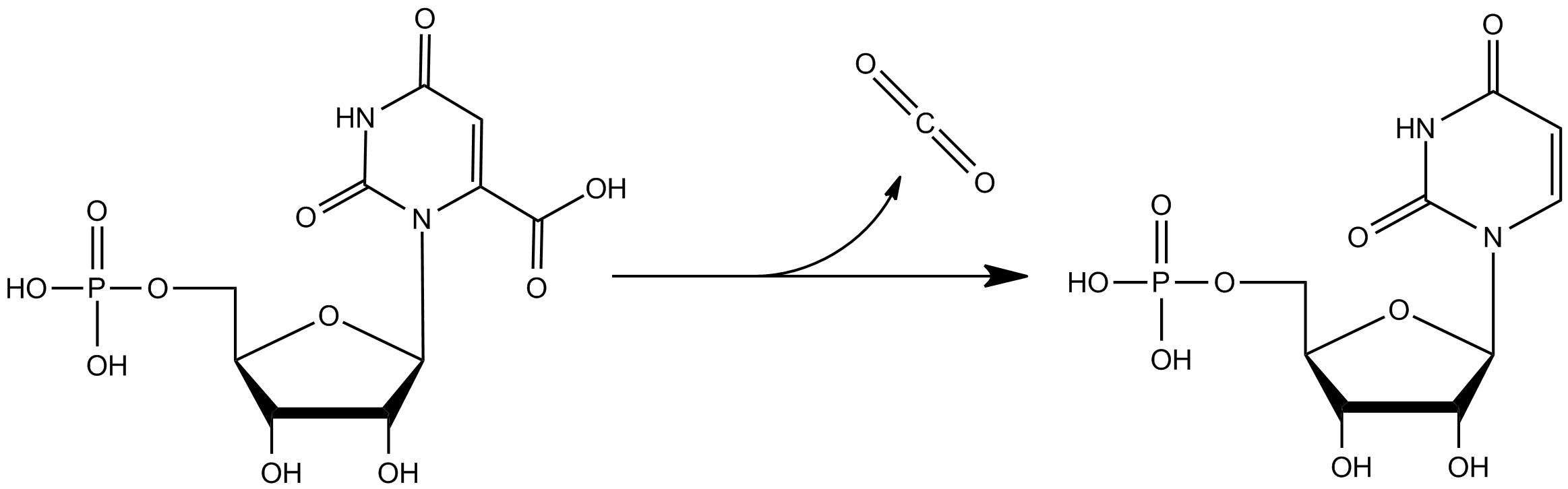
Schematic of reaction catalyzed by OMP decarboxylase

== Catalysis ==
OMP decarboxylase is known for being an extraordinarily efficient catalyst capable of accelerating the uncatalyzed reaction rate by a factor of 10^{17}. To put this in perspective, the uncatalysed reaction which would take 78 million years to convert half the reactants into products is accelerated to 18 milliseconds when catalyzed by OMP decarboxylase. This extreme enzymatic efficiency is especially interesting because OMP decarboxylases use no cofactor and contains no metal sites or prosthetic groups. The catalysis relies on a handful of charged amino acid residues positioned within the active site of the enzyme.

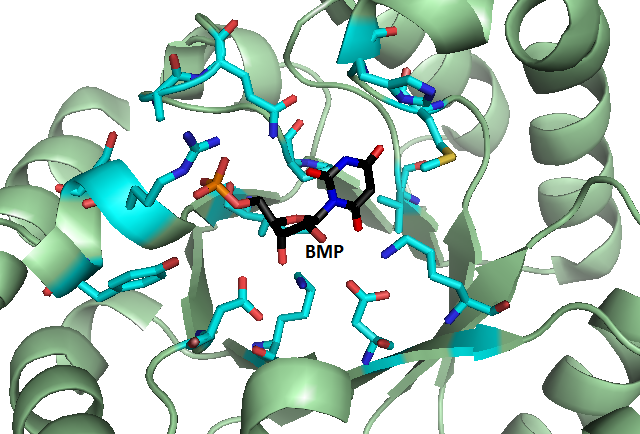
Image representing the structure of the active site of OMP decarboxylase when bound to the inhibitor BMP. Note the Lys and Asp residues surrounding the 6-hydroxyl of the substrate. (Image captured from pymol viewer snapshot of 1LOR crystal structure)

The exact mechanism by which OMP decarboxylase catalyzes its reaction has been a subject of rigorous scientific investigation. The driving force for the loss of the carboxyl linked to the C6 of the pyrimidine ring comes from the close proximity of an aspartate residue carboxyl group in the enzyme's active site, which destabilizes the ground state relative to the transition state of the uncatalyzed reaction. There have been multiple hypotheses about what form the transition state takes before protonation of the C6 carbon occurs to yield the final product. Many studies investigated the binding of a potent inhibitor of OMP decarboxylase, 6-hydroxy uridine monophosphate (BMP, a barbituric acid derivative), within the active site, to identify which essential amino acid residues are directly involved with stabilization of the transition state. (See figure of enzyme bound to BMP) Several mechanisms for enzymatic decarboxylation of OMP have been proposed, including protonation at O2 to form a zwitterionic species as an intermediate, anion stabilization of O4, or nucleophilic attack at C5. Current consensus suggests that the mechanism proceeds through a stabilized carbanion at the C6 after loss of carbon dioxide. This mechanism was suggested from studies investigating kinetic isotope effects in conjunction with competitive inhibition and active site mutagenesis. In this mechanism the short-lived carbanion species is stabilized by a nearby lysine residue, before it is quenched by a proton. (See schematic of catalytic mechanism) The intermediacy of a highly basic vinyl carbanion not benefiting from electronic stabilization is rare in an enzymatic system and in biological systems in general. Remarkably, the enzyme microenvironment helps stabilize the carbanion considerably. The pK_{aH} of the enzyme-bound carbanionic intermediate was measured to be less than or equal to 22 based on deuterium exchange studies. While still highly basic, the corresponding pK_{aH} of the free carbanionic intermediate is estimated to be much higher, around 30-34 (based on measurements on the analogous 1,3-dimethyluracil), leading to the conclusion that the enzyme stabilizes the carbanion by at least 14 kcal/mol.

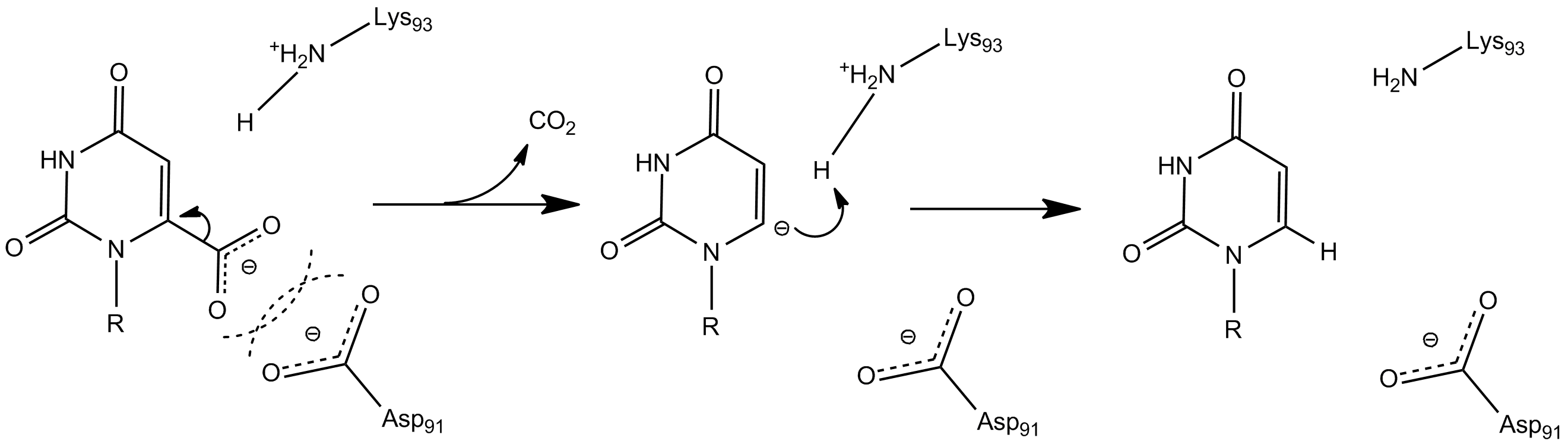
Reaction schematic showing the mechanism of OMP decarboxylase catalysis through a putative vinyl carbanion at the C6 position. This carbanion is likely stabilized by the nearby protonated lysine residue. The Lys93 and Asp91 residue numbering corresponds to the sequence for OMP decarboxylase from S. cerevisiae.

== Relation to UMP synthase ==
In yeast and bacteria, OMP decarboxylase is a single-function enzyme. However, in mammals, OMP decarboxylase is part of a single protein with two catalytic activities. This bifunctional enzyme is named UMP synthase and it also catalyzes the preceding reaction in pyrimidine nucleotide biosynthesis, the transfer of ribose 5-phosphate from 5-phosphoribosyl-1-pyrophosphate to orotate to form OMP. In organisms utilizing OMP decarboxylase, this reaction is catalyzed by orotate phosphoribosyltransferase.

== Importance in yeast genetics ==
Mutations in the gene encoding OMP decarboxylase in yeast (URA3) leads to auxotrophy in uracil. In addition, a function OMP decarboxylase renders yeast strains sensitive to the molecule 5-fluoroorotic acid (5-FOA). The establishment of the URA3 gene as a selection marker with both positive and negative selection strategies has made the controlled expression of OMP decarboxylase a significant laboratory tool for the investigation of yeast genetics.

== See also ==
- Circe effect
