= UDP-N-acetylglucosamine—lysosomal-enzyme N-acetylglucosaminephosphotransferase =

Class of enzymes

UDP-N-acetylglucosamine-lysosomal-enzyme N-acetylglucosaminephosphotransferase

Identifiers
- EC no.: 2.7.8.17
- CAS no.: 84012-69-1

Databases
- IntEnz: IntEnz view
- BRENDA: BRENDA entry
- ExPASy: NiceZyme view
- KEGG: KEGG entry
- MetaCyc: metabolic pathway
- PRIAM: profile
- PDB structures: RCSB PDB PDBe PDBsum
- Gene Ontology: AmiGO / QuickGO
Search
- PMC: articles
- PubMed: articles
- NCBI: proteins

In enzymology, an UDP-N-acetylglucosamine—lysosomal-enzyme N-acetylglucosaminephosphotransferase (EC 2.7.8.17) is an enzyme that catalyzes the chemical reaction

UDP-N-acetyl-D-glucosamine + lysosomal-enzyme D-mannose $\rightleftharpoons$ UMP + lysosomal-enzyme N-acetyl-D-glucosaminyl-phospho-D-mannose

Thus, the two substrates of this enzyme are UDP-N-acetyl-D-glucosamine and lysosomal-enzyme D-mannose, whereas its two products are UMP and lysosomal-enzyme N-acetyl-D-glucosaminyl-phospho-D-mannose.

This enzyme belongs to the family of transferases, specifically those transferring phosphorus-containing groups transferases for other substituted phosphate groups. The systematic name of this enzyme class is UDP-N-acetyl-D-glucosamine:lysosomal-enzyme N-acetylglucosaminephosphotransferase. Other names in common use include UDP-N-acetylglucosamine:lysosomal enzyme N-acetylglucosamine-1-phosphotransferase, UDP-GlcNAc:glycoprotein N-acetylglucosamine-1-phosphotransferase, uridine diphosphoacetylglucosamine-lysosomal enzyme precursor acetylglucosamine-1-phosphotransferase, uridine diphosphoacetylglucosamine-glycoprotein acetylglucosamine-1-phosphotransferase, lysosomal enzyme precursor acetylglucosamine-1-phosphotransferase, UDP-acetylglucosamine:lysosomal enzyme N-acetylglucosamine-1-phosphotransferase, UDP-GlcNAc:lysosomal enzyme N-acetylglucosamine-1-phosphotransferase, UDP-N-acetylglucosamine:glycoprotein N-acetylglucosamine-1-phosphotransferase, and UDP-N-acetylglucosamine:glycoprotein N-acetylglucosaminyl-1-phosphotransferase.
