= Nucleoside deoxyribosyltransferase =

Class of enzymes

nucleoside deoxyribosyltransferase
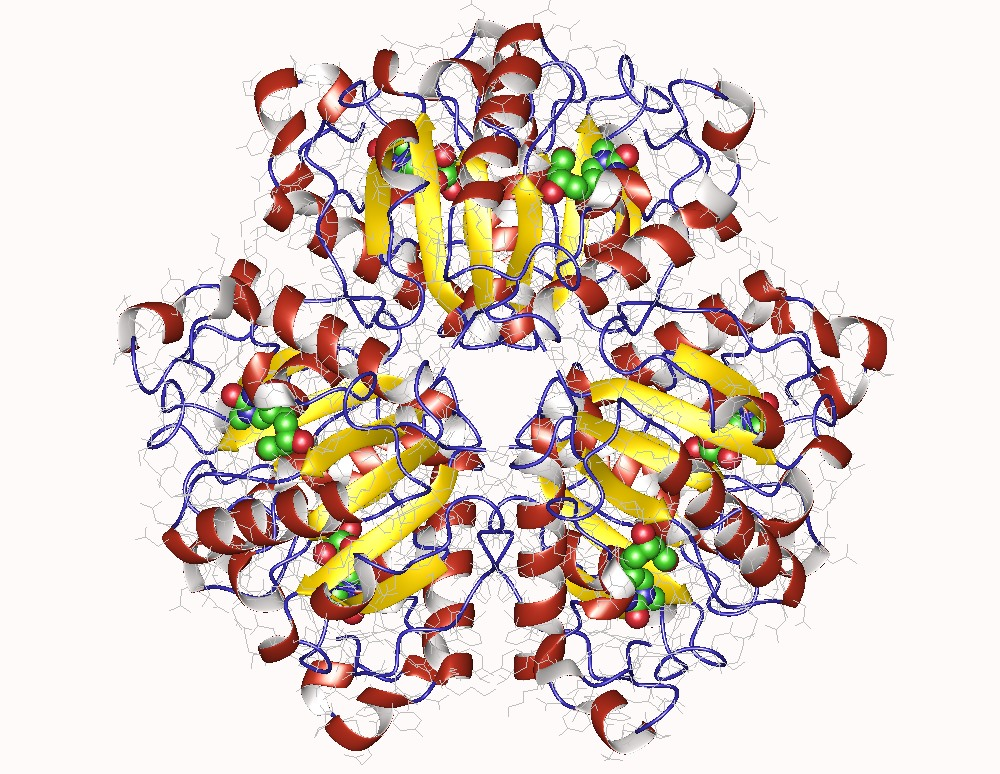
- Nucleoside 2-deoxyribosyltransferase homohexamer, Lactobacillus leichmannii

Identifiers
- EC no.: 2.4.2.6
- CAS no.: 9026-86-2

Databases
- IntEnz: IntEnz view
- BRENDA: BRENDA entry
- ExPASy: NiceZyme view
- KEGG: KEGG entry
- MetaCyc: metabolic pathway
- PRIAM: profile
- PDB structures: RCSB PDB PDBe PDBsum
- Gene Ontology: AmiGO / QuickGO
Search
- PMC: articles
- PubMed: articles
- NCBI: proteins

In enzymology, a nucleoside deoxyribosyltransferase (EC 2.4.2.6) is an enzyme that catalyzes the chemical reaction

2-deoxy-D-ribosyl-base_{1} + base_{2} $\rightleftharpoons$ 2-deoxy-D-ribosyl-base_{2} + base_{1}

Thus, the two substrates of this enzyme are 2-deoxy-D-ribosyl-base_{1} and base_{2}, whereas its two products are 2-deoxy-D-ribosyl-base_{2} and base_{1}.

This enzyme belongs to the family of glycosyltransferases, specifically the pentosyltransferases. The systematic name of this enzyme class is nucleoside:purine(pyrimidine) deoxy-D-ribosyltransferase. Other names in common use include purine(pyrimidine) nucleoside:purine(pyrimidine) deoxyribosyl, transferase, deoxyribose transferase, nucleoside trans-N-deoxyribosylase, trans-deoxyribosylase, trans-N-deoxyribosylase, trans-N-glycosidase, nucleoside deoxyribosyltransferase I (purine nucleoside:purine, deoxyribosyltransferase: strictly specific for transfer between, purine bases), nucleoside deoxyribosyltransferase II [purine(pyrimidine), and nucleoside:purine(pyrimidine) deoxyribosyltransferase]. This enzyme participates in pyrimidine metabolism.

== Structural studies ==
As of late 2007, 12 structures have been solved for this class of enzymes, with PDB accession codes 1F8X, 1F8Y, 1S2D, 1S2G, 1S2I, 1S2L, 1S3F, 2A0K, 2F2T, 2F62, 2F64, and 2F67.
