= UMP kinase =

Class of enzymes

Identifiers
- EC no.: 2.7.4.22
- CAS no.: 9036-23-1

Databases
- IntEnz: IntEnz view
- BRENDA: BRENDA entry
- ExPASy: NiceZyme view
- KEGG: KEGG entry
- MetaCyc: metabolic pathway
- PRIAM: profile
- PDB structures: RCSB PDB PDBe PDBsum
- Gene Ontology: AmiGO / QuickGO
Search
- PMC: articles
- PubMed: articles
- NCBI: proteins

UMP kinase (EC 2.7.4.22) is an enzyme that catalyzes the chemical reaction

uridine monophosphate
ATP
ADP
ATP
ADP
uridine diphosphate

The enzyme characterised from Escherichia coli and Pyrococcus furiosus converts the nucleotide, uridine monophosphate, to uridine diphosphate by transferring a phosphate group from the cofactor, adenosine triphosphate (ATP), which is converted to adenosine diphosphate (ADP).

== Nomenclature ==
The enzyme is a transferase, specifically one transferring phosphorus-containing groups (phosphotransferases) with a phosphate group as acceptor. The systematic name of this enzyme class is ATP:UMP phosphotransferase. Other names in common use include uridylate kinase, UMPK, uridine monophosphate kinase, PyrH, UMP-kinase, and SmbA.

== Structural studies ==
As of March 2010, 19 structures have been solved for this class of enzymes, and are deposited in the Protein Data Bank. All have a 3-layer (aba) sandwich) architecture (CATH code 3.40.1160.10). These include accession codes PDB: 2J4J, PDB: 2J4K, PDB: 2J4L, and PDB: 2VA1.

Search for all UMP Kinases in the PDB using the enzyme Browser at PDBe. (input the EC number)
