= UDP-sugar diphosphatase =

Class of enzymes

Identifiers
- EC no.: 3.6.1.45
- CAS no.: 57127-20-5

Databases
- BRENDA: enzyme data
- ExPASy: NiceZyme view
- KEGG: enzyme entry
- MetaCyc: metabolic pathway
- Rhea: reactions
- PDB structures: RCSB PDB PDBe PDBsum
- Gene Ontology: AmiGO / QuickGO
Search
- PMC: articles
- PubMed: articles
- NCBI: proteins

UDP-sugar diphosphatase (EC 3.6.1.45) is an enzyme characterised from Escherichia coli and Salmonella typhimurium that catalyzes a gereral hydrolysis reaction of uridine diphosphate (UDP) sugar derivatives:

UDP-sugar + H_{2}O $\rightleftharpoons$ UMP + alpha-D-aldose 1-phosphate

For example, the enzyme converts uridine diphosphate glucose to uridine monophosphate and glucose 1-phosphate:

uridine diphosphate glucose
H_{2}O
uridine monophosphate
+
glucose 1-phosphate

The enzyme has been a target of metabolic engineering to produce pseudouridine.

It is classified as a hydrolases, specifically one acting on acid anhydrides in phosphorus-containing anhydrides. The systematic name of this enzyme class is UDP-sugar sugarphosphohydrolase. Other names in use include nucleosidediphosphate-sugar pyrophosphatase, nucleosidediphosphate-sugar diphosphatase, UDP-sugar hydrolase, and UDP-sugar pyrophosphatase.

== Structural studies ==
As of late 2007, six structures have been solved for this class of enzymes, with PDB accession codes PDB: 1HO5, PDB: 1HP1, PDB: 1HPU, PDB: 1OI8, PDB: 1OID, and PDB: 1OIE.
