= UMPS =

UMPS may refer to:

- University of Moral and Political Sciences, now Thammasat University, a public research university in Thailand
- Uridine monophosphate synthetase, an enzyme encoded by the UMPS gene
