= UDP-glucose—glycoprotein glucose phosphotransferase =

Class of enzymes

UDP-glucose-glycoprotein glucose phosphotransferase

Identifiers
- EC no.: 2.7.8.19
- CAS no.: 84861-40-5

Databases
- IntEnz: IntEnz view
- BRENDA: BRENDA entry
- ExPASy: NiceZyme view
- KEGG: KEGG entry
- MetaCyc: metabolic pathway
- PRIAM: profile
- PDB structures: RCSB PDB PDBe PDBsum
- Gene Ontology: AmiGO / QuickGO
Search
- PMC: articles
- PubMed: articles
- NCBI: proteins

In enzymology, an UDP-glucose—glycoprotein glucose phosphotransferase (EC 2.7.8.19) is an enzyme that catalyzes the chemical reaction

UDP-glucose + glycoprotein D-mannose $\rightleftharpoons$ UMP + glycoprotein 6-(D-glucose-1-phospho)-D-mannose

Thus, the two substrates of this enzyme are UDP-glucose and glycoprotein D-mannose, whereas its two products are UMP and glycoprotein 6-(D-glucose-1-phospho)-D-mannose.

This enzyme belongs to the family of transferases, specifically those transferring non-standard substituted phosphate groups. The systematic name of this enzyme class is UDP-glucose:glycoprotein-D-mannose glucosephosphotransferase. Other names in common use include UDP-glucose:glycoprotein glucose-1-phosphotransferase, GlcPTase, Glc-phosphotransferase, and uridine diphosphoglucose-glycoprotein glucose-1-phosphotransferase.
