= TRNA-dihydrouridine20 synthase (NAD(P)+) =

Class of enzymes

DUS2

Identifiers
- Aliases: DUS2, DUS2L, SMM1, URLC8, dihydrouridine synthase 2
- External IDs: OMIM: 609707; MGI: 1913619; GeneCards: DUS2
Available structures
PDB	Ortholog search: PDBe RCSB
PDB	List of PDB id codes 4XP7, 4WFS, 4WFT
Enzyme activity
EC #	BRENDA	ExPASy	KEGG	MetaCyc
1.3.1.91	↗	↗	↗	↗

Gene location (Human)
Chr.	Chromosome 16 (human)
Band	16q22.1	Start	67,987,746 bp
Band	16q22.1	End	68,079,320 bp

Gene location (Mouse)
Chr.	Chromosome 8 (mouse)
Band	8|8 D3	Start	106,717,969 bp
Band	8|8 D3	End	106,780,472 bp
RNA expression pattern
Bgee	Human / Mouse (ortholog); Top expressed in: granulocyte; left testis; right testis; monocyte; pancreatic ductal cell; blood; spleen; gonad; lymph node; bone marrow cell / Top expressed in: otolith organ; utricle; hand; medial vestibular nucleus; spermatocyte; paraventricular nucleus of hypothalamus; inferior colliculi; neural layer of retina; globus pallidus; medial geniculate nucleus; More reference expression data
BioGPS	n/a
Gene ontology
Molecular function	oxidoreductase activity; double-stranded RNA binding; protein kinase inhibitor activity; protein binding; catalytic activity; flavin adenine dinucleotide binding; RNA binding; tRNA dihydrouridine synthase activity; FMN binding; NADPH binding; tRNA-dihydrouridine20 synthase activity
Cellular component	endoplasmic reticulum; cytoplasm; cytosol
Biological process	negative regulation of cell death; negative regulation of protein kinase activity; tRNA dihydrouridine synthesis; tRNA processing
Sources:Amigo / QuickGO
Orthologs
Databases	NCBI: entry; OMA: entry
Species	Human	Mouse
Entrez	54920	66369
Ensembl	ENSG00000167264	ENSMUSG00000031901
UniProt	Q9NX74	Q9D7B1
RefSeq (mRNA)	NM_017803; NM_001271762; NM_001271763	NM_001301176; NM_025518
RefSeq (protein)	NP_001258691; NP_001258692; NP_060273	NP_001288105; NP_079794
Location (UCSC)	Chr 16: 67.99 – 68.08 Mb	Chr 8: 106.72 – 106.78 Mb
PubMed search
- Wikidata
View/Edit Human	View/Edit Mouse

TRNA-dihydrouridine20 synthase (NAD(P)^{+}) (EC 1.3.1.91, Dus2p, tRNA-dihydrouridine synthase 2) is an enzyme with systematic name tRNA-5,6-dihydrouracil20:NAD(P)^{+} oxidoreductase. This enzyme catalyses the following chemical reaction

5,6-dihydrouracil20 in tRNA + NAD(P)^{+} $\rightleftharpoons$ uracil20 in tRNA + NAD(P)H + H^{+}

This enzyme specifically modifies uracil20 in tRNA.
