= Orotate reductase (NADPH) =

Enzyme class

orotate reductase (NADPH)

Identifiers
- EC no.: 1.3.1.15
- CAS no.: 37255-27-9

Databases
- BRENDA: enzyme data
- ExPASy: NiceZyme view
- KEGG: enzyme entry
- MetaCyc: metabolic pathway
- Rhea: reactions
- PDB structures: RCSB PDB PDBe PDBsum
- Gene Ontology: AmiGO / QuickGO
Search
- PMC: articles
- PubMed: articles
- NCBI: proteins

In enzymology, orotate reductase (NADPH) (EC 1.3.1.15) is an enzyme that catalyzes the chemical reaction

(S)-hydroorotic acid
+ NADP^{+}
H^{+}
H^{+}
orotic acid
+ NADPH

The two substrates of this enzyme are (S)-dihydroorotic acid and oxidised nicotinamide adenine dinucleotide phosphate (NADP^{+}). Its products are orotic acid, reduced NADPH, and a proton.

This enzyme belongs to the family of oxidoreductases, specifically those acting on the CH-CH group of donor with NAD+ or NADP+ as acceptor. The systematic name of this enzyme class is (S)-dihydroorotate:NADP+ oxidoreductase. Other names in common use include orotate reductase, dihydroorotate dehydrogenase, dihydro-orotic dehydrogenase, L-5,6-dihydro-orotate:NAD+ oxidoreductase, and orotate reductase (NADPH). It has one cofactor, FAD.
