= TRNA (5-methylaminomethyl-2-thiouridylate)-methyltransferase =

tRNA (5-methylaminomethyl-2-thiouridylate)-methyltransferase

Identifiers
- EC no.: 2.1.1.61
- CAS no.: 39391-17-8

Databases
- IntEnz: IntEnz view
- BRENDA: BRENDA entry
- ExPASy: NiceZyme view
- KEGG: KEGG entry
- MetaCyc: metabolic pathway
- PRIAM: profile
- PDB structures: RCSB PDB PDBe PDBsum
- Gene Ontology: AmiGO / QuickGO
Search
- PMC: articles
- PubMed: articles
- NCBI: proteins

In enzymology, a tRNA (5-methylaminomethyl-2-thiouridylate)-methyltransferase (EC 2.1.1.61) is an enzyme that catalyzes the chemical reaction

S-adenosyl-L-methionine + tRNA $\rightleftharpoons$ S-adenosyl-L-homocysteine + tRNA containing 5-methylaminomethyl-2-thiouridylate

Thus, the two substrates of this enzyme are S-adenosyl methionine and tRNA, whereas its two products are S-adenosylhomocysteine and tRNA containing 5-methylaminomethyl-2-thiouridylic acid.

This enzyme belongs to the family of transferases, specifically those transferring one-carbon group methyltransferases. The systematic name of this enzyme class is S-adenosyl-L-methionine:tRNA (5-methylaminomethyl-2-thio-uridylate)-methyltransferase. Other names in common use include transfer ribonucleate 5-methylaminomethyl-2-thiouridylate, 5-methyltransferase, and tRNA 5-methylaminomethyl-2-thiouridylate 5'-methyltransferase.

== Structural studies ==
As of late 2007, 4 structures have been solved for this class of enzymes, with PDB accession codes 2DER, 2DET, 2DEU, and 2HMA.
