= William Jencks =

American biochemist (1927–2007)

William Platt Jencks ForMemRS
- Born: August 15, 1927; Bar Harbor, Maine
- Died: January 3, 2007 (aged 79)
- Education: Harvard College
- Known for: Chemical mechanisms of enzyme catalysis, his book Catalysis in Chemistry and Enzymology
- Awards: Eli Lilly Award in Biological Chemistry of the American Chemical Society, American Society of Biological Chemists Award, James Flack Norris Award in Physical Organic Chemistry of the American Chemical Society, Repligen Corporation Award in Chemistry of Biological Processes of the American Chemical Society
- Scientific career
- Fields: Biochemistry
- Workplaces: Peter Bent Brigham hospital, Walter Reed Army Medical Center, Brandeis University

William Platt Jencks (August 15, 1927 – January 3, 2007) was an American biochemist. He was noted particularly for his work on enzymes, using concepts drawn from organic chemistry to understand their mechanisms.

== Career ==
Jencks graduated from Harvard College in 1947 with a degree in English, and earned a Doctor of Medicine from Harvard University in 1951. He interned at the Peter Bent Brigham hospital. Jencks conducted his first postdoctoral research for two years with Fritz Lipmann at Harvard Medical School. Jencks was drafted into the Army Medical Corps and was assigned to the Army Medical Service Graduate School at Walter Reed Medical Center in Washington, DC. He worked with E. L. Durrum and served as the chair of the department of pharmacology. In 1956–1957, he did a second Public Health Service postdoc with R. B. Woodward of the Harvard University Department of Chemistry. In 1957, he moved to the new graduate program in biochemistry at Brandeis University. He became professor emeritus in 1996.

Much of his career focused on reaction mechanisms used by enzyme catalysts. He was particularly well known for studies of the reaction of nucleophiles with carbon. He proposed that enzymes use ground state destabilization, termed the Circe Effect, to increase the reactivity of their bound substrates. In this work he proposed the frequently misunderstood concept of one-way enzymes — enzymes that are more effective catalysts in one direction than in the other. Many of these research interests were explored in his influential text Catalysis in Chemistry and Enzymology. Jencks published close to 400 scientific papers during his career.

Jencks was a co-founder of the biannual Winter Enzyme Mechanisms Conference. He was memorialized at the 20th Enzyme Mechanisms Meeting in St. Pete Beach, Florida, several days after his death.

== Honors and awards ==
Jencks was a recipient of the 1962 American Chemical Society Eli Lilly Award in Biological Chemistry, the 1993 American Society of Biological Chemists Award, the 1995 American Chemical Society James Flack Norris Award in Physical Organic Chemistry, and the 1996 American Chemical Society Repligen Corporation Award in Chemistry of Biological Processes. He was elected to the National Academy of Sciences in 1971. Jencks was also a foreign member of the Royal Society and a member of the American Philosophical Society.

== Personal life ==
Jencks's father, Gardner Platt Jencks, was a pianist and composer. Jencks attended the Calvert School, and completed high school from St. Paul's School near Baltimore. After his first year at medical school, he did research with George Wald at the Marine Biological Laboratory at Woods Hole on lobster shell pigments. At Woods Hole, he met his future wife, Miriam Ehrlich. Jencks was survived by Miriam, his wife of 56 years, children Sara and David, grandson Benjamin, and siblings Charles Jencks (b. 1939) a landscape architect, Penelope Jencks-Hurwitz, and John Cheetham.

== Selected bibliography ==
- Jencks, W. P. (1994). "Reaction mechanisms, catalysis, and movement". Protein Science. 3 (12): 2459–2464. doi:10.1002/pro.5560031232. PMC 2142781. PMID 7757002.
- Jencks, William P. (1969). Catalysis in chemistry and enzymology. McGraw-Hill series in advanced chemistry. New York: McGraw-Hill.
