= Circe effect =

Chemistry and biochemistry phenomenon

The Circe effect is a phenomenon proposed by William Jencks seen in chemistry and biochemistry where in order to speed up a reaction, the ground state of the substrate is destabilized by an enzyme.

== Mechanism ==
Highly favourable binding of a substrate at a non-reactive site will force the reactive site of the substrate to be more reactive by putting it in a very unfavourable position. This effect was observed in orotidine 5‘-phosphate decarboxylase. This can occur by positioning a charged amino acid group next to the charged substrate thus destabilizing it, thus making the reaction occur faster. Furthermore, the substrate is put into an optimal position by the enzyme for the reaction to occur, thus decreasing the entropy greatly.

A corollary of the effect is to explain the existence of one-way enzymes that are much more effective catalysts for one direction of reaction than the other. For example, the limiting rate in the forward direction of the reaction catalyzed by methionine adenosyltransferase is about 2 × 10^{5} times higher than it is for the reverse reaction. This concept is frequently misunderstood: it does not imply any violation of thermodynamic principles. It is a kinetic effect, not a thermodynamic one, and the reaction always proceeds toward equilibrium, regardless of where the process starts. And when it is at equilibrium the rate is always zero.

== Etymology ==
This process was named after Circe in Homer's Odyssey, who lured men and turned them into pigs.
