= Uridine triacetate =

Chemical compound

Clinical data
- Trade names: Vistogard, Xuriden
- Other names: vistonuridine
- AHFS/Drugs.com: Monograph
- MedlinePlus: a616020
- License data: US DailyMed: Uridine%20triacetate
- Routes of administration: By mouth
- ATC code: A16AX13 (WHO)

Legal status
- Legal status: US: ℞-only

Pharmacokinetic data
- Metabolism: Pyrimidine catabolic pathway
- Onset of action: T_{max} = 2–3 hours
- Elimination half-life: 2–2.5 hours
- Excretion: Kidney

Identifiers
- IUPAC name: [(2R,3R,4R,5R)-3,4-diacetyloxy-5-(2,4-dioxopyrimidin-1-yl)oxolan-2-yl]methyl acetate
- CAS Number: 4105-38-8
- PubChem CID: 20058
- DrugBank: DB09144
- ChemSpider: 18897
- UNII: 2WP61F175M
- KEGG: D09985
- ChEBI: CHEBI:90914
- ChEMBL: ChEMBL2107381
- CompTox Dashboard (EPA): DTXSID70951914 DTXSID40961409, DTXSID70951914
- ECHA InfoCard: 100.021.710

Chemical and physical data
- Formula: C_{15}H_{18}N_{2}O_{9}
- Molar mass: 370.314 g·mol^{−1}
- 3D model (JSmol): Interactive image
- SMILES: CC(=O)OCC1C(C(C(O1)N2C=CC(=O)NC2=O)OC(=O)C)OC(=O)C
- InChI: InChI=1S/C15H18N2O9/c1-7(18)23-6-10-12(24-8(2)19)13(25-9(3)20)14(26-10)17-5-4-11(21)16-15(17)22/h4-5,10,12-14H,6H2,1-3H3,(H,16,21,22)/t10-,12-,13-,14-/m1/s1; Key:AUFUWRKPQLGTGF-FMKGYKFTSA-N

Uridine triacetate (INN), formerly known as vistonuridine, is an orally active tri-acetylated prodrug of uridine used:

- in the treatment of hereditary orotic aciduria (brand name Xuriden /ˈzʊərədɛn/ ZOOR-ə-den);
- to treat people following an overdose of chemotherapy drugs 5-fluorouracil (5-FU) or capecitabine regardless of the presence of symptoms, or who exhibit early-onset, severe or life-threatening toxicity affecting the cardiac or central nervous system, and/or early-onset, unusually severe adverse reactions (e.g., gastrointestinal toxicity and/or neutropenia) within 96 hours following the end of fluorouracil or capecitabine administration (brand name Vistogard).

Uridine triacetate was developed, manufactured and distributed by Wellstat Therapeutics. It was granted breakthrough therapy designation by the U.S. Food and Drug Administration (FDA) and approved for use in the United States in 2015.
