= Mericitabine =

Chemical compound

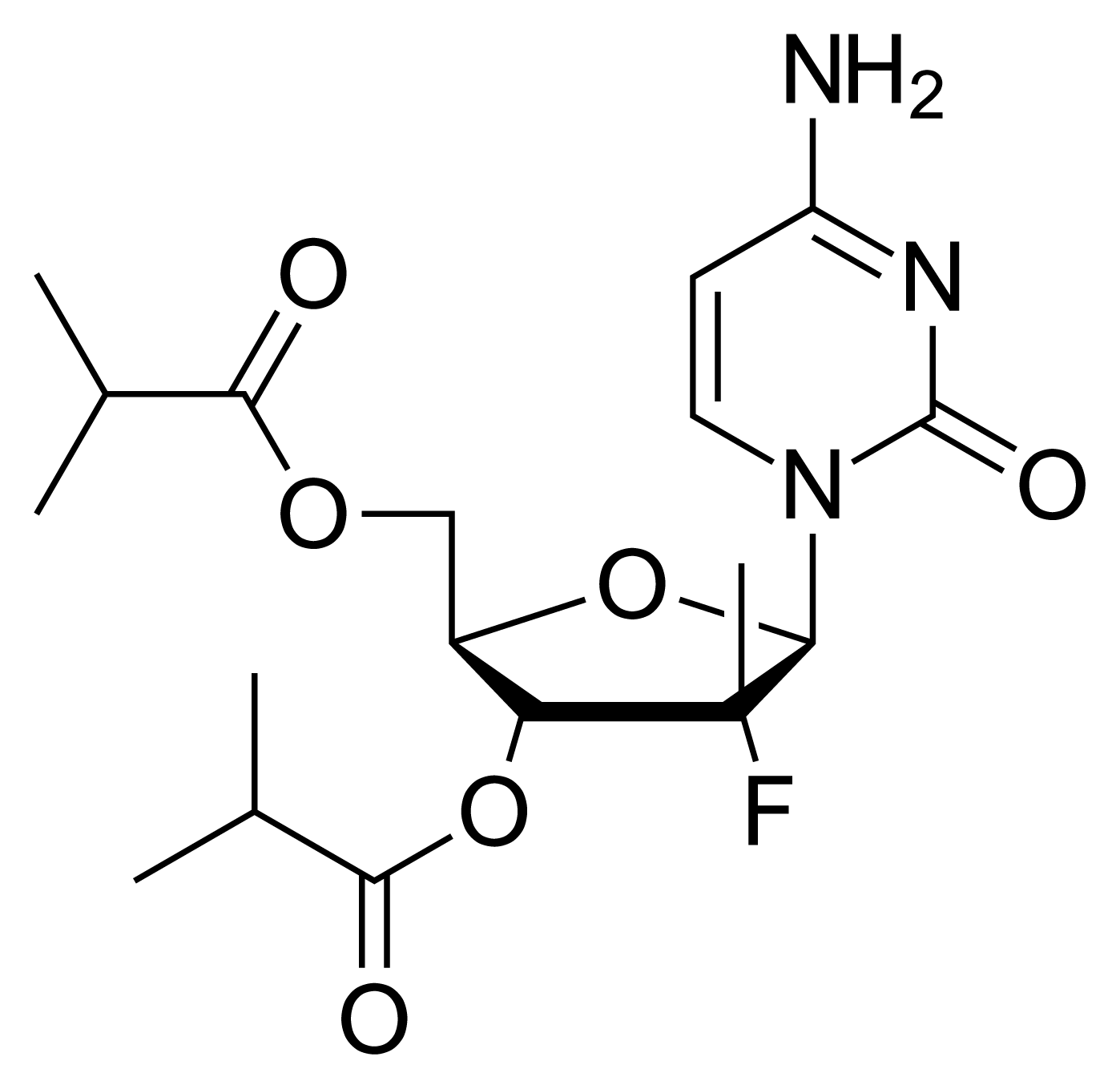

Clinical data
- Trade names: Mericitabine

Legal status
- Legal status: US: Investigational New Drug

Identifiers
- IUPAC name: [(2R,3R,4R,5R)-5-(4-amino-2-oxopyrimidin-1-yl)-4-fluoro-4-methyl-3-(2-methylpropanoyloxy)oxolan-2-yl]methyl 2-methylpropanoate
- CAS Number: 940908-79-2
- PubChem CID: 16122663
- ChemSpider: 17279576
- UNII: TA63JX8X52
- KEGG: D10477
- CompTox Dashboard (EPA): DTXSID201025655

Chemical and physical data
- Formula: C_{18}H_{26}FN_{3}O_{6}
- Molar mass: 399.419 g·mol^{−1}
- 3D model (JSmol): Interactive image
- SMILES: CC(C)C(=O)OC[C@@H]1[C@H]([C@@]([C@@H](O1)N2C=CC(=NC2=O)N)(C)F)OC(=O)C(C)C
- InChI: InChI=1S/C18H26FN3O6/c1-9(2)14(23)26-8-11-13(28-15(24)10(3)4)18(5,19)16(27-11)22-7-6-12(20)21-17(22)25/h6-7,9-11,13,16H,8H2,1-5H3,(H2,20,21,25)/t11-,13-,16-,18-/m1/s1; Key:MLESJYFEMSJZLZ-MAAOGQSESA-N

Mericitabine (RG-7128) is an antiviral drug, a deoxycytidine analog (a type of nucleoside analog). It was developed as a treatment for hepatitis C, acting as a NS5B RNA polymerase inhibitor, but while it showed a good safety profile in clinical trials, it was not sufficiently effective to be used as a stand-alone agent. However mericitabine has been shown to boost the efficacy of other antiviral drugs when used alongside them, and as most modern treatment regimens for hepatitis C use a combination therapy of several antiviral drugs, clinical trials have continued to see if it can form a part of a clinically useful drug treatment program.

== See also ==
- BCX4430
- MK-608
- NITD008
- Valopicitabine
