= 4,5-Dihydroorotic acid =

Names
- Preferred IUPAC name 2,6-Dioxo-1,3-diazinane-4-carboxylic acid

Identifiers
| CAS Number | 155-54-4; L-(S): 5988-19-2 |
| 3D model (JSmol) | Interactive image |
| ChEBI | CHEBI:30865 |
| ChEMBL | ChEMBL75782 |
| ChemSpider | 628 |
| MeSH | 4,5-dihydroorotic+acid |
| PubChem CID | 648 |
| UNII | 39LRK7UX5B |
| CompTox Dashboard (EPA) | DTXSID40861839 DTXSID10935112, DTXSID40861839 |
- InChI: InChI=1S/C5H6N2O4/c8-3-1-2(4(9)10)6-5(11)7-3/h2H,1H2,(H,9,10)(H2,6,7,8,11) Key: UFIVEPVSAGBUSI-UHFFFAOYSA-N; InChI=1/C5H6N2O4/c8-3-1-2(4(9)10)6-5(11)7-3/h2H,1H2,(H,9,10)(H2,6,7,8,11) Key: UFIVEPVSAGBUSI-UHFFFAOYAI
- SMILES: O=C1NC(=O)NC(C(=O)O)C1

Properties
| Chemical formula | C_{5}H_{6}N_{2}O_{4} |
| Molar mass | 158.113 g·mol^{−1} |

Hazards
- GHS labelling
| Hazard statements | H315, H319, H335 |
- Except where otherwise noted, data are given for materials in their standard state (at 25 °C [77 °F], 100 kPa). verify (what is ?) Infobox references

4,5-Dihydroorotic acid is a derivative of orotic acid which serves as an intermediate in pyrimidine biosynthesis.

== Biological role ==
4,5-Dihydroorotic acid is involved in pyrimidine biosynthesis. It is synthesized by the enzyme dihydroorotase, which cyclizes carbamoyl aspartic acid into 4,5-dihydroorotic acid.

4,5-Dihydroorotic acid acts as a substrate for dihydroorotate dehydrogenase (DHODH), which oxidizes it to form orotate (orotic acid).
