= Dihydroorotase =

Class of enzymes

carbamoyl-phosphate synthetase 2, aspartate transcarbamylase, and dihydroorotase
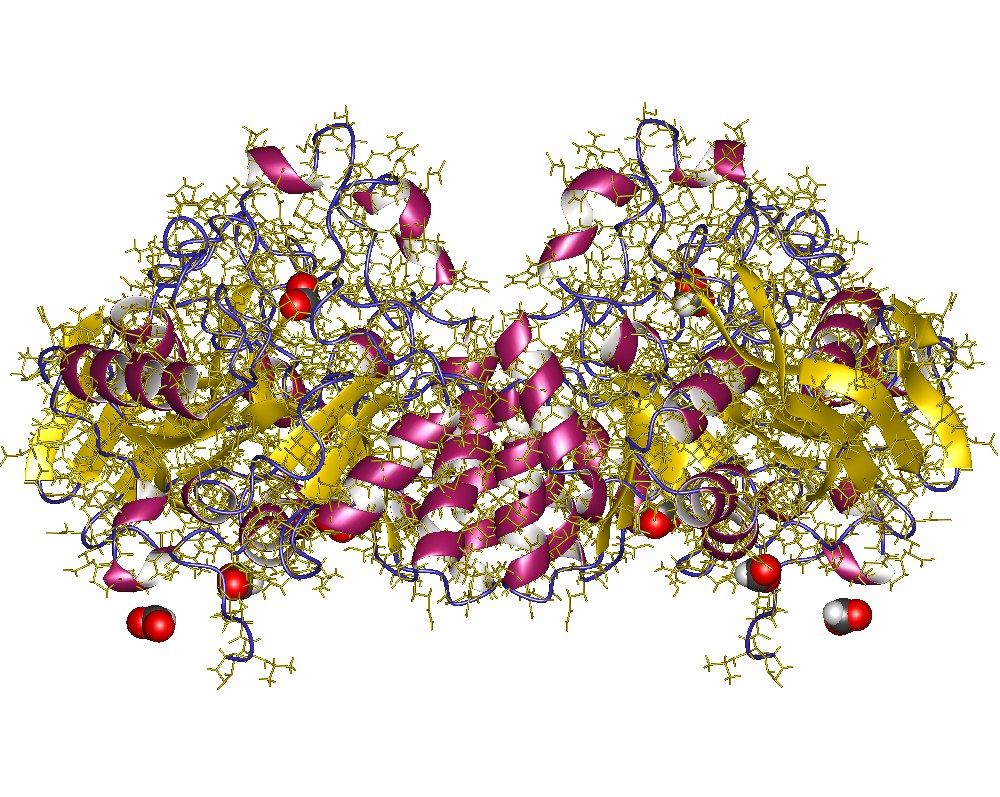
- Dihydroorotase (fragment) dimer, Human

Identifiers
- Symbol: CAD
- NCBI gene: 790
- HGNC: 1424
- OMIM: 114010
- RefSeq: NM_004341
- UniProt: P27708

Other data
- EC number: 3.5.2.3
- Locus: Chr. 2 p22-p21
Search for
- Structures: Swiss-model
- Domains: InterPro

Dihydroorotase (EC 3.5.2.3, carbamoylaspartic dehydrase, dihydroorotate hydrolase) is an enzyme which converts carbamoyl aspartic acid into 4,5-dihydroorotic acid in the biosynthesis of pyrimidines. It forms a multifunctional enzyme with carbamoyl phosphate synthetase and aspartate transcarbamoylase.

L-hydroorotic acid
H_{2}O
H_{2}O
N-carbamoyl-L-aspartic acid

The reaction is reversible and the active site has a hydroxide bridge held between the two zinc cations. This enzyme in pyrimidine biosynthesis has been suggested as a target for anti-malarial drugs.

== See also ==
- Pyrimidine biosynthesis
