= Orotidine 5′-monophosphate =

Names
- IUPAC name 2,6-Dioxo-3-(5-O-phosphono-β-D-ribofuranosyl)-1,2,3,6-tetrahydropyrimidine-4-carboxylic acid
- Systematic IUPAC name 3-{(2R,3R,4S,5R)-3,4-Dihydroxy-6-[(phosphonooxy)methyl]oxolan-2-yl}-2,6-dioxo-1,2,3,6-tetrahydropyrimidine-4-carboxylic acid
- Other names Orotidylic acid, OMP

Identifiers
CAS Number	2149-82-8
3D model (JSmol)	Interactive image
ChemSpider	141140
MeSH	Orotidine+5'-monophosphate
PubChem CID	160617
UNII	H0ARN8U4Y9
CompTox Dashboard (EPA)	DTXSID40944090
- InChI: InChI=1S/C10H13N2O11P/c13-5-1-3(9(16)17)12(10(18)11-5)8-7(15)6(14)4(23-8)2-22-24(19,20)21/h1,4,6-8,14-15H,2H2,(H,16,17)(H,11,13,18)(H2,19,20,21)/t4-,6-,7-,8-/m1/s1 Key: KYOBSHFOBAOFBF-XVFCMESISA-N; InChI=1/C10H13N2O11P/c13-5-1-3(9(16)17)12(10(18)11-5)8-7(15)6(14)4(23-8)2-22-24(19,20)21/h1,4,6-8,14-15H,2H2,(H,16,17)(H,11,13,18)(H2,19,20,21)/t4-,6-,7-,8-/m1/s1 Key: KYOBSHFOBAOFBF-XVFCMESIBC
- SMILES: c1c(n(c(=O)nc1O)[C@H]2[C@@H]([C@@H]([C@H](O2)COP(=O)(O)O)O)O)C(=O)O

Properties
Chemical formula	C_{10}H_{13}N_{2}O_{11}P
Molar mass	368.191 g/mol
- Except where otherwise noted, data are given for materials in their standard state (at 25 °C [77 °F], 100 kPa). verify (what is ?) Infobox references

Orotidine 5′-monophosphate (OMP), also known as orotidylic acid, is a pyrimidine nucleotide which is the last intermediate in the biosynthesis of uridine monophosphate. OMP is formed from orotate and phosphoribosyl pyrophosphate by the enzyme orotate phosphoribosyltransferase.

In humans, the enzyme UMP synthase converts OMP into uridine 5′-monophosphate. If UMP synthase is defective, orotic aciduria can result.
