= Uracil =

Chemical compound of RNA

- Structural formula of uracil

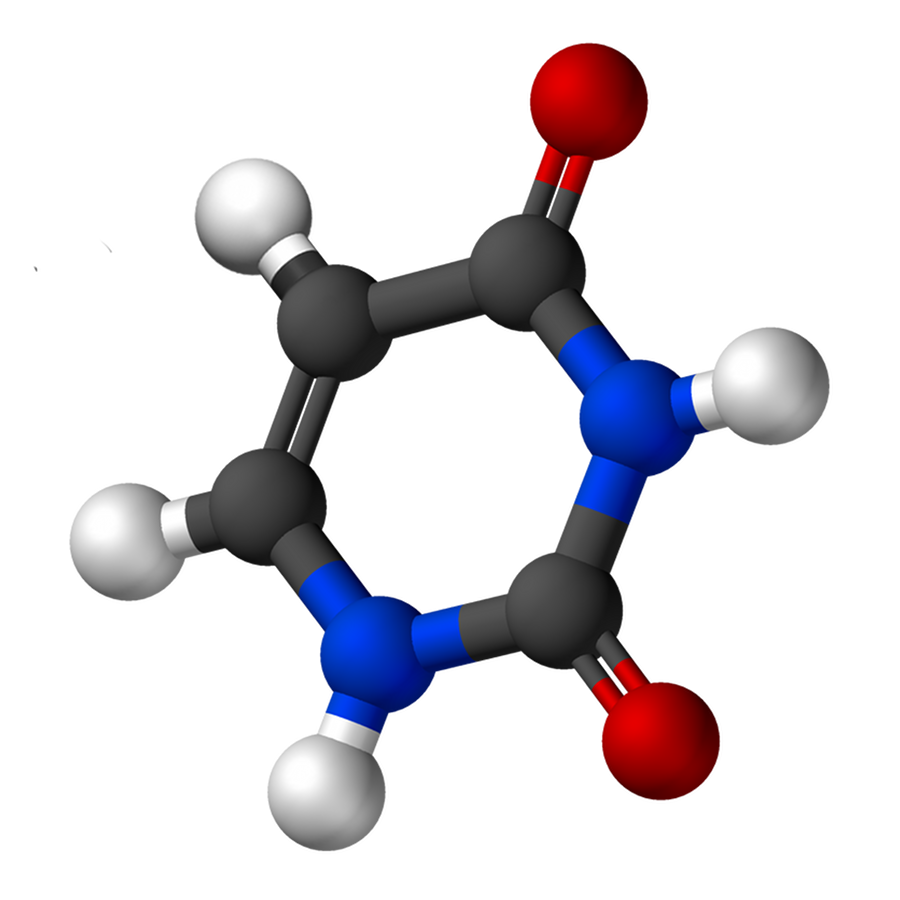
Ball-and-stick model of uracil
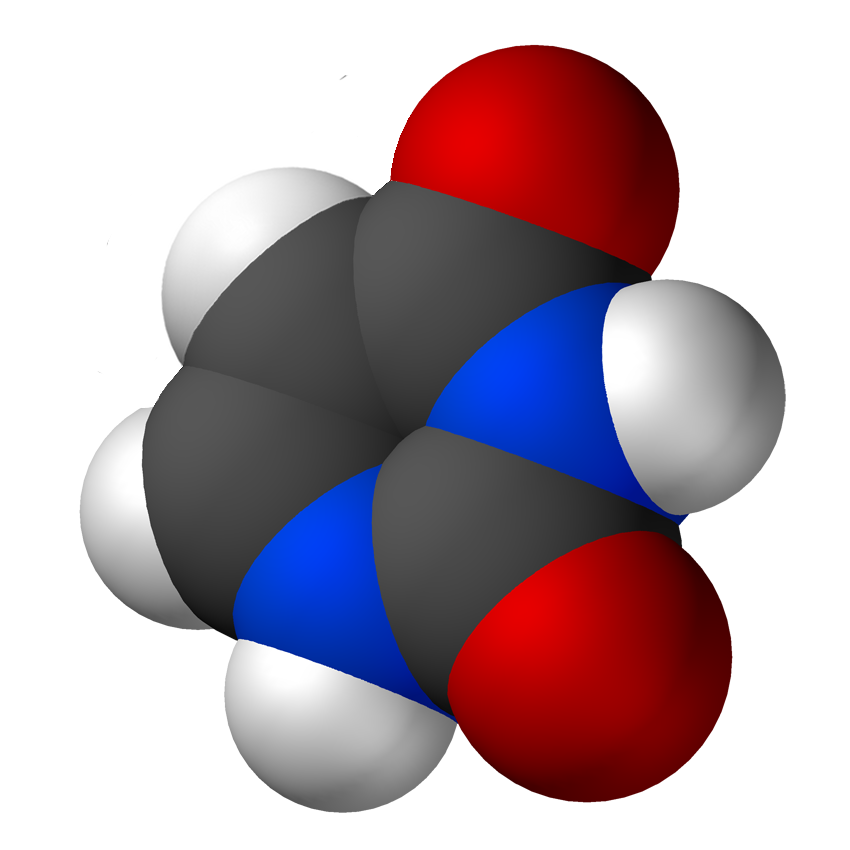
Space-filling model of uracil

Names
- Preferred IUPAC name Pyrimidine-2,4(1H,3H)-dione
- Other names: 2-Oxy-4-oxypyrimidine; 2,4(1H,3H)-Pyrimidinedione; 2,4-Dihydroxypyrimidine; 2,4-Pyrimidinediol

Identifiers
CAS Number	66-22-8
3D model (JSmol)	lactam form: Interactive image; lactim form: Interactive image
Beilstein Reference	606623
ChEBI	CHEBI:17568
ChEMBL	ChEMBL566
ChemSpider	1141
DrugBank	DB03419
ECHA InfoCard	100.000.565
EC Number	200-621-9
Gmelin Reference	2896
IUPHAR/BPS	4560
KEGG	C00106
PubChem CID	1174
RTECS number	YQ8650000
UNII	56HH86ZVCT
CompTox Dashboard (EPA)	DTXSID4021424
- InChI: InChI=1S/C4H4N2O2/c7-3-1-2-5-4(8)6-3/h1-2H,(H2,5,6,7,8) Key: ISAKRJDGNUQOIC-UHFFFAOYSA-N
- SMILES: lactam form: O=C1C=CNC(=O)N1; lactim form: Oc1nccc(O)n1

Properties
Chemical formula	C_{4}H_{4}N_{2}O_{2}
Molar mass	112.08676 g/mol
Appearance	Solid
Density	1.32 g/cm^{3}
Melting point	335 °C (635 °F; 608 K)
Boiling point	N/A – decomposes
Solubility in water	Soluble

Hazards
- Occupational safety and health (OHS/OSH)
Main hazards	carcinogen and teratogen with chronic exposure
- GHS labelling
Pictograms	(GHS07: Exclamation mark) (GHS08: Health hazard)
Signal word	Warning
Hazard statements	H315, H319, H335, H361
Precautionary statements	P201, P202, P261, P264, P271, P280, P281, P302+P352, P304+P340, P305+P351+P338, P308+P313, P312, P321, P332+P313, P337+P313, P362, P403+P233, P405, P501
NFPA 704 (fire diamond)	1 1
Flash point	Non-flammable

Related compounds
Related compounds	Thymine; Cytosine
- Except where otherwise noted, data are given for materials in their standard state (at 25 °C [77 °F], 100 kPa). verify (what is ?) Infobox references

Uracil (/ˈjʊərəsɪl/) (symbol U or Ura) is one of the four nucleobases in the nucleic acid RNA. The others are adenine (A), cytosine (C), and guanine (G). In RNA, uracil binds to adenine via two hydrogen bonds. In DNA, the uracil nucleobase is replaced by thymine (T). Uracil is a demethylated form of thymine.

Uracil is a common and naturally occurring pyrimidine derivative. The name "uracil" was coined in 1885 by the German chemist Robert Behrend, who was attempting to synthesize derivatives of uric acid. Originally discovered in 1900 by Alberto Ascoli, it was isolated by hydrolysis of yeast nuclein; it was also found in bovine thymus and spleen, herring sperm, and wheat germ. It is a planar, unsaturated compound that has the ability to absorb light.

Uracil that was formed extraterrestrially has been detected in the Murchison meteorite, in near-Earth asteroid Ryugu, and possibly on the surface of the moon Titan. It has been synthesized under cold laboratory conditions similar to outer space, from pyrimidine embedded in water ice and exposed to ultraviolet light.

== Properties ==
In RNA, uracil base-pairs with adenine and replaces thymine during DNA transcription. Methylation of uracil produces thymine. In DNA, the evolutionary substitution of thymine for uracil may have increased DNA stability and improved the efficiency of DNA replication (discussed below). Uracil pairs with adenine through hydrogen bonding. When base pairing with adenine, uracil acts as both a hydrogen bond acceptor and a hydrogen bond donor. In RNA, uracil binds with a ribose sugar to form the ribonucleoside uridine. When a phosphate attaches to uridine, uridine 5′-monophosphate is produced.

Uracil undergoes amide-imidic acid tautomeric shifts because any nuclear instability the molecule may have from the lack of formal aromaticity is compensated by the cyclic-amidic stability. The amide tautomer is referred to as the lactam structure, while the imidic acid tautomer is referred to as the lactim structure. These tautomeric forms are predominant at pH 7. The lactam structure is the most common form of uracil.

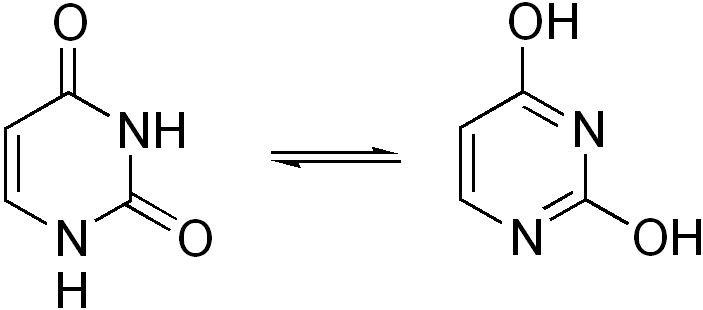
Uracil tautomers: Amide or lactam structure (left) and imide or lactim structure (right)

Uracil also recycles itself to form nucleotides by undergoing a series of phosphoribosyltransferase reactions. Degradation of uracil produces the substrates β-alanine, carbon dioxide, and ammonia.

C_{4}H_{4}N_{2}O_{2}→ H_{3}NCH_{2}CH_{2}COO^{−} + NH^{+}_{4} + CO_{2}

Oxidative degradation of uracil produces urea and maleic acid in the presence of H_{2}O_{2} and Fe^{2+} or in the presence of diatomic oxygen and Fe^{2+}.

Uracil is a weak acid. The first site of ionization of uracil is not known. The negative charge is placed on the oxygen anion and produces a pK_{a} of less than or equal to 12. The basic pK_{a} = −3.4, while the acidic pK_{a} = 9.38_{9}. In the gas phase, uracil has four sites that are more acidic than water.

=== In DNA ===
Uracil is rarely found in DNA, and this may have been an evolutionary change to increase genetic stability. This is because cytosine can deaminate spontaneously to produce uracil through hydrolytic deamination. Therefore, if there were an organism that used uracil in its DNA, the deamination of cytosine (which undergoes base pairing with guanine) would lead to formation of uracil (which would base pair with adenine) during DNA synthesis. Uracil-DNA glycosylase excises uracil bases from double-stranded DNA. This enzyme would therefore recognize and cut out both types of uracil – the one incorporated naturally, and the one formed due to cytosine deamination, which would trigger unnecessary and inappropriate repair processes.

This problem is believed to have been solved in terms of evolution, that is by "tagging" (methylating) uracil. Methylated uracil is identical to thymine. Hence the hypothesis that, over time, thymine became standard in DNA instead of uracil. So cells continue to use uracil in RNA, and not in DNA, because RNA is shorter-lived than DNA, and any potential uracil-related errors do not lead to lasting damage. Apparently, either there was no evolutionary pressure to replace uracil in RNA with the more complex thymine, or uracil has some chemical property that is useful in RNA, which thymine lacks. Uracil-containing DNA still exists, for example in:

- DNA of several phages
- Endopterygote development
- Hypermutations during the synthesis of vertebrate antibodies.

== Synthesis ==
=== Biological ===
Organisms synthesize uracil, in the form of uridine monophosphate (UMP), by decarboxylating orotidine 5'-monophosphate (orotidylic acid). In humans this decarboxylation is achieved by the enzyme UMP synthase. In contrast to the purine nucleotides, the pyrimidine ring (orotidylic acid) that leads uracil is synthesized first and then linked to ribose phosphate, forming UMP.

=== Laboratory ===
There are many laboratory synthesis of uracil available. The first reaction is the simplest of the syntheses, by adding water to cytosine to produce uracil and ammonia:

C_{4}H_{5}N_{3}O + H_{2}O → C_{4}H_{4}N_{2}O_{2} + NH_{3}

The most common way to synthesize uracil is by the condensation of maleic acid with urea in fuming sulfuric acid:

C_{4}H_{4}O_{4} + NH_{2}CONH_{2} → C_{4}H_{4}N_{2}O_{2} + 2 H_{2}O + CO

Uracil can also be synthesized by a double decomposition of thiouracil in aqueous chloroacetic acid.

Photodehydrogenation of 5,6-diuracil, which is synthesized by beta-alanine reacting with urea, produces uracil.

=== Prebiotic ===
In 2009, NASA scientists reported having produced uracil from pyrimidine and water ice by exposing it to ultraviolet light under space-like conditions. This suggests a possible natural original source for uracil. In 2014, NASA scientists reported that additional complex DNA and RNA organic compounds of life, including uracil, cytosine and thymine, have been formed in the laboratory under outer space conditions, starting with ice, pyrimidine, ammonia, and methanol, which are compounds found in astrophysical environments. Pyrimidine, like polycyclic aromatic hydrocarbons (PAHs), a carbon-rich chemical found in the Universe, may have been formed in red giants or in interstellar dust and gas clouds.

Based on ^{12}C/^{13}C isotopic ratios of organic compounds found in the Murchison meteorite, it is believed that uracil, xanthine, and related molecules can also be formed extraterrestrially. Data from the Cassini mission, orbiting in the Saturn system, suggests that uracil is present on the surface of the moon Titan. In 2023, uracil was observed in a sample from 162173 Ryugu, a near-Earth asteroid, with no exposure to Earth's biosphere, giving further evidence for synthesis in space.

== Reactions ==
Chemical structure of uridine

Uracil readily undergoes regular reactions including oxidation, nitration, and alkylation. While in the presence of phenol (PhOH) and sodium hypochlorite (NaOCl), uracil can be visualized in ultraviolet light. Uracil also has the capability to react with elemental halogens because of the presence of more than one strongly electron donating group.

Uracil readily undergoes addition to ribose sugars and phosphates to partake in synthesis and further reactions in the body. Uracil becomes uridine, uridine monophosphate (UMP), uridine diphosphate (UDP), uridine triphosphate (UTP), and uridine diphosphate glucose (UDP-glucose). Each one of these molecules is synthesized in the body and has specific functions.

When uracil reacts with anhydrous hydrazine, a first-order kinetic reaction occurs and the uracil ring opens up. If the pH of the reaction increases to > 10.5, the uracil anion forms, making the reaction go much more slowly. The same slowing of the reaction occurs if the pH decreases, because of the protonation of the hydrazine. The reactivity of uracil remains unchanged, even if the temperature changes.

== Uses ==
Uracil's use in the body is to help carry out the synthesis of many enzymes necessary for cell function through bonding with riboses and phosphates. Uracil serves as allosteric regulator and coenzyme for reactions in animals and in plants. UMP controls the activity of carbamoyl phosphate synthetase and aspartate transcarbamoylase in plants, while UDP and UTP regulate CPSase II activity in animals. UDP-glucose regulates the conversion of glucose to galactose in the liver and other tissues in the process of carbohydrate metabolism. Uracil is also involved in the biosynthesis of polysaccharides and the transportation of sugars containing aldehydes. Uracil is important for the detoxification of many carcinogens, for instance those found in tobacco smoke. Uracil is also required to detoxify many drugs such as cannabinoids (THC) and morphine (opioids). It can also slightly increase the risk for cancer in unusual cases in which the body is extremely deficient in folate. The deficiency in folate leads to increased ratio of deoxyuridine monophosphates (dUMP)/deoxythymidine monophosphates (dTMP) and uracil misincorporation into DNA and eventually low production of DNA.

Uracil can be used for drug delivery and as a pharmaceutical. When elemental fluorine reacts with uracil, they produce 5-fluorouracil. 5-Fluorouracil is an anticancer drug (antimetabolite) used to masquerade as uracil during the nucleic acid replication process. Because 5-fluorouracil is similar in shape to, but does not undergo the same chemistry as, uracil, the drug inhibits RNA transcription enzymes, thereby blocking RNA synthesis and stopping the growth of cancerous cells. Uracil can also be used in the synthesis of caffeine. Uracil has also shown potential as a HIV viral capsid inhibitor. Uracil derivatives have antiviral, anti-tubercular and anti-leishmanial activity.

Uracil can be used to determine microbial contamination of tomatoes. The presence of uracil indicates lactic acid bacteria contamination of the fruit. Uracil derivatives containing a diazine ring are used in pesticides. Uracil derivatives are more often used as antiphotosynthetic herbicides, destroying weeds in cotton, sugar beet, turnips, soya, peas, sunflower crops, vineyards, berry plantations, and orchards. Uracil derivatives can enhance the activity of antimicrobial polysaccharides such as chitosan.

In yeast, uracil concentrations are inversely proportional to uracil permease.

Mixtures containing uracil are also commonly used to test reversed-phase HPLC columns. As uracil is essentially unretained by the non-polar stationary phase, this can be used to determine the dwell time (and subsequently dwell volume, given a known flow rate) of the system.
