= Orotic acid =

Chemical compound synthesized in the body via a mitochondrial enzyme

Clinical data
- Other names: uracil-6-carboxylic acid
- AHFS/Drugs.com: International Drug Names
- ATC code: none

Identifiers
- IUPAC name: 2,4-Dioxo-1H-pyrimidine-6-carboxylic acid
- CAS Number: 65-86-1
- PubChem CID: 967
- IUPHAR/BPS: 4690
- DrugBank: DB02262
- ChemSpider: 942
- UNII: 61H4T033E5
- KEGG: C00295
- CompTox Dashboard (EPA): DTXSID0025814
- ECHA InfoCard: 100.000.563

Chemical and physical data
- Formula: C_{5}H_{4}N_{2}O_{4}
- Molar mass: 156.097 g·mol^{−1}
- 3D model (JSmol): Interactive image
- SMILES: O=C(O)\C1=C\C(=O)NC(=O)N1
- InChI: InChI=1S/C5H4N2O4/c8-3-1-2(4(9)10)6-5(11)7-3/h1H,(H,9,10)(H2,6,7,8,11); Key:PXQPEWDEAKTCGB-UHFFFAOYSA-N

Orotic acid (/ɔːˈrɒtɪk/) is a pyrimidinedione and a carboxylic acid. Historically, it was believed to be part of the vitamin B complex and was called vitamin B_{13}, but it is now known that it is not a vitamin.

The compound is synthesized in the body via a mitochondrial enzyme, dihydroorotate dehydrogenase or a cytoplasmic enzyme of pyrimidine synthesis pathway. It is sometimes used as a mineral carrier in some dietary supplements (to increase their bioavailability), most commonly for lithium orotate.

== Synthesis ==
Dihydroorotate is synthesized to orotic acid by the enzyme dihydroorotate dehydrogenase, where it later combines with phosphoribosyl pyrophosphate (PRPP) to form orotidine-5′-monophosphate (OMP). A distinguishing characteristic of pyrimidine synthesis is that the pyrimidine ring is fully synthesized before being attached to the ribose sugar, whereas purine synthesis happens by building the base directly on the sugar.

== Chemistry ==
Orotic acid is a Bronsted acid and its conjugate base, the orotate anion, is able to bind to metals. Lithium orotate, for example, has been investigated for use in treating alcoholism, and complexes of cobalt, manganese, nickel, and zinc are known. The pentahydrate nickel orotate coordination complex converts into a polymeric trihydrate upon heating in water at 100 °C. Crystals of the trihydrate can be obtained by hydrothermal treatment of nickel(II) acetate and orotic acid. When the reactions are run with bidentate nitrogen ligands such as 2,2′-bipyridine present, other solids can be obtained.

== Pathology ==
A buildup of orotic acid can lead to orotic aciduria and acidemia. It may be a symptom of an increased ammonia load due to a metabolic disorder, such as a urea cycle disorder.

In ornithine transcarbamylase deficiency, an X-linked inherited and the most common urea cycle disorder, excess carbamoyl phosphate is converted into orotic acid. This leads to an increased serum ammonia level, increased serum and urinary orotic acid levels and a decreased serum blood urea nitrogen level. This also leads to an increased urinary orotic acid excretion, because the orotic acid is not being properly utilized and must be eliminated. The hyperammonemia depletes alpha-ketoglutarate leading to the inhibition of the tricarboxylic acid cycle (TCA) decreasing adenosine triphosphate (ATP) production.

Orotic aciduria is a cause of megaloblastic anaemia.

== Biochemistry ==
Orotic acid is a precursor to a RNA base, uracil. The breast milk of smokers has a higher concentration of orotic acid than that of a non smoking woman. It is reasoned that the smoking causes the pyrimidine biosynthesis process in the mother to be altered thus causing the orotic acid concentration to increase.

A modified orotic acid (5-fluoroorotic acid) is toxic to yeast. The mutant yeasts which are resistant to 5-fluoroorotic acid require a supply of uracil.

== See also ==
- Lithium orotate
- Magnesium orotate
- Pyrimidine biosynthesis
