= Uridine monophosphate =

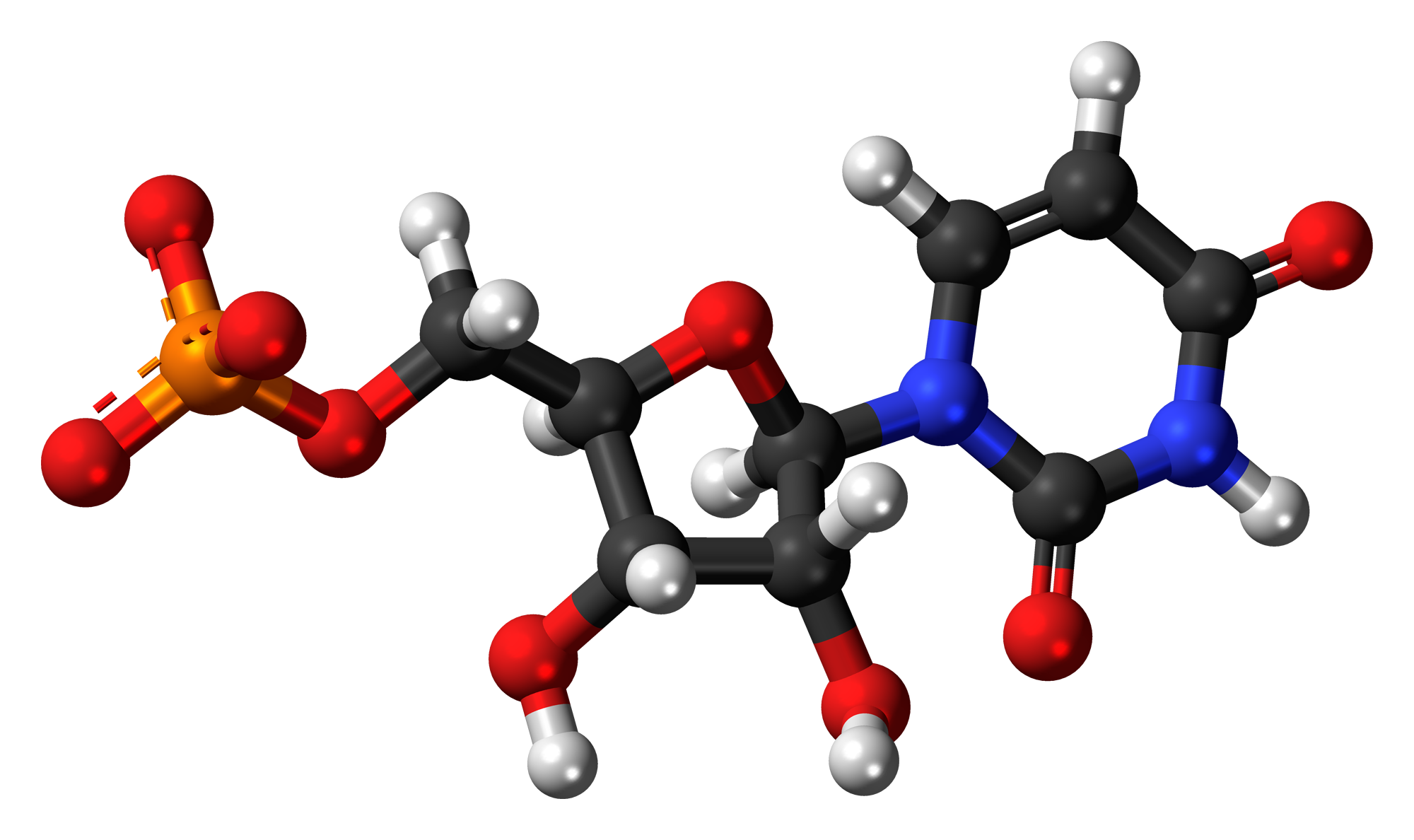

Names
- IUPAC name [(2R,3S,4R,5R)-5-(2,4-Dioxopyrimidin-1-yl)-3,4-dihydroxyoxolan-2-yl]methyl dihydrogen phosphate
- Other names Uridylic acid; Uridine 5'-monophosphate; 5'-Uridylic acid; Uridine 5'-phosphate; Uridine phosphate; 5'-UMP; Uridine 5'-phosphoric acid

Identifiers
CAS Number	58-97-9
3D model (JSmol)	Interactive image
ChemSpider	5808
ECHA InfoCard	100.000.371
IUPHAR/BPS	5125
MeSH	Uridine+monophosphate
PubChem CID	6030
UNII	E2OU15WN0N
CompTox Dashboard (EPA)	DTXSID40861596 DTXSID20883211, DTXSID40861596
- InChI: InChI=1S/C9H13N2O9P/c12-5-1-2-11(9(15)10-5)8-7(14)6(13)4(20-8)3-19-21(16,17)18/h1-2,4,6-8,13-14H,3H2,(H,10,12,15)(H2,16,17,18)/t4-,6-,7-,8-/m1/s1 Key: DJJCXFVJDGTHFX-XVFCMESISA-N; InChI=1/C9H13N2O9P/c12-5-1-2-11(9(15)10-5)8-7(14)6(13)4(20-8)3-19-21(16,17)18/h1-2,4,6-8,13-14H,3H2,(H,10,12,15)(H2,16,17,18)/t4-,6-,7-,8-/m1/s1 Key: DJJCXFVJDGTHFX-XVFCMESIBD
- SMILES: c1cn(c(=O)[nH]c1=O)[C@H]2[C@@H]([C@@H]([C@H](O2)COP(=O)(O)O)O)O

Properties
Chemical formula	C_{9}H_{13}N_{2}O_{9}P
Molar mass	324.182 g·mol^{−1}
Melting point	202 °C (396 °F; 475 K) (decomposes)
Solubility in water	good, also in methanol
Acidity (pK_{a})	1.0, 6.4, 9.5
- Except where otherwise noted, data are given for materials in their standard state (at 25 °C [77 °F], 100 kPa). verify (what is ?) Infobox references

Uridine monophosphate (UMP), also known as 5′-uridylic acid (conjugate base uridylate), is a nucleotide that is used as a monomer in RNA. It is an ester of phosphoric acid with the nucleoside uridine. UMP consists of the phosphate group, the pentose sugar ribose, and the nucleobase uracil; hence, it is a ribonucleotide monophosphate. As a substituent or radical its name takes the form of the prefix uridylyl-. The deoxy form is abbreviated dUMP. Covalent attachment of UMP (e.g., to a protein such as adenylyltransferase) is called uridylylation (or sometimes uridylation).

== Biosynthesis ==
Uridine monophosphate is formed from orotidine 5′-monophosphate (orotidylic acid) in a decarboxylation reaction catalyzed by the enzyme orotidylate decarboxylase. Uncatalyzed, the decarboxylation reaction is extremely slow (estimated to occur on average one time per 78 million years). Adequately catalyzed, the reaction takes place once per second, an increase of 10^{17}-fold.

In humans, the orotidylate decarboxylase function is carried out by the protein UMP synthase. Defective UMP synthase can result in orotic aciduria, a metabolic disorder.

== Effects on animal intelligence ==
In a study, gerbils fed a combination of uridine monophosphate, choline, and docosahexaenoic acid (DHA) were found to have significantly improved performance in running mazes over those not fed the supplements, implying an increase in cognitive function.

== In foods ==
In brain research studies, uridine monophosphate is used as a convenient delivery compound for uridine. Uridine is the active component of this compound. Uridine is present in many foods, mainly in the form of RNA. Non-phosphorylated uridine is not bioavailable beyond first-pass metabolism, as it is almost entirely catabolised in the liver and gastrointestinal tract.

== See also ==
- Nucleoside
- Nucleotide
- DNA
- RNA
- Oligonucleotide
- Pyrimidine biosynthesis
