= Somatic fusion =

Genetic modification fusing plants into a hybrid

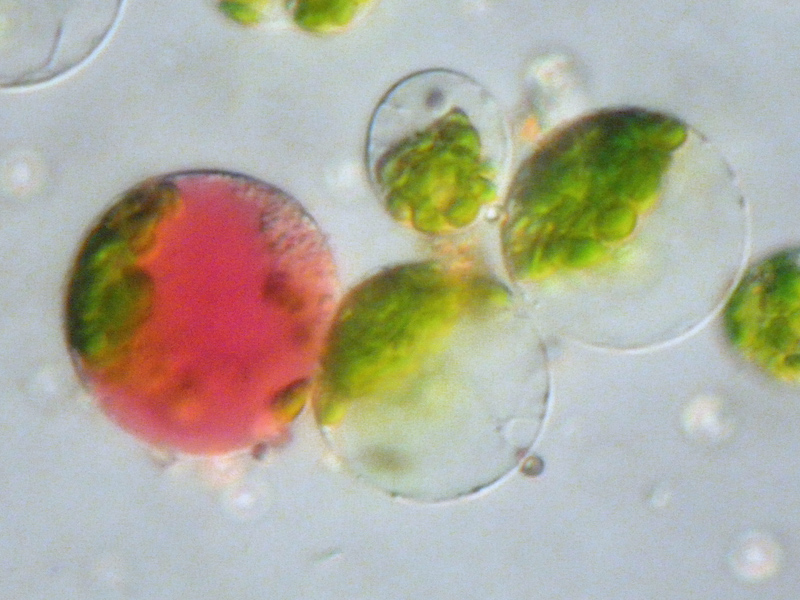
Fused protoplast (left) with chloroplasts (from a leaf cell) and coloured vacuole (from a petal)

Somatic fusion, also called protoplast fusion, is a type of genetic modification in plants by which two distinct species of plants are fused together to form a new hybrid plant with the characteristics of both, a somatic hybrid. Hybrids have been produced either between different varieties of the same species (e.g. between non-flowering potato plants and flowering potato plants) or between two different species (e.g. between wheat Triticum and rye Secale to produce Triticale).

Uses of somatic fusion include developing plants resistant to disease, such as making potato plants resistant to potato leaf roll disease. Through somatic fusion, the crop potato plant Solanum tuberosum – the yield of which is severely reduced by a viral disease transmitted on by the aphid vector – is fused with the wild, non-tuber-bearing potato Solanum brevidens, which is resistant to the disease. The resulting hybrid has the chromosomes of both plants and is thus similar to polyploid plants. Somatic hybridization was first introduced by Carlson et al. in Nicotiana glauca.

== Process for plant cells ==
The somatic fusion process occurs in four steps:

1. The removal of the cell wall of one cell of each type of plant using cellulase enzyme to produce a somatic cell called a protoplast
2. The cells are then fused using electric shock (electrofusion) or chemical treatment to join the cells and fuse together the nuclei. The resulting fused nucleus is called heterokaryon.
3. The formation of the cell wall is then induced using hormones
4. The cells are then grown into calluses which then are further grown to plantlets and finally to a full plant, known as a somatic hybrid.

The procedure for seed plants describe above, fusion of moss protoplasts can be initiated without electric shock but by the use of polyethylene glycol (PEG). Further, moss protoplasts do not need phytohormones for regeneration, and they do not form a callus. Instead, regenerating moss protoplasts behave like germinating moss spores. Of further note sodium nitrate and calcium ion at high pH can be used, although results are variable depending on the organism.

== Applications of hybrid cells ==
Somatic cells of different types can be fused to obtain hybrid cells. Hybrid cells are useful in a variety of ways, e.g.,

(i) to study the control of cell division and gene expression,
(ii) to investigate malignant transformations,
(iii) to obtain viral replication,
(iv) for gene or chromosome mapping and for
(v) production of monoclonal antibodies by producing hybridoma (hybrid cells between an immortalised cell and an antibody producing lymphocyte), etc.

Chromosome mapping through somatic cell hybridization is essentially based on fusion of human and mouse somatic cells. Generally, human fibrocytes or leucocytes are fused with mouse continuous cell lines.

When human and mouse cells (or cells of any two mammalian species or of the same species) are mixed, spontaneous cell fusion occurs at a very low rate (10-6). Cell fusion is enhanced 100 to 1000 times by the addition of ultraviolet inactivated Sendai (parainfluenza) virus or polyethylene glycol (PEG).

These agents adhere to the plasma membranes of cells and alter their properties in such a way that facilitates their fusion. Fusion of two cells produces a heterokaryon, i.e., a single hybrid cell with two nuclei, one from each of the cells entering fusion. Subsequently, the two nuclei also fuse to yield a hybrid cell with a single nucleus.

A generalized scheme for somatic cell hybridization may be described as follows. Appropriate human and mouse cells are selected and mixed together in the presence of inactivated Sendai virus or PEG to promote cell fusion. After a period of time, the cells (a mixture of man, mouse and 'hybrid' cells) are plated on a selective medium, e.g., HAT medium, which allows the multiplication of hybrid cells only.

Several clones (each derived from a single hybrid cell) of the hybrid cells are thus isolated and subjected to both cytogenetic and appropriate biochemical analyses for the detection of enzyme/ protein/trait under investigation. An attempt is now made to correlate the presence and absence of the trait with the presence and absence of a human chromosome in the hybrid clones.

If there is a perfect correlation between the presence and absence of a human chromosome and that of a trait in the hybrid clones, the gene governing the trait is taken to be located in the concerned chromosome.

The HAT medium is one of the several selective media used for the selection of hybrid cells. This medium is supplemented with hypoxanthine, aminopterin and thymidine, hence the name HAT medium. Antimetabolite aminopterin blocks the cellular biosynthesis of purines and pyrimidines from simple sugars and amino acids. However, normal human and mouse cells can still multiply as they can utilize hypoxanthine and thymidine present in the medium through a salvage pathway, which ordinarily recycles the purines and pyrimidines produced from degradation of nucleic acids. Hypoxanthine is converted into guanine by the enzyme hypoxanthine-guanine phosphoribosyltransferase (HGPRT), while thymidine is phosphorylated by thymidine kinase (TK); both HGPRT and TK are enzymes of the salvage pathway. On a HAT medium, only those cells that have active HGPRT (HGPRT+) and TK (TK+) enzymes can proliferate, while those deficient in these enzymes (HGPRr- and/or TK-) can not divide (since they cannot produce purines and pyrimidines due to the aminopterin present in the HAT medium). For using HAT medium as a selective agent, human cells used for fusion must be deficient for either the enzyme HGPRT or TK, while mouse cells must be deficient for the other enzyme of this pair. Thus, one may fuse HGPRT deficient human cells (designated as TK+ HGPRr-) with TK deficient mouse cells (denoted as TK- HGPRT+). Their fusion products (hybrid cells) will be TK+ (due to the human gene) and HGPRT+ (due to the mouse gene) and will multiply on the HAT medium, while the man and mouse cells will fail to do so. Experiments with other selective media can be planned in a similar fashion.

== Characteristics of somatic hybridization and cybridization ==
1. Somatic cell fusion appears to be the only means through which two different parental genomes can be recombined among plants that cannot reproduce sexually (asexual or sterile).
2. Protoplasts of sexually sterile (haploid, triploid, and aneuploid) plants can be fused to produce fertile diploids and polyploids.
3. Somatic cell fusion overcomes sexual incompatibility barriers. In some cases somatic hybrids between two incompatible plants have also found application in industry or agriculture.
4. Somatic cell fusion is useful in the study of cytoplasmic genes and their activities and this information can be applied in plant breeding experiments.

=== Inter-specific and inter-generic fusion achievements ===
Note: The table only lists a few examples, there are many more crosses. The possibilities of this technology are great; however, not all species are easily put into protoplast culture.

Cross	Crossed with
Avena sativa (oats)	Zea mays (maize)
Brassica sinensis	Brassica oleracea
Torenia fournieri	Torenia flava
Brassica oleracea	Brassica campestris
Datura innoxia	Atropa belladonna
Nicotiana tabacum	Nicotiana glutinosa
Datura innoxia	Datura × candida
Arabidopsis thaliana	Brassica campestris
Petunia hybrida	Vicia faba
