= UCK1 =

Human protein-coding gene

Identifiers
- Aliases: UCK1, URK1, uridine-cytidine kinase 1
- External IDs: OMIM: 609328; MGI: 98904; GeneCards: UCK1
Available structures
PDB	Ortholog search: PDBe RCSB
PDB	List of PDB id codes 2JEO, 2UVQ
Enzyme activity
EC #	BRENDA	ExPASy	KEGG	MetaCyc
2.7.1.48	↗	↗	↗	↗

Gene location (Human)
Chr.	Chromosome 9 (human)
Band	9q34.13	Start	131,523,801 bp
Band	9q34.13	End	131,531,264 bp

Gene location (Mouse)
Chr.	Chromosome 2 (mouse)
Band	2|2 B	Start	32,145,014 bp
Band	2|2 B	End	32,150,171 bp
RNA expression pattern
Bgee	Human / Mouse (ortholog); Top expressed in: pancreatic ductal cell; cerebellar hemisphere; right hemisphere of cerebellum; tibialis anterior muscle; gastric mucosa; right lobe of liver; C1 segment; apex of heart; amygdala; gastrocnemius muscle / Top expressed in: white adipose tissue; proximal tubule; right kidney; adrenal gland; human kidney; ovary; olfactory bulb; hypothalamus; esophagus; mesencephalon; More reference expression data
BioGPS	n/a
Gene ontology
Molecular function	uridine kinase activity; kinase activity; nucleoside kinase activity; ATP binding; nucleotide binding; transferase activity; protein binding
Cellular component	cytosol
Biological process	pyrimidine nucleoside salvage; phosphorylation; UMP salvage; metabolism; CTP salvage; pyrimidine nucleobase metabolic process
Sources:Amigo / QuickGO
Orthologs
Databases	NCBI: entry; OMA: entry
Species	Human	Mouse
Entrez	83549	22245
Ensembl	ENSG00000130717	ENSMUSG00000002550
UniProt	Q9HA47	P52623
RefSeq (mRNA)	NM_001135954; NM_001261450; NM_001261451; NM_031432; NM_001318519	NM_011675; NM_001378791; NM_001378792
RefSeq (protein)	NP_001129426; NP_001248379; NP_001248380; NP_001305448; NP_113620	NP_035805; NP_001365720; NP_001365721
Location (UCSC)	Chr 9: 131.52 – 131.53 Mb	Chr 2: 32.15 – 32.15 Mb
PubMed search
- Wikidata
View/Edit Human	View/Edit Mouse

Uridine-cytidine kinase 1 (UCK1), also known as URK1, is an enzyme that in humans is encoded by the UCK1 gene. It participates in the pyrimidine nucleotide salvage by phosphorylating either uridine or cytidine to form uridine monophosphate (UMP) and cytidine monophosphate (CMP), respectively.

== Gene ==
The human UCK1 gene is located on chromosome 9 at 9q34.13. Alternative splicing produces multiple transcripts encoding distinct protein isoforms.

== Function ==
UCK1 recycles pyrimidine nucleosides into nucleotides, providing an alternative to their de novo synthesis. It is one of three human uridine-cytidine kinases, the others being UCKL1 and UCK2. UCK1 can use either ATP or GTP as a phosphate donor and can also phosphorylate some uridine and cytidine analogs.

== Clinical significance ==
Reduced UCK1 expression is associated with poorer response to azacitidine in patients with myelodysplastic syndromes.

== See also ==
- Uridine kinase
