= Purine nucleoside phosphorylase =

Class of enzymes

purine-nucleoside phosphorylase
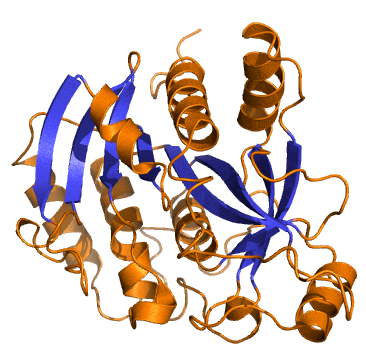
- purine-nucleoside phosphorylase. PDB 1rct.

Identifiers
- EC no.: 2.4.2.1
- CAS no.: 9030-21-1

Databases
- BRENDA: enzyme data
- ExPASy: NiceZyme view
- KEGG: enzyme entry
- MetaCyc: metabolic pathway
- Rhea: reactions
- PDB structures: RCSB PDB PDBe PDBsum
- Gene Ontology: AmiGO / QuickGO
Search
- PMC: articles
- PubMed: articles
- NCBI: proteins

PNP

Identifiers
- Aliases: PNP, NP, PRO1837, PUNP, purine nucleoside phosphorylase
- External IDs: OMIM: 164050; MGI: 97365; GeneCards: PNP
Available structures
PDB	Ortholog search: PDBe RCSB
PDB	List of PDB id codes 1M73, 1PF7, 1PWY, 1RCT, 1RFG, 1RR6, 1RSZ, 1RT9, 1ULA, 1ULB, 1V2H, 1V3Q, 1V41, 1V45, 1YRY, 2A0W, 2A0X, 2A0Y, 2OC4, 2OC9, 2ON6, 2Q7O, 3BGS, 3D1V, 3GB9, 3GGS, 3INY, 3K8O, 3K8Q, 3PHB, 4EAR, 4EB8, 4ECE, 4GKA
Enzyme activity
EC #	BRENDA	ExPASy	KEGG	MetaCyc
2.4.2.1	↗	↗	↗	↗

Gene location (Human)
Chr.	Chromosome 14 (human)
Band	14q11.2	Start	20,468,954 bp
Band	14q11.2	End	20,477,089 bp

Gene location (Mouse)
Chr.	Chromosome 14 (mouse)
Band	14 C1|14 26.31 cM	Start	51,168,539 bp
Band	14 C1|14 26.31 cM	End	51,202,694 bp
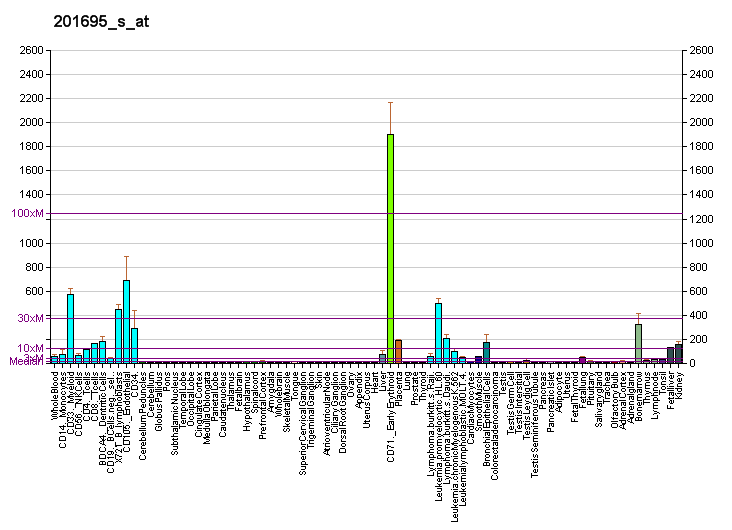
RNA expression pattern
Bgee	Human / Mouse (ortholog); Top expressed in: corpus epididymis; mucosa of transverse colon; monocyte; gallbladder; bone marrow; mucosa of esophagus; rectum; human kidney; trabecular bone; bone marrow cell / Top expressed in: stroma of bone marrow; endothelial cell of lymphatic vessel; epithelium of small intestine; Epithelium of choroid plexus; jejunum; ileum; intestinal villus; duodenum; carotid body; left lobe of liver; More reference expression data
BioGPS	More reference expression data
Gene ontology
Molecular function	transferase activity; phosphate ion binding; nucleoside binding; glycosyltransferase activity; purine-nucleoside phosphorylase activity; purine nucleobase binding; catalytic activity; pentosyltransferase activity
Cellular component	cytoplasm; cytosol; intracellular anatomical structure; extracellular exosome; cytoskeleton; nucleus; extracellular region; secretory granule lumen; ficolin-1-rich granule lumen
Biological process	purine nucleotide catabolic process; purine nucleoside metabolic process; nucleoside metabolic process; inosine catabolic process; positive regulation of T cell proliferation; immune response; nicotinamide riboside catabolic process; NAD biosynthesis via nicotinamide riboside salvage pathway; nucleobase-containing compound metabolic process; positive regulation of alpha-beta T cell differentiation; urate biosynthetic process; neutrophil degranulation; purine-containing compound salvage; nucleotide biosynthetic process
Sources:Amigo / QuickGO
Orthologs
Databases	NCBI: entry; OMA: entry
Species	Human	Mouse
Entrez	4860	18950
Ensembl	ENSG00000198805	ENSMUSG00000115338
UniProt	P00491	P23492
RefSeq (mRNA)	NM_000270	NM_013632
RefSeq (protein)	NP_000261	NP_038660
Location (UCSC)	Chr 14: 20.47 – 20.48 Mb	Chr 14: 51.17 – 51.2 Mb
PubMed search
- Wikidata
View/Edit Human	View/Edit Mouse

Purine nucleoside phosphorylase, PNP, PNPase or inosine phosphorylase (EC 2.4.2.1) is an enzyme that in humans is encoded by the PNP gene. It catalyzes the chemical reaction

Purine Nucleoside + Inorganic Phosphate (Pi) $\rightleftharpoons$ Purine Base + α-D-Ribose 1-Phosphate

The enzyme catalyzes reversible interconversion of purine nucleoside and phosphate into purine base and α-D-ribose 1-phosphate.

== Nomenclature ==
This enzyme belongs to the family of glycosyltransferases, specifically the pentosyltransferases. The systematic name of this enzyme class is purine-nucleoside:phosphate ribosyltransferase.

Other names in common use include:

- inosine phosphorylase
- PNPase
- PUNPI
- PUNPII
- inosine-guanosine phosphorylase
- nucleotide phosphatase
- purine deoxynucleoside phosphorylase
- purine deoxyribonucleoside phosphorylase
- purine nucleoside phosphorylase
- purine ribonucleoside phosphorylas

This enzyme participates in 3 metabolic pathways: purine metabolism, pyrimidine metabolism, and nicotinate and nicotinamide metabolism.

== Function ==
Purine nucleoside phosphorylase is an enzyme involved in purine metabolism. PNP metabolizes inosine into hypoxanthine and guanosine into guanine, in each case creating ribose-1-phosphate. In humans, adenosine is first metabolized to inosine via the enzyme adenosine deaminase.

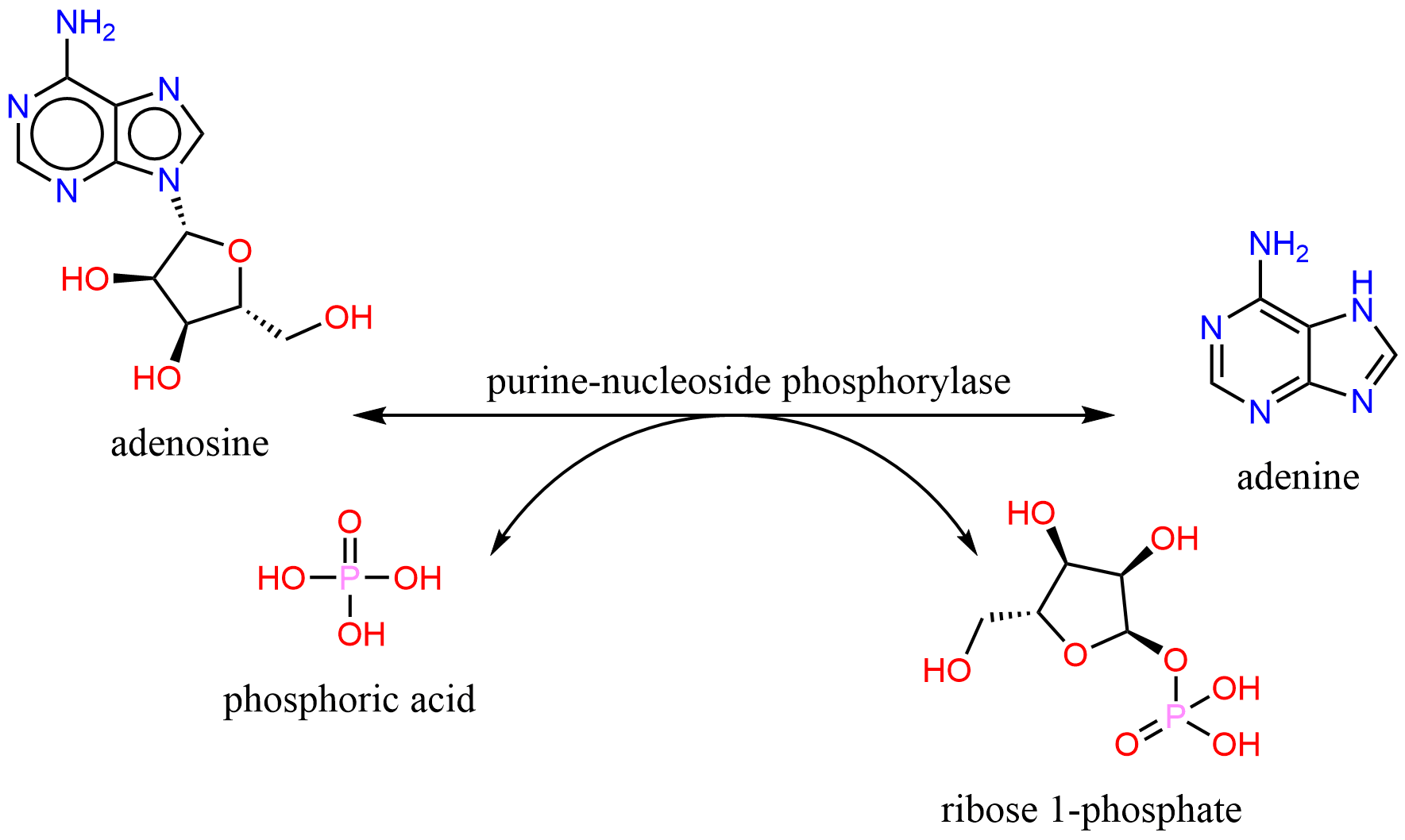
One of the reactions catalyzed by purine nucleoside phosphorylase in purine metabolism

Nucleoside phosphorylase is an enzyme which cleaves a nucleoside by phosphorylating the ribose to produce a nucleobase and ribose-1-phosphate. It is one enzyme of the nucleotide salvage pathways. These pathways allow the cell to produce nucleotide monophosphates when the de novo synthesis pathway has been interrupted or is non-existent (as is the case in the brain). Often the de novo pathway is interrupted as a result of chemotherapy drugs such as methotrexate or aminopterin.

All salvage pathway enzymes require a high energy phosphate donor such as ATP or PRPP. For pyrimidine nucleosides:

- Thymidine can be phosphorylated by thymidine kinase.
- Uridine can be phosphorylated by uridine kinase.
- Cytidine can be phosphorylated by cytidine kinase.
- Deoxycytidine can be phosphorylated by deoxycytidine kinase.

Adenosine uses the enzyme adenosine kinase, which is a very important enzyme in the cell. Attempts are being made to develop an inhibitor for the enzyme for use in cancer chemotherapy.

== Enzyme regulation ==
PNP protein may use the morpheein model of allosteric regulation.

== Clinical significance ==
Purine nucleoside phosphorylase, together with adenosine deaminase (ADA), serves a key role in purine catabolism. Mutations in ADA lead to an accumulation of dATP, which inhibits ribonucleotide reductase, leading to a deficiency in dCTP and dTTP, which, in turn, induces apoptosis in T-lymphocytes and B-lymphocytes, leading to severe combined immunodeficiency (SCID).

PNP-deficient patients will have an immunodeficiency problem. It affects only T-cells; B-cells are unaffected by the deficiency.

== See also ==
- Purine nucleoside phosphorylase deficiency
