= Deoxyuridine phosphorylase =

Class of enzymes

deoxyuridine phosphorylase

Identifiers
- EC no.: 2.4.2.23
- CAS no.: 37277-77-3

Databases
- IntEnz: IntEnz view
- BRENDA: BRENDA entry
- ExPASy: NiceZyme view
- KEGG: KEGG entry
- MetaCyc: metabolic pathway
- PRIAM: profile
- PDB structures: RCSB PDB PDBe PDBsum
Search
- PMC: articles
- PubMed: articles
- NCBI: proteins

In enzymology, a deoxyuridine phosphorylase is an enzyme that catalyzes the chemical reaction

2'-deoxyuridine + phosphate $\rightleftharpoons$ uracil + 2-deoxy-alpha-D-ribose 1-phosphate

Thus, the two substrates of this enzyme are 2'-deoxyuridine and phosphate, whereas its two products are uracil and 2-deoxy-alpha-D-ribose 1-phosphate.

No enzyme is known to be specific for this reaction, hence the EC number originally assigned to this enzyme function (EC 2.4.2.23) was deleted by the IUBMB in 2013. The reaction is catalysed by EC 2.4.2.2, pyrimidine-nucleoside phosphorylase, EC 2.4.2.3, uridine phosphorylase, and EC 2.4.2.4, thymidine phosphorylase.

These enzymes belong to the family of glycosyltransferases, specifically the pentosyltransferases. They participate in pyrimidine metabolism.
