= Hybridoma technology =

Method for producing lots of identical antibodies

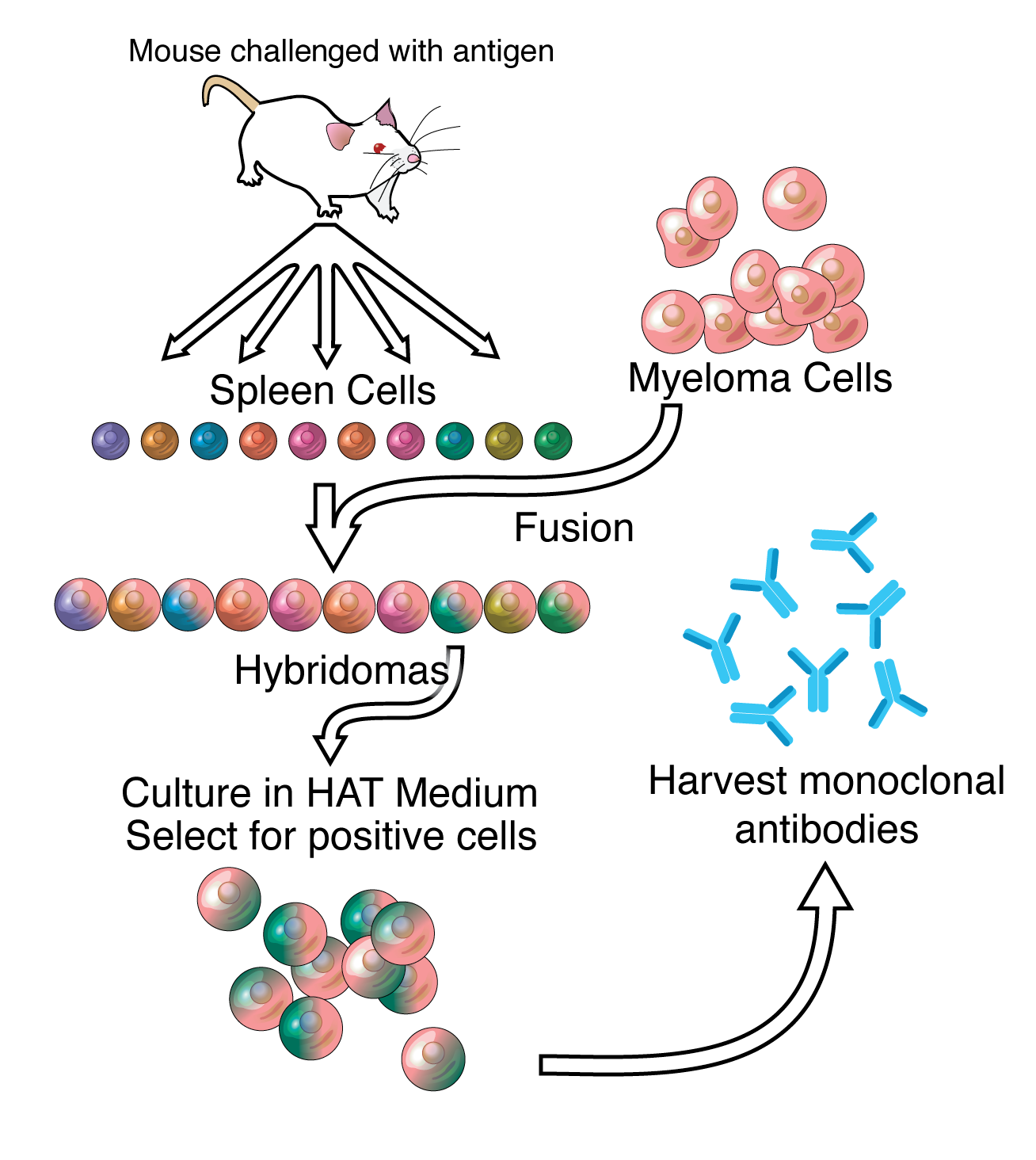
A general representation of the hybridoma method used to produce monoclonal antibodies.

Hybridoma technology is a method for producing large quantities of monoclonal antibodies by fusing antibody producing B cells with myeloma cells (cancerous B cells). This creates hybrid cells, hybridomas, that produce the antibody from their parent B cell whilst maintaining the properties of the parental myeloma cell line being immortal (endlessly reproducing) and having desirable properties for cell culture. The B cells to be used are generally gathered from animals who have been immunized with an antigen against which an antibody targeting it is desired.

After forming hybridomas any non-hybrid cells are killed before screening and monoclonalization to create hybridoma lines that are derived from one parental cell and thus producing the same antibody against the desired target.

The production of monoclonal antibodies was invented by César Milstein and Georges J. F. Köhler in 1975. They shared the Nobel Prize of 1984 for Medicine and Physiology with Niels Kaj Jerne, who made other contributions to immunology. The term hybridoma was coined by Leonard Herzenberg during his sabbatical in Milstein's laboratory in 1976–1977.

== Method ==
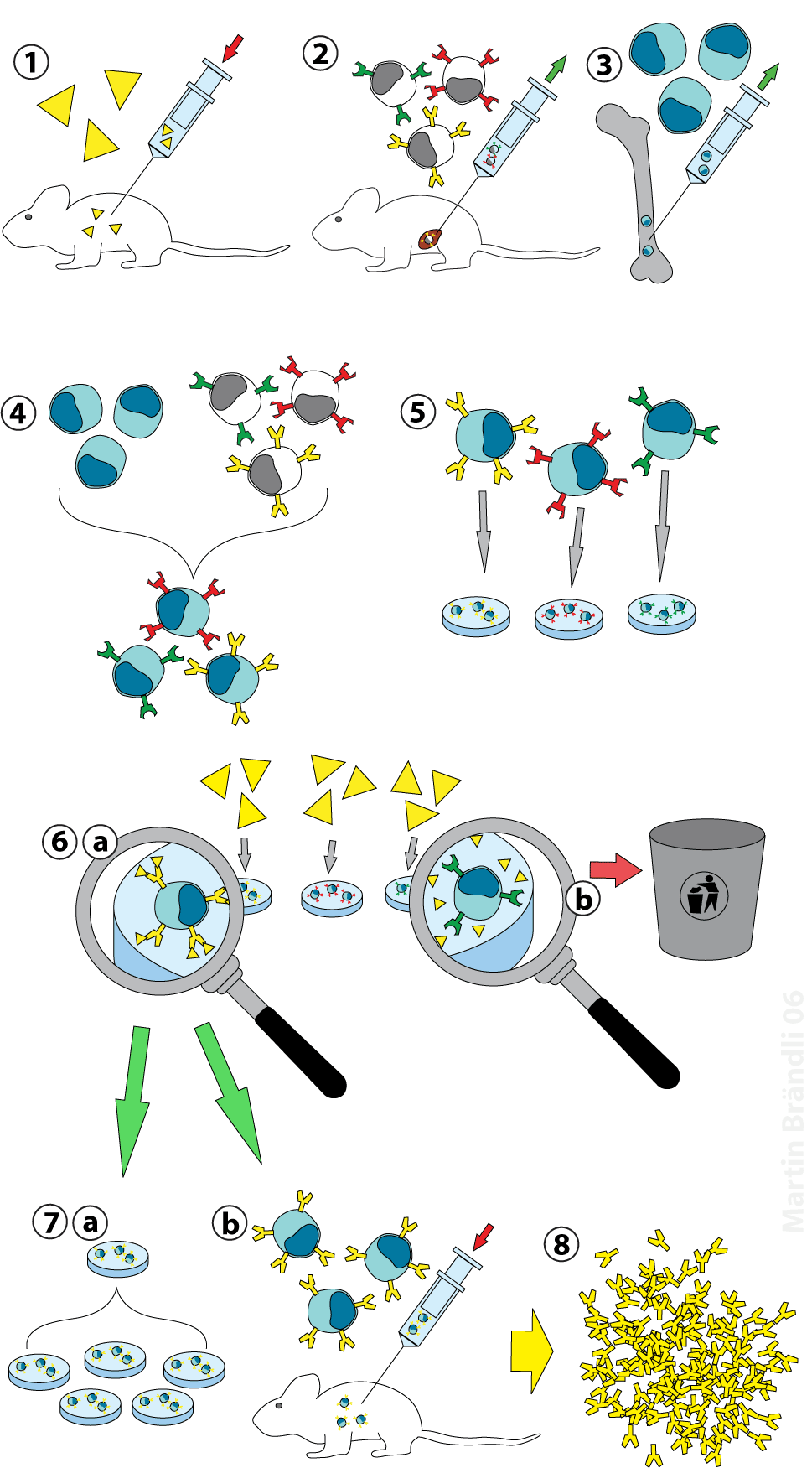
(1) Immunisation of a mouse (2) Isolation of B cells from the spleen (3) Cultivation of myeloma cells (4) Fusion of myeloma and B cells (5) Separation of cell lines (6) Screening of suitable cell lines (7) in vitro (a) or in vivo (b) multiplication (8) Excised spleen processed for antibody extraction

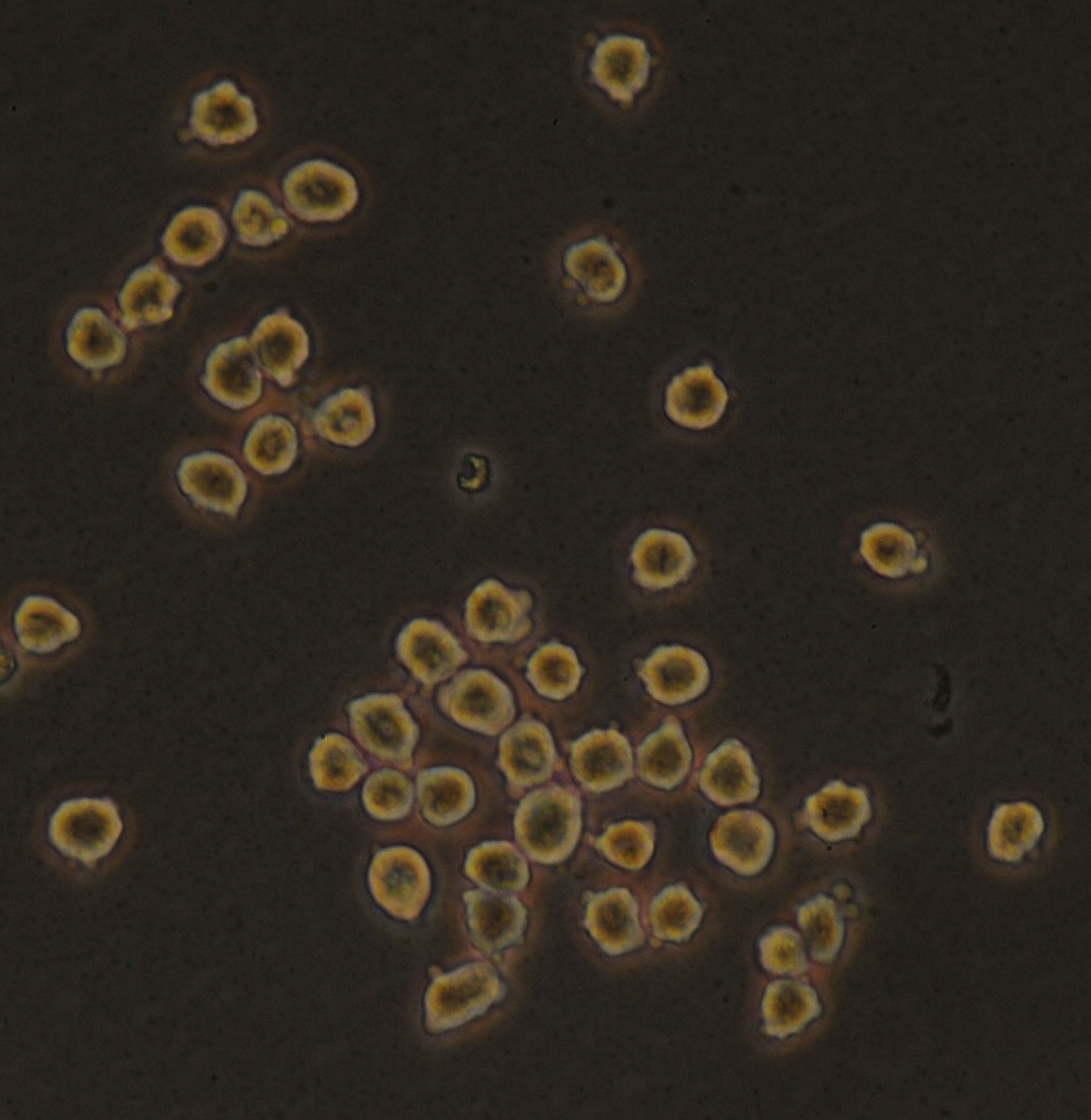
Hybridoma cells grown in tissue culture. The image shows a single clone of cells each of which is producing large amounts of a specific monoclonal antibody which the cells secrete and which can be readily purified from the culture media.

Laboratory animals (mammals, e.g. mice) are first exposed to the antigen against which an antibody is to be generated. Usually this is done by a series of injections of the antigen in question, over the course of several weeks. These injections are typically followed by the use of in vivo electroporation, which significantly enhances the immune response. Once splenocytes are isolated from the mammal's spleen, the B cells are fused with immortalised myeloma cells. The fusion of the B cells with myeloma cells can be done using electrofusion. Electrofusion causes the B cells and myeloma cells to align and fuse with the application of an electric field. Alternatively, the B-cells and myelomas can be made to fuse by chemical protocols, most often using polyethylene glycol. The myeloma cells are selected beforehand to ensure they are not secreting antibody themselves and that they lack the hypoxanthine-guanine phosphoribosyltransferase (HGPRT) gene, making them sensitive (or vulnerable) to the HAT medium (see below).

Fused cells are incubated in HAT medium (hypoxanthine-aminopterin-thymidine medium) for roughly 10 to 14 days. Aminopterin blocks the pathway that allows for nucleotide synthesis. Hence, unfused myeloma cells die, as they cannot produce nucleotides by the de novo or salvage pathways because they lack HGPRT. Removal of the unfused myeloma cells is necessary because they have the potential to outgrow other cells, especially weakly established hybridomas. Unfused B cells die as they have a short life span. In this way, only the B cell-myeloma hybrids survive, since the HGPRT gene coming from the B cells is functional. These cells produce antibodies (a property of B cells) and are immortal (a property of myeloma cells). The incubated medium is then diluted into multi-well plates to such an extent that each well contains only one cell. Since the antibodies in a well are produced by the same B cell, they will be directed towards the same epitope, and are thus monoclonal antibodies.

The next stage is a rapid primary screening process, which identifies and selects only those hybridomas that produce antibodies of appropriate specificity. The first screening technique used is called ELISA. The hybridoma culture supernatant, secondary enzyme labeled conjugate, and chromogenic substrate, are then incubated, and the formation of a colored product indicates a positive hybridoma. Alternatively, immunocytochemical, western blot, and immunoprecipitation-mass spectrometry. Unlike western blot assays, immunoprecipitation-mass spectrometry facilitates screening and ranking of clones which bind to the native (non-denaturated) forms of antigen proteins. Flow cytometry screening has been used for primary screening of a large number (~1000) of hybridoma clones recognizing the native form of the antigen on the cell surface. In the flow cytometry-based screening, a mixture of antigen-negative cells and antigen-positive cells is used as the antigen to be tested for each hybridoma supernatant sample.

The B cell that produces the desired antibodies can be cloned to produce many identical daughter clones. Supplemental media containing interleukin-6 (such as briclone) are essential for this step. Once a hybridoma colony is established, it will continually grow in culture medium like RPMI-1640 (with antibiotics and fetal bovine serum) and produce antibodies.

Multiwell plates are used initially to grow the hybridomas, and after selection, are changed to larger tissue culture flasks. This maintains the well-being of the hybridomas and provides enough cells for cryopreservation and supernatant for subsequent investigations. The culture supernatant can yield 1 to 60 μg/ml of monoclonal antibody, which is maintained at -20 °C or lower until required.

By using culture supernatant or a purified immunoglobulin preparation, further analysis of a potential monoclonal antibody producing hybridoma can be made in terms of reactivity, specificity, and cross-reactivity.

== Applications ==
The use of monoclonal antibodies is numerous and includes the prevention, diagnosis, and treatment of disease. For example, monoclonal antibodies can distinguish subsets of B cells and T cells, which is helpful in identifying different types of leukaemias. In addition, specific monoclonal antibodies have been used to define cell surface markers on white blood cells and other cell types. This led to the cluster of differentiation series of markers. These are often referred to as CD markers and define several hundred different cell surface components of cells, each specified by binding of a particular monoclonal antibody. Such antibodies are extremely useful for fluorescence-activated cell sorting, the specific isolation of particular types of cells.

=== In diagnostic histopathology ===
With the help of monoclonal antibodies, tissues and organs can be classified based on their expression of certain defined markers, which reflect tissue or cellular genesis. Prostate specific antigen, placental alkaline phosphatase, human chorionic gonadotrophin, α-fetoprotein and others are organ-associated antigens and the production of monoclonal antibodies against these antigens helps in determining the nature of a primary tumor.

Monoclonal antibodies are especially useful in distinguishing morphologically similar lesions, like pleural and peritoneal mesothelioma, adenocarcinoma, and in the determination of the organ or tissue origin of undifferentiated metastases. Selected monoclonal antibodies help in the detection of occult metastases (cancer of unknown primary origin) by immuno-cytological analysis of bone marrow, other tissue aspirates, as well as lymph nodes and other tissues and can have increased sensitivity over normal histopathological staining.

One study performed a sensitive immuno-histochemical assay on bone marrow aspirates of 20 patients with localized prostate cancer. Three monoclonal antibodies (T16, C26, and AE-1), capable of recognizing membrane and cytoskeletal antigens expressed by epithelial cells to detect tumour cells, were used in the assay. Bone marrow aspirates of 22% of patients with localized prostate cancer (stage B, 0/5; Stage C, 2/4), and 36% patients with metastatic prostate cancer (Stage D1, 0/7 patients; Stage D2, 4/4 patients) had antigen-positive cells in their bone marrow. It was concluded that immuno-histochemical staining of bone marrow aspirates are very useful to detect occult bone marrow metastases in patients with apparently localized prostate cancer.

Although immuno-cytochemistry using tumor-associated monoclonal antibodies has led to an improved ability to detect occult breast cancer cells in bone marrow aspirates and peripheral blood, further development of this method is necessary before it can be used routinely. One major drawback of immuno-cytochemistry is that only tumor-associated and not tumor-specific monoclonal antibodies are used, and as a result, some cross-reaction with normal cells can occur.

In order to effectively stage breast cancer and assess the efficacy of purging regimens prior to autologous stem cell infusion, it is important to detect even small quantities of breast cancer cells. Immuno-histochemical methods are ideal for this purpose because they are simple, sensitive, and quite specific. Franklin et al. performed a sensitive immuno-cytochemical assay by using a combination of four monoclonal antibodies (260F9, 520C9, 317G5 and BrE-3) against tumor cell surface glycoproteins to identify breast tumour cells in bone marrow and peripheral blood. They concluded from the results that immuno-cytochemical staining of bone marrow and peripheral blood is a sensitive and simple way to detect and quantify breast cancer cells.

One of the main reasons for metastatic relapse in patients with solid tumours is the early dissemination of malignant cells. The use of monoclonal antibodies (mAbs) specific for cytokeratins can identify disseminated individual epithelial tumor cells in the bone marrow.

One study reports on having developed an immuno-cytochemical procedure for simultaneous labeling of cytokeratin component no. 18 (CK18) and prostate specific antigen (PSA). This would help in the further characterization of disseminated individual epithelial tumor cells in patients with prostate cancer. The twelve control aspirates from patients with benign prostatic hyperplasia showed negative staining, which further supports the specificity of CK18 in detecting epithelial tumour cells in bone marrow.

In most cases of malignant disease complicated by effusion, neoplastic cells can be easily recognized. However, in some cases, malignant cells are not so easily seen or their presence is too doubtful to call it a positive report. The use of immuno-cytochemical techniques increases diagnostic accuracy in these cases.

Ghosh, Mason and Spriggs analysed 53 samples of pleural or peritoneal fluid from 41 patients with malignant disease. Conventional cytological examination had not revealed any neoplastic cells. Three monoclonal antibodies (anti-CEA, Ca 1 and HMFG-2) were used to search for malignant cells. Immunocytochemical labelling was performed on unstained smears, which had been stored at -20 °C up to 18 months. Twelve of the forty-one cases in which immuno-cytochemical staining was performed, revealed malignant cells. The result represented an increase in diagnostic accuracy of approximately 20%. The study concluded that in patients with suspected malignant disease, immuno-cytochemical labeling should be used routinely in the examination of cytologically negative samples and has important implications with respect to patient management.

Another application of immuno-cytochemical staining is for the detection of two antigens in the same smear. Double staining with light chain antibodies and with T and B cell markers can indicate the neoplastic origin of a lymphoma.

One study has reported the isolation of a hybridoma cell line (clone 1E10), which produces a monoclonal antibody (IgM, k isotype). This monoclonal antibody shows specific immuno-cytochemical staining of nucleoli.

Tissues and tumours can be classified based on their expression of certain markers, with the help of monoclonal antibodies. They help in distinguishing morphologically similar lesions and in determining the organ or tissue origin of undifferentiated metastases. Immuno-cytological analysis of bone marrow, tissue aspirates, lymph nodes etc. with selected monoclonal antibodies help in the detection of occult metastases. Monoclonal antibodies increase the sensitivity in detecting even small quantities of invasive or metastatic cells. Monoclonal antibodies (mAbs) specific for cytokeratins can detect disseminated individual epithelial tumour cells in the bone marrow.
