= Uracil-5-carboxylate decarboxylase =

Class of enzymes

Identifiers
- EC no.: 4.1.1.66
- CAS no.: 59299-01-3

Databases
- BRENDA: enzyme data
- ExPASy: NiceZyme view
- KEGG: enzyme entry
- MetaCyc: metabolic pathway
- Rhea: reactions
- PDB structures: RCSB PDB PDBe PDBsum
- Gene Ontology: AmiGO / QuickGO
Search
- PMC: articles
- PubMed: articles
- NCBI: proteins

Uracil-5-carboxylate decarboxylase (EC 4.1.1.66) is an enzyme characterised from Neurospora crassa that catalyzes the decarboxylation of uracil-5-carboxylic acid to uracil:

uracil-5-carboxylic acid
CO_{2}
uracil

The reaction is part of the salvage pathway for thymidine.

This enzyme is a lyase, specifically a carboxy-lyase, which cleave carbon-carbon bonds. The systematic name of this enzyme class is uracil-5-carboxylate carboxy-lyase (uracil-forming). Other names in use include uracil-5-carboxylic acid decarboxylase, and uracil-5-carboxylate carboxy-lyase.
