= Streptomyces morookaensis =

Scientific classification
- Domain: Bacteria
- Kingdom: Bacillati
- Phylum: Actinomycetota
- Class: Actinomycetes
- Order: Streptomycetales
- Family: Streptomycetaceae
- Genus: Streptomyces
- Species: S. morookaensis

Binomial name
- Streptomyces morookaensis corrig. (Locci and Schofield 1989) Witt and Stackebrandt 1991

Type strain
- ATCC 19166, BCRC 15169, CBS 717.72, CCRC 15169, CGMCC 4.1986, CIP 108145, DSM 40503, IFO 13416, ISP 5503, ISP 55036, JCM 4673, JCM 4793, Kaisha SF-337, KCC S-0673, KCC S-0793, KCTC 19944, LMG 20074, NBRC 13416, NRRL B-12429, NRRL-ISP 55036, RIA 1377, SF-337, VKM Ac-1916

Synonyms
- Streptomyces morookaense (Locci and Schofield 1989) Witt and Stackebrandt 1991; Streptoverticillium morookaense (ex Niida et al. 1963) Locci and Schofield 1989

Species of bacterium

Streptomyces morookaensis is a bacterium species from the genus of Streptomyces which has been isolated from soil. Streptomyces morookaense produces 8-azaguanine and blasticidin S.

== See also ==
- List of Streptomyces species
