= UPH =

UPH may refer to:

- Unpenthexium, an unsynthesized chemical element with atomic number 156 and symbol Uph
- Uridine phosphorylase, an enzyme
- University of Perpetual Help System DALTA, a private university system
- Pelita Harapan University (Universitas Pelita Harapan), a private Christian university in Indonesia
- Upper Halliford railway station, Surrey, National Rail station code UPH
