= Uridine kinase =

Class of enzymes

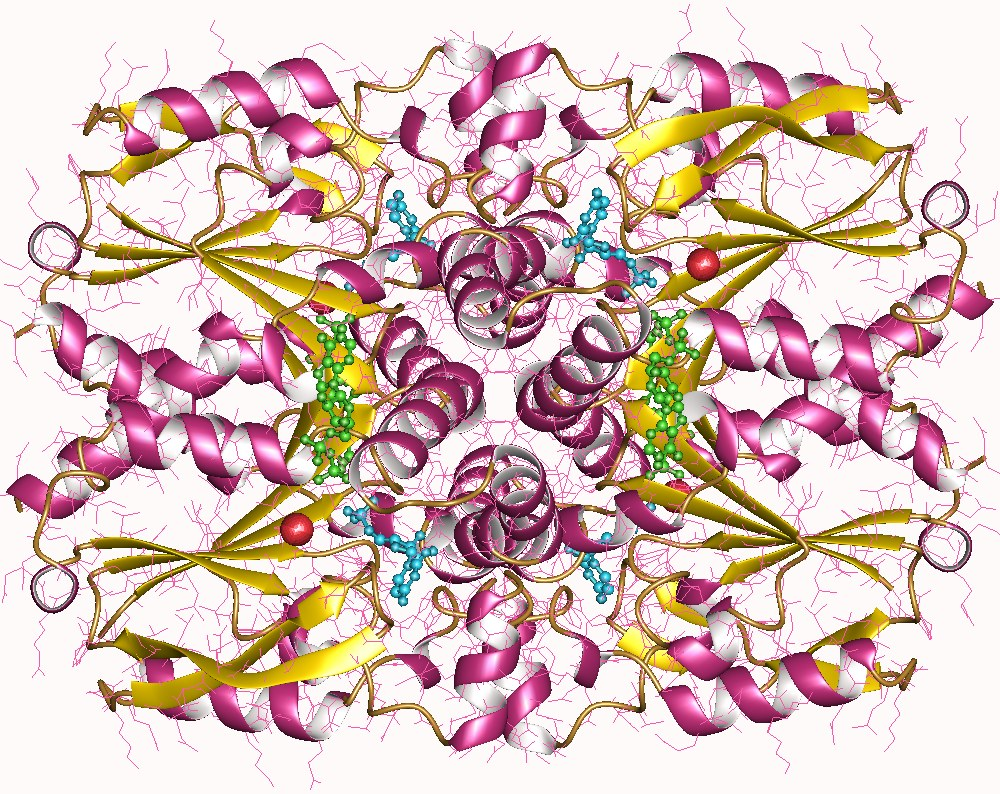
- Uridine-cytidine kinase 2, tetramer, Human

Identifiers
- EC no.: 2.7.1.48
- CAS no.: 9026-39-5

Databases
- BRENDA: enzyme data
- ExPASy: NiceZyme view
- KEGG: enzyme entry
- MetaCyc: metabolic pathway
- Rhea: reactions
- PDB structures: RCSB PDB PDBe PDBsum
- Gene Ontology: AmiGO / QuickGO
Search
- PMC: articles
- PubMed: articles
- NCBI: proteins

Uridine kinase (EC 2.7.1.48) is an enzyme that catalyzes the chemical reaction

ATP +
uridine
ADP +
uridine monophosphate

The enzyme characterised from an ascites tumor and Escherichia coli converts uridine to uridine monophosphate and cytidine to cytidine monophosphate by transferring a phosphate group from the cofactor, adenosine triphosphate (ATP), which is converted to adenosine diphosphate (ADP). The enzyme occurs widely, including in yeasts, humans and plants.

Human genes encoding uridine kinases include UCK1, UCKL1, and UCK2.

== Nomenclature ==
This enzyme is a transferase, specifically one transferring phosphorus-containing groups (phosphotransferases) with an alcohol group as acceptor. The systematic name of this enzyme class is ATP:uridine 5'-phosphotransferase. Other names in common use include:

- pyrimidine ribonucleoside kinase
- uridine-cytidine kinase
- uridine kinase (phosphorylating)
- uridine phosphokinase
