= Pyrimidine phosphorylase =

Pyrimidine phosphorylase may refer to:

- Thymidine phosphorylase
- Uridine phosphorylase
