= Thymus transplantation =

Form of organ transplantation

- ICD-9-CM: 07.94

Thymus transplantation is a form of organ transplantation where the thymus is moved from one body to another. It is used in certain immunodeficiencies, such as DiGeorge Syndrome.

== Indications ==
Thymus transplantation is used to treat infants with DiGeorge syndrome, which results in an absent or hypoplastic thymus, in turn causing problems with the immune system's T-cell mediated response. It is used in people with complete DiGeorge anomaly, which are entirely athymic. This subgroup represents less than 1% of DiGeorge syndrome patients.

Nezelof syndrome is another thymus-related disease where it can be used.

Thymus transplantation can also be used in pediatric patients with a Foxn1 deficiency.

=== Co-transplantation with other organs ===
In the 2000s, promising animal experiments into transplanting thymic tissue and another organ at the same time were carried out, in order to improve the recipient's tolerance of the transplanted organ, and to reduce the need for immunosuppressing drugs like tacrolimus. Such trials have been performed with kidney and heart transplants, drastically extending the time the animals were surviving without immunosuppressing drugs. The first human heart-and-thymus co-transplantation was performed on Easton Sinnamon in 2022, a newborn who suffered from both a lack of T cells, and a serious heart defect. Depending on the development, it is planned to wean him off immunosuppressant drugs, but it remains to be seen whether the same technique is viable in adults, as the thymus shrinks with age, with the bone marrow taking over T cell production.

== Effects and prognosis ==
A study of 54 DiGeorge syndrome infants resulted in all tested subjects having developed polyclonal T-cell repertoires and proliferative responses to mitogens. The procedure was well tolerated and resulted in stable immunoreconstitution in these infants. It had a survival rate of 75%, having a follow-up as long as 13 years.

Complications include an increased susceptibility to infections while the T cells have not yet developed, rashes and erythema.

=== Graft-versus-host disease ===
Theoretically, thymus transplantation could cause two types of graft-versus-host disease (GVHD): First, it could cause a donor T cell-related GVHD, because of T cells from the donor that are present in the transplanted thymus that recognizes the recipient as foreign. Donor T cells can be detected in the recipient after transplantation, but there is no evidence of any donor T cell-related graft-versus-host disease.

Second, a thymus transplantation can cause a non-donor T cell-related GVHD because the recipients thymocytes would use the donor thymus cells as models when going through the negative selection to recognize self-antigens, and could therefore still mistake own structures in the rest of the body for being non-self. This is a rather indirect GVHD because it is not directly cells in the graft itself that causes it, but cells in the graft that make the recipient's T cells act like donor T cells. It would also be of relatively late-onset because it requires the formation of new T cells. It can be seen as a multiple-organ autoimmunity in xenotransplantation experiments of the thymus between different species. Autoimmune disease is a frequent complication after human allogeneic thymus transplantation, found in 42% of subjects over 1 year post transplantation. However, this is partially explained by that the indication itself, that is, complete DiGeorge syndrome, increases the risk of autoimmune disease.
