= Purine nucleoside phosphorylase deficiency =

- Other names: PNP-deficiency
- Purine nucleoside phosphorylase deficiency has an autosomal recessive pattern of inheritance.
- Treatment: Allegeneic hemotopoietic stem cell transplantation (HSCT)

Purine nucleoside phosphorylase deficiency is a rare autosomal recessive metabolic disorder which results in immunodeficiency.

== Signs and symptoms ==
In addition to the symptoms associated with immunodeficiency, such as depletion of T-cells, decline of lymphocyte activity, and an abrupt proliferation of both benign and opportunistic infections—PNP-deficiency is often characterized by the development of autoimmune disorders. lupus erythematosus, autoimmune hemolytic anemia, and idiopathic thrombocytopenic purpura have been reported with PNP-deficiency. Neurological symptoms, such as developmental decline, hypotonia, and mental retardation have also been reported.

== Cause ==
The disorder is caused by a mutation of the purine nucleoside phosphorylase (PNP) gene, located at chromosome 14q13.1. This mutation was first identified by Eloise Giblett, a professor at the University of Washington, in 1975. PNP is a key enzyme in the purine catabolic pathway, and is required for purine degradation. Specifically, it catalyzes the conversion of inosine to hypoxanthine and guanosine to guanine (both guanine and hypoxanthine will be made into xanthine which will then become uric acid). A deficiency of it leads to a buildup of elevated deoxy-GTP (dGTP) levels resulting in T-cell toxicity and deficiency. In contrast to adenosine deaminase deficiency (another deficiency of purine metabolism), there is minimal disruption to B cells.

PNP deficiency is inherited in an autosomal recessive manner. This means the defective gene responsible for the disorder is located on an autosome (chromosome 14 is an autosome), and two copies of the defective gene (one inherited from each parent) are required in order to be born with the disorder. The parents of an individual with an autosomal recessive disorder both carry one copy of the defective gene, but usually do not experience any signs or symptoms of the disorder.

== Diagnosis ==
Diagnosis is based on the clinical examination and on laboratory findings showing leukopenia, severe lymphopenia with low CD3, CD4, and CD8 counts and variable B cell function and immunoglobulin levels. Neutropenia has also been reported. Hallmark diagnostic markers of PNP deficiency include hypouricemia, complete or near complete absence of PNP activity in red blood cell lysate and increased urine or blood levels of inosine, guanosine and their deoxy forms. Diagnosis is confirmed by genetic screening of PNP.

=== Differential diagnosis ===
Differential diagnosis includes aplastic anemias, SCID, severe combined immunodeficiency due to adenosine deaminase deficiency, ataxia-telangiectasia, and viral meningoencephalitis.

== Screening ==
Measurement of T cell receptor excision circles during newborn screening for SCID can detect some patients with PNP deficiency, although removal of metabolites by maternal PNP may delay the deleterious effects on PNP-deficient lymphocytes. Few newborn screening programs also measure purine metabolites in dried

== Treatment ==
Supportive treatment, including intravenous immunoglobulin therapy, prophylaxis for Pneumocystis carinii, and physical, occupational, and speech therapy, reduces the risk of infection and may encourage optimal neurologic development for patients.

== Epidemiology ==
PNP deficiency is extremely rare. Only 33 patients with the disorder in the United States have been documented. In the United Kingdom only two children have been diagnosed with this disorder in 1994 and 2008.

== See also ==
- Nezelof syndrome
