= Xanthosine phosphorylase =

Catalytic enzyme

Properties
Name	Xanthosine Phosphorylase
Gene Names	xapA pndA b2407 JW2398
Synonyms	pndA, PNPII
Location	cytoplasm
Subunit Composition	[XapA]_{6}
Molecular Weight	29.835 kD
Map Position	[2,522,067 <- 2,522,900]

Resource	Identifier
Uniprot ID	P45563
Uniprot Name	XAPA ECOLI
GenBank Gene ID	AP009048
GenBank Protein ID	1651571
PDB ID	1YR3, 1YQU ,1YQQ
Ecogene ID	EG20250
Ecocyc	EG20250
ColiBase	b2407
Kegg Gene	b2407
EchoBASE ID	EB4152
CCDB	XAPA ECOLI
BacMap	16130333

Xanthosine phosphorylase, also known as inosine-guanosine phosphorylase, is a catalytic enzyme encoded by the XapA gene in E. coli. The presence of xanthosine is known to induce the synthesis of xanthosine phosphorylase by the XapA gene. The enzyme's main functions are nucleoside phosphorolysis and the synthesis of nucleotides, making it a member of the purine nucleoside phosphorylase group. This protein can degrade all purine nucleosides (including xanthosine) except adenosine, deoxyadenosine, hypoxanthine arabinoside. These degradation reactions are reversible in vitro, however, phosphorolysis dominates in vivo. Xanthosine phosphorylase is localized in the cytoplasm because these degradation functions take place there. Xanthosine phosphorylase preferentially uses the neutral form of xanthosine over its monoanionic form because it prefers to be in a neutral environment.

== Structure ==
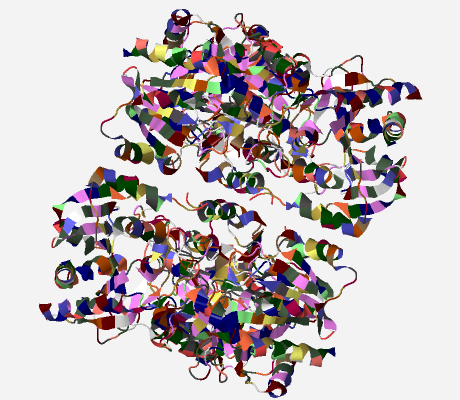
figure 1

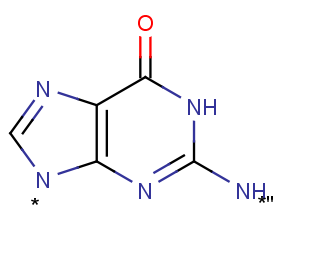
figure 2

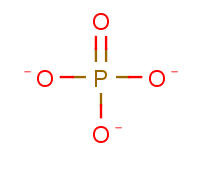
Phosphate ion figure 3

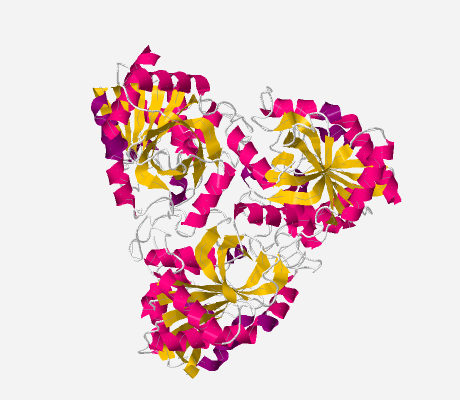
figure 4

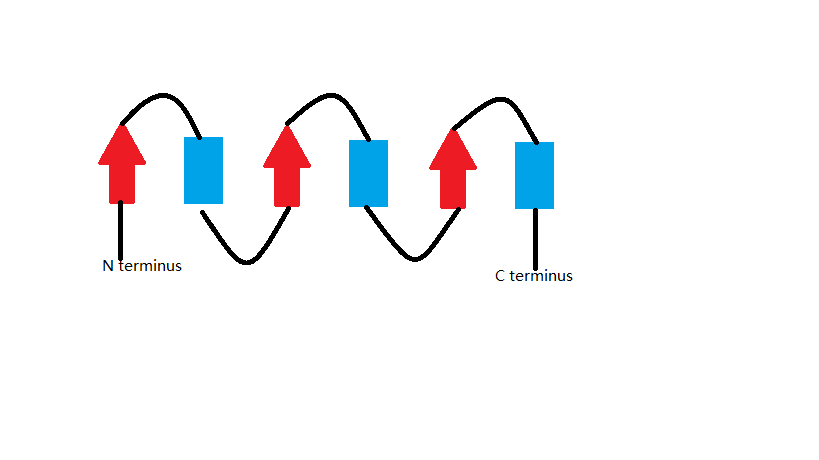
figure 5

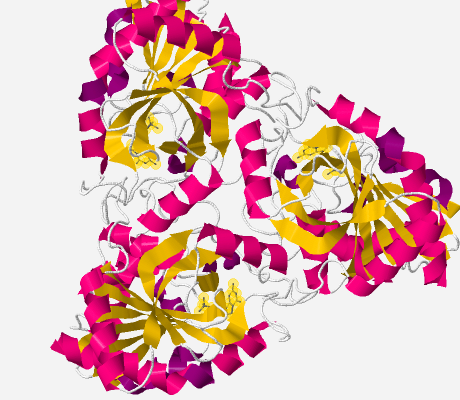
figure 6

There are three crystal structures. The three structures have been submitted under RSCB protein bank under the codes 1YQU (trigonal form with guanine and phosphate), 1YQQ (small orthorhombic form with guanine and phosphate) and 1YR3 (large orthorhombic form with xanthine and sulfate). (In this section all picture and drawing are created base on 1YQQ, excepte specially noted) Like other Purine nucleoside phosphorylases, xanthosine phosphorylase is a trimer but sometime migrates to a hexamer. The hexamer structure is a combine of two trimers rather than a combine of three dimers, therefore the hexamer is known as "dimer of trimers". Figure 1 shows the "dimer of trimers". The two trimer parts are upper right part and lower left part.

The ligand chemical components of Xanthosine phosphorylase (1YQQ) are a guanine and a phosphate ion.(figure 2 and figure 3) The ligands are buried in the loop. (figure 6) As the Jmol picture shows, the highlighted ligands are buried in the loop of the xanthosine phosphorylase. There are three loop 3D structure in the enzyme, each loop buries a phosphate ion and a guanine.

In the enzyme's crystal structure (figure 4) there is the presence of superimposible hexamers in the crystal forms imply that the hexamer is the predominant form under crystallization conditions. The structure is best described as a dimer of trimers. The 3D structure is shown below. From the 3D structure, the protein domain is a mixed of alpha helix and beta sheet. The alpha helix and beta sheet creates a loop.

The topology diagram (figure 5) shows the connectivity of the secondary structure which is alternative of alpha helices and beta sheets.

== History and discovery ==
In 1980, Hammer-Jepersen K, Buxton RS, and Hansen TD discovered the presence of a second purine nucleoside phosphorylase in wild strains of E. coli K-12 after it demonstrated growth on xanthosine. They came to the conclusion that xanthosine was the only compound that could induce xanthosine phosphorylase. They did not discover any other enzyme through this process, xanthosine phosphorylase was the only new resulting product.

== Synthesis ==
=== E.coli ===
Xanthosine phosphorylase(PNP-ĮĮ) is a kind of purine nucleoside phosphorylases (PNPs) in E. coli and it is located in the cytosol. The enzyme is encoded by a 873bp nucleotide gene sequence in E. coli, which encodes XapA, XapB and XapR According to Seeger's research, the XapA gene can't be expressed without the cooperation of XapR gene. XapA gene and XapR gene are almost transferred at the same time. Therefore, the XapA gene and XapB gene is located very closely. However, over expression of XapR doesn't increase of the XapA gene. The XapA gene's expression only increases maxim eight folds. Therefore other factors are also correspond to the expression of XapA. The absence of xanthosine shut off the promoter of XapA, indicating XapA cannot be synthesized in culture that lack xanthosine.

=== Human ===
The gene locus of Xanthosine phosphorylase for humans (Homo sapiens) is on chromosome 14q13.1. When disorders in the coding region occur, they will cause PNP deficiency.

== Reaction ==
=== Starting material ===
This enzyme catalyzes the phosphorylation and the enzyme's crystal structure. The "dimer of trimers structure" is helpful for creating the correct orientation of starting materials and converting them into intermediates. Xanthosine phosphorylase will bind to the transition state well, and the active site via the Protein Data Bank page, which can point toward critical residues that the enzyme uses. Sulfate ions in the active site allow for properly imposing stress on this substrate making it more likely to undergo the catalysis and to allow for this mechanism to proceed.

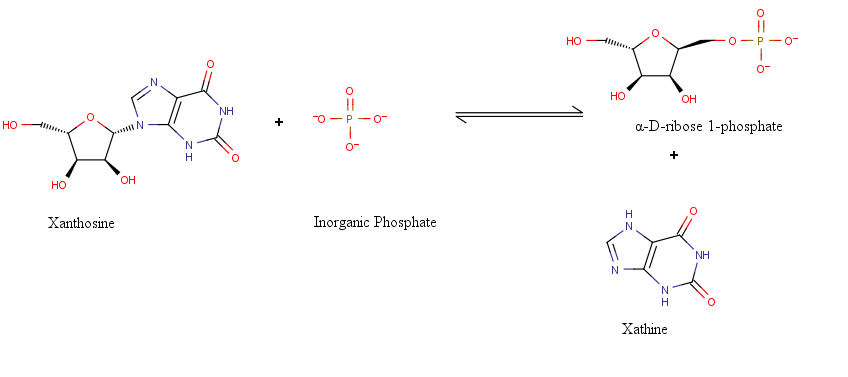
figure 8

=== catalysis ===
Experimental data has shown that xanthosine phosphorylase performs purine degradation via a substitution of xanthine for an inorganic phosphate group. This enzyme catalyzes the phosphorylation of xanthosine, inosine and guanosine.(figure 8) Xanthosine phosphorylase is a member of the purine nucleoside phosphorylase group, and its main functions are nucleoside phosphorolysis and synthesis of nucleosides. These actions take place in the cytoplasm so xanthosine phosphorylase is located in the cytoplasm. Xanthosine phosphorylase uses orthophosphate to cleave the N-glycosidic bond of ribonucleosides to yield the formation of the corresponding free purine base and ribose 1-phosphate.

Bifunctional catalysis is the prime pathway that this enzyme (and all other enzymes) has used. Acidic and basic residues that are posted toward the outside of the enzyme. This creates an environment that can correctly impose the phosphorylation mechanism. For example, we can take a look at this PDB structure that shows us all relevant interactions maintained in the enzyme's active site.

Xanthosine phosphorylase has the ability to degrade all purine nucleosides (including xanthosine), but cannot cleave adenosine, deoxyadenosine, or hypoxanthine arabinoside. Although this reaction is reversible in vitro, phosphorolysis is dominant in vivo. Additionally, xanthosine phosphorylase prefers to be in a neutral environment so it preferentially uses the neutral form of xanthosine instead of its monoanionic form. Monoanionic forms would create extreme problems in biological settings and catalysis would not be favorable.

=== pH ===
The resonance that Xanthosine is able to undergo. At lower pKa's, xanthosine is in the cationic form and although it is well resonated and fairly stable, it will not be found in this way in the body. In the neutral form, the two ring structures are connected. Xanthosine has two carbonyl oxygens, which means that this can allow for the attack of a nucleophile or stabilizing interactions between the oxygen and a hydrogen. Also, the two nitrogen atoms in the ring could potentially act as nucleophiles, but can also be used for stabilizing interactions that will allow for the proper phosphorylation. (Figure 7)

As a cytoplasmic enzyme, functioning under physiological pH, this enzyme is able to perform purine degradation which can be a result of substitution mechanisms xanthine employs.

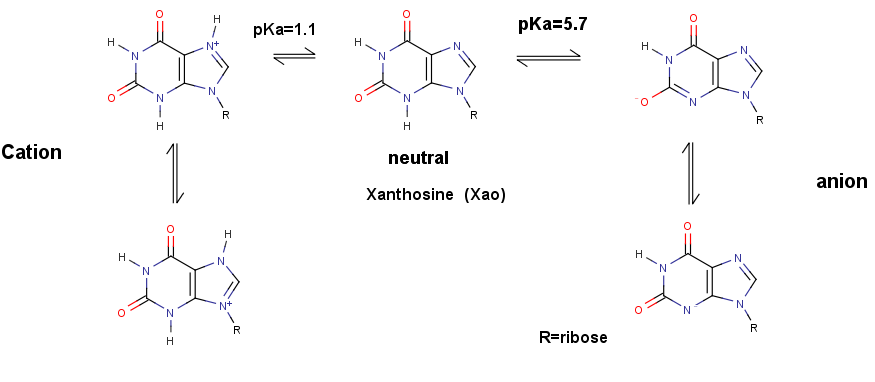
figure 7

== Applications ==
=== E.Coli ===
Using xanthosine containing culture medium can select the growth of E.coli in the presence of S.enterica colony. Because S.enterica contains enzymes that is very similar to E.coli but S.enterica doesn't encode XapA which is responsible for the catalyze of xanthosine and is found in E.coli.

=== Human ===
Xanthosine phosphorylase is a purine nucleoside phosphorylase, it involves in the purine metabolism. When human lacks PNP, toxic metabolites, deoxyguanosine triphosphate will accumulate, especially in lymphocytes. The consequence of the accumulation of toxic metabolites is the disordering function of B-cell and T-cell.
