= Nezelof syndrome =

- Other names: Thymic dysplasia with normal immunoglobulins
- Autosomal recessive is the manner in which this condition is inherited
- Specialty: Immunology
- Symptoms: Hepatosplenomegaly
- Causes: Currently unknown
- Diagnostic method: Blood test
- Treatment: Antimicrobial therapy, IV immunoglobulin

Nezelof syndrome is an autosomal recessive congenital immunodeficiency condition due to underdevelopment of the thymus. The defect is a type of purine nucleoside phosphorylase deficiency with inactive phosphorylase, this results in an accumulation of deoxy-GTP which inhibits ribonucleotide reductase. Ribonucleotide reductase catalyzes the formation of deoxyribonucleotides from ribonucleotides, thus, DNA replication is inhibited.

== Symptoms and signs ==
This condition causes severe infections. it is characterized by elevated immunoglobulins that function poorly. Other symptoms are:

- Bronchiectasis
- Hepatosplenomegaly
- Pyoderma
- Emphysema
- Diarrhea

== Cause ==
Genetically speaking, Nezelof syndrome is autosomal recessive. the condition is thought to be a variation of severe combined immunodeficiency (SCID). However, the precise cause of Nezelof syndrome remains uncertain

== Mechanism ==
In the mechanism of this condition, one first finds that the normal function of the thymus has it being important in T-cell development and release into the body's blood circulation Hassal's corpuscles absence in thymus(atrophy) has an effect on T-cells.

== Diagnosis ==
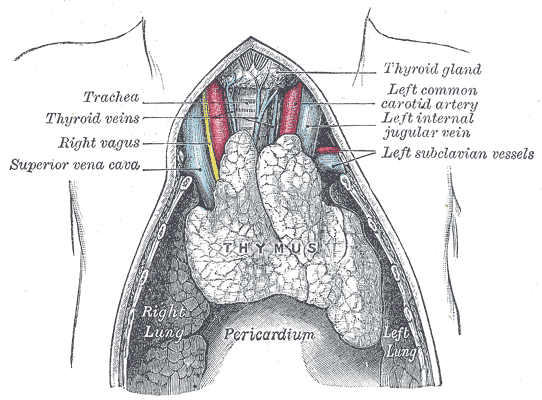
Human Thymus

The diagnosis of Nezelof syndrome will indicate a deficiency of T-cells, additionally in ascertaining the condition the following is done:

- Blood test (B-cells will be normal)
- X-ray of thymus (atrophy present)

=== Differential diagnosis ===
The differential diagnosis for this condition consists of acquired immune deficiency syndrome and severe combined immunodeficiency syndrome

== Treatment ==
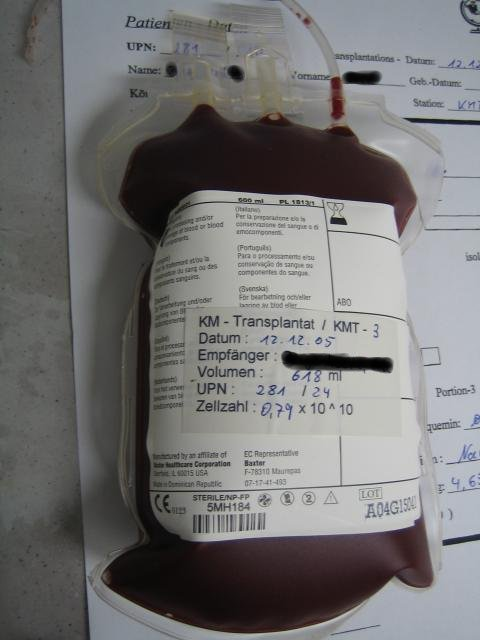
Bone marrow for transplant

In terms of treatment for individuals with Nezelof syndrome, which was first characterized in 1964, includes the following (effectiveness of bone marrow transplant is uncertain) :

- Antimicrobial therapy
- IV immunoglobulin
- Bone marrow transplantation
- Thymus transplantation
- Thymus factors

== See also ==
- List of radiographic findings associated with cutaneous conditions
