= Hypoxanthine-guanine phosphoribosyltransferase =

Enzyme that converts hypoxanthine to inosine monophosphate

HPRT1

Identifiers
- Aliases: HPRT1, HGPRT, HPRT, hypoxanthine phosphoribosyltransferase 1
- External IDs: OMIM: 308000; MGI: 96217; GeneCards: HPRT1
Available structures
PDB	Ortholog search: PDBe RCSB
PDB	List of PDB id codes 1BZY, 1D6N, 1HMP, 1Z7G, 3GEP, 3GGC, 3GGJ, 2VFA, 4IJQ, 4KN6, 4RAB, 4RAC, 4RAD, 4RAN, 4RAO, 4RAQ, 5BSK, 5BRN
Enzyme activity
EC #	BRENDA	ExPASy	KEGG	MetaCyc
2.4.2.8	↗	↗	↗	↗

Gene location (Human)
Chr.	X chromosome (human)
Band	Xq26.2-q26.3	Start	134,460,165 bp
Band	Xq26.2-q26.3	End	134,520,513 bp

Gene location (Mouse)
Chr.	X chromosome (mouse)
Band	X A5|X 29.31 cM	Start	52,077,014 bp
Band	X A5|X 29.31 cM	End	52,110,536 bp
RNA expression pattern
Bgee	Human / Mouse (ortholog); Top expressed in: oocyte; secondary oocyte; middle temporal gyrus; pons; Brodmann area 23; endothelial cell; orbitofrontal cortex; corpus epididymis; dorsolateral prefrontal cortex; lateral nuclear group of thalamus / Top expressed in: morula; morula; stroma of bone marrow; blastocyst; blastocyst; atrioventricular valve; dorsomedial hypothalamic nucleus; Epithelium of choroid plexus; facial motor nucleus; hair follicle; More reference expression data
BioGPS	More reference expression data
Gene ontology
Molecular function	transferase activity; nucleotide binding; protein homodimerization activity; glycosyltransferase activity; hypoxanthine phosphoribosyltransferase activity; guanine phosphoribosyltransferase activity; metal ion binding; protein binding; magnesium ion binding; identical protein binding
Cellular component	cytoplasm; extracellular exosome; cytosol
Biological process	purine nucleotide biosynthetic process; grooming behavior; cytolysis; purine ribonucleoside salvage; GMP catabolic process; locomotory behavior; dendrite morphogenesis; hypoxanthine metabolic process; guanine salvage; response to amphetamine; purine-containing compound salvage; nucleoside metabolic process; dopamine metabolic process; central nervous system neuron development; lymphocyte proliferation; cerebral cortex neuron differentiation; IMP metabolic process; protein homotetramerization; striatum development; hypoxanthine salvage; adenine metabolic process; positive regulation of dopamine metabolic process; adenine salvage; IMP salvage; T cell mediated cytotoxicity; GMP salvage
Sources:Amigo / QuickGO
Orthologs
Databases	NCBI: entry; OMA: entry
Species	Human	Mouse
Entrez	3251	15452
Ensembl	ENSG00000165704	ENSMUSG00000025630
UniProt	P00492	P00493
RefSeq (mRNA)	NM_000194	NM_013556
RefSeq (protein)	NP_000185	NP_038584
Location (UCSC)	Chr X: 134.46 – 134.52 Mb	Chr X: 52.08 – 52.11 Mb
PubMed search
- Wikidata
View/Edit Human	View/Edit Mouse

Hypoxanthine-guanine phosphoribosyltransferase (HGPRT) is an enzyme encoded in humans by the HPRT1 gene.

HGPRT is a transferase that catalyzes conversion of hypoxanthine to inosine monophosphate and guanine to guanosine monophosphate. This reaction transfers the 5-phosphoribosyl group from 5-phosphoribosyl 1-pyrophosphate (PRPP) to the purine. HGPRT plays a central role in the generation of purine nucleotides through the purine salvage pathway.

== Function ==
hypoxanthine phosphoribosyltransferase

Identifiers
- EC no.: 2.4.2.8
- CAS no.: 9016-12-0

Databases
- BRENDA: enzyme data
- ExPASy: NiceZyme view
- KEGG: enzyme entry
- MetaCyc: metabolic pathway
- Rhea: reactions
- PDB structures: RCSB PDB PDBe PDBsum
- Gene Ontology: AmiGO / QuickGO
Search
- PMC: articles
- PubMed: articles
- NCBI: proteins

HGPRT catalyzes the following reactions:

Substrate	Product	Notes
hypoxanthine	inosine monophosphate	—
guanine	guanosine monophosphate	Often called HGPRT. Performs this function only in some species.
xanthine	xanthosine monophosphate	Only certain HPRTs.

HGPRTase functions primarily to salvage purines from degraded DNA to reintroduce into purine synthetic pathways. In this role, it catalyzes the reaction between guanine and phosphoribosyl pyrophosphate (PRPP) to form guanosine monophosphate (GMP), giving pyrophosphoric acid (PP_{i}) as a byproduct:

PRPP
+
guanine
PP_{i}
PP_{i}
GMP

In a similar way, it converts hypoxanthine and PRPP into inosinic acid and other purines into their phosphoribose counterparts:

PPRP +
hypoxanthine
PP_{i}
PP_{i}
inosinic acid

== Substrates and inhibitors ==
Comparative homology modelling of this enzyme in L. donovani suggest that among all of the computationally screened compounds, pentamidine, 1,3-dinitroadamantane, acyclovir and analogs of acyclovir had higher binding affinities than the real substrate (guanosine monophosphate). The in silico and in-vitro correlation of these compounds were test in Leishmania HGPRT and validates the result.

== Role in disease ==
Mutations in the gene lead to hyperuricemia. At least 67 disease-causing mutations in this gene have been discovered:

- Some men have partial (up to 20% less activity of the enzyme) HGPRT deficiency that causes high levels of uric acid in the blood, which leads to the development of gouty arthritis and the formation of uric acid stones in the urinary tract. This condition has been named the Kelley–Seegmiller syndrome.
- Lesch–Nyhan syndrome is due to deficiency of HGPRT caused by HPRT1 mutation.
- Some mutations have been linked to gout, the risk of which is increased in hypoxanthine-guanine phosphoribosyltransferase deficiency.
- HPRT expression on the mRNA and protein level is induced by hypoxia inducible factor 1 (HIF1A). HIF-1 is a transcription factor that directs an array of cellular responses that are used for adaptation during oxygen deprivation. This finding implies that HPRT is a critical pathway that helps preserve the cell's purine nucleotide resources under hypoxic conditions as found in pathology such as myocardial ischemia.

== Creation of hybridomas ==
Hybridomas are immortal (immune to cellular senescence), HGPRT^{+} cells that result from fusion of mortal, HGPRT^{+} plasma cells and immortal, HGPRT^{−} myeloma cells. They are created to produce monoclonal antibodies in biotechnology. HAT medium inhibits de novo synthesis of nucleic acids, killing myeloma cells that cannot switch over to the salvage pathway, due to lack of HPRT1. The plasma cells in the culture eventually die from senescence, leaving pure hybridoma cells.
