= HAT medium =

Mammalian cell culture medium

HAT selection depicted by a plasmacytoma thymidine kinase mutant fused with a mortal splenic B-cell.

HAT Medium (hypoxanthine-aminopterin-thymidine medium) is a selection medium for mammalian cell culture, which relies on the combination of aminopterin, a drug that acts as a powerful folate metabolism inhibitor by inhibiting dihydrofolate reductase, with hypoxanthine (a purine derivative) and thymidine (a deoxynucleoside) which are intermediates in DNA synthesis. The trick is that aminopterin blocks DNA de novo synthesis, which is absolutely required for cell division to proceed, but hypoxanthine and thymidine provide cells with the raw material to evade the blockage (the "salvage pathway"), provided that they have the right enzymes, which means having functioning copies of the genes that encode them.

The enzyme dihydrofolate reductase, which produces tetrahydrofolate (THF) by the reduction of dihydrofolate, is specifically blocked by aminopterin. THF, acting in association with specific proteins, can receive single carbon units that are then transferred to specific targets.

One of the important targets for cellular reproduction is thymidylate synthase, which creates thymidine monophosphate (TMP) from deoxyuridine monophosphate (dUMP). By additional phosphorylation reactions, TMP can be used to make thymidine triphosphate (TTP), one of the four nucleotide precursors that are used by DNA polymerases to create DNA. Without the THF required to convert dUMP, there can be no TTP, and DNA synthesis cannot proceed, unless TMP can be produced from another source. The alternative source is the thymidine present in the HAT medium that can be absorbed by the cells and phosphorylated by thymidine kinase (TK) into TMP.

The synthesis of IMP, (precursor to GMP and GTP, and to AMP and ATP) also requires THF, and also can be bypassed. In this case hypoxanthine-guanine phosphoribosyltransferase (HGPRT) reacts hypoxanthine absorbed from the medium with PRPP, liberating pyrophosphate, to produce IMP by a salvage pathway.

Therefore, the use of HAT medium for cell culture is a form of artificial selection for cells containing working TK and HGPRT. Many useful refinements to the scheme are made possible by poisons that kill cells, but to which they are immune if they lack one of these genes. Thus, a cell lacking TK is resistant to bromodeoxyuridine (BrdU) and a cell lacking HGPRT is resistant to 6-thioguanine (6-TG) and 8-azaguanine. Thus, selection with one of the latter two drugs, followed by HAT medium, will yield revertant colonies.

== Applications ==
HAT medium is used for preparation of monoclonal antibodies. Laboratory animals (e.g., mice) are first exposed to an antigen against which we are interested in isolating an antibody. Once splenocytes are isolated from the mammal, the B cells are fused with HGPRT negative, immortalized myeloma cells using polyethylene glycol or the Sendai virus. Fused cells are incubated in the HAT medium. Aminopterin in the medium blocks the de novo pathway. Hence, unfused myeloma cells die, as they cannot produce nucleotides by the de novo or salvage pathway. Unfused B cells die as they have a short lifespan. In this way, only the B cell-myeloma hybrids survive. These cells produce antibodies (a property of B cells) and are immortal (a property of myeloma cells). The incubated medium is then diluted into multiwell plates to such an extent that each well contains only 1 cell. Then the supernatant in each well can be checked for the desired antibody. Since the antibodies in a well are produced by the same B cell, they will be directed towards the same epitope, and are known as monoclonal antibodies.

The production of monoclonal antibodies was first invented by César Milstein and Georges J. F. Köhler, which earned them the 1984 Nobel Prize in Physiology or Medicine, shared with Niels Kaj Jerne.
