= Pyrimidine-nucleoside phosphorylase =

Class of enzymes

Identifiers
- EC no.: 2.4.2.2
- CAS no.: 9055-35-0

Databases
- BRENDA: enzyme data
- ExPASy: NiceZyme view
- KEGG: enzyme entry
- MetaCyc: metabolic pathway
- Rhea: reactions
- PDB structures: RCSB PDB PDBe PDBsum
- Gene Ontology: AmiGO / QuickGO
Search
- PMC: articles
- PubMed: articles
- NCBI: proteins

Pyrimidine-nucleoside phosphorylase (EC 2.4.2.2) is an enzyme that catalyzes several phosphorolysis reactions which convert a pyrimidine nucleoside into the corresponding pyrimidine, by cleavage of the α-D-ribose 1-phosphate sugar unit:

a pyrimidine nucleoside + phosphate (P_{i}) $\rightleftharpoons$ α-D-ribose 1-phosphate + a pyrimidine base

For example, uridine gives uracil:

uridine
P_{i}
P_{i}
ribose 1-phosphate
+
uracil

The reaction is reversible, so this is also how the pyrimidine nucleosides uridine, cytidine, 2'-deoxyuridine, and thymidine can be made in the bacterium Bacillus stearothermophilus in which the enzyme was characterised. It has also been described from Enterobacter aerogenes.

This enzyme belongs to the family of glycosyltransferases, specifically the pentosyltransferases. The systematic name of this enzyme class is pyrimidine-nucleoside:phosphate alpha-D-ribosyltransferase. This enzyme is also called Py-NPase.

== Structural studies ==
As of late 2007, two structures have been solved for this class of enzymes, with PDB accession codes PDB: 1BRW and PDB: 2DSJ.
