= UCKL1 =

Protein-coding gene in the species Homo sapiens

Identifiers
- Aliases: UCKL1, UCK1-LIKE, UCK1L, URKL1, uridine-cytidine kinase 1 like 1
- External IDs: OMIM: 610866; MGI: 1915806; GeneCards: UCKL1
Enzyme activity
EC #	BRENDA	ExPASy	KEGG	MetaCyc
2.7.1.48	↗	↗	↗	↗

Gene location (Human)
Chr.	Chromosome 20 (human)
Band	20q13.33	Start	63,939,829 bp
Band	20q13.33	End	63,956,416 bp

Gene location (Mouse)
Chr.	Chromosome 2 (mouse)
Band	2|2 H4	Start	181,210,942 bp
Band	2|2 H4	End	181,226,685 bp
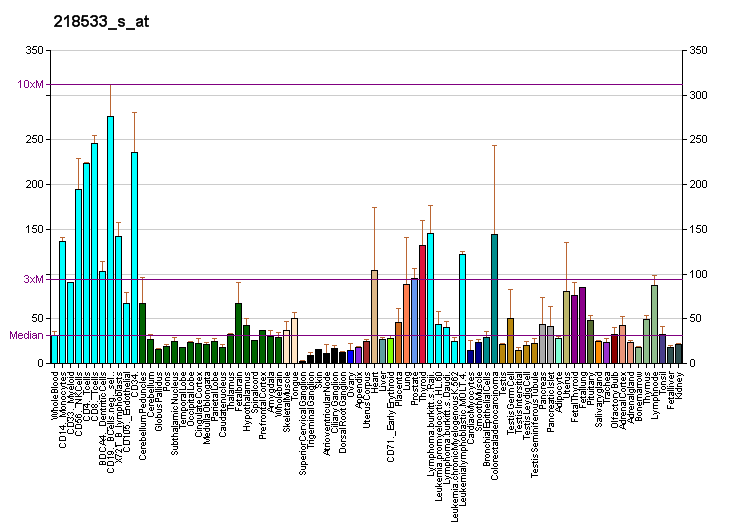
RNA expression pattern
Bgee	Human / Mouse (ortholog); Top expressed in: right hemisphere of cerebellum; right uterine tube; apex of heart; left ovary; right ovary; canal of the cervix; muscle of thigh; right lobe of thyroid gland; left lobe of thyroid gland; ectocervix / Top expressed in: neural layer of retina; granulocyte; muscle of thigh; superior frontal gyrus; right kidney; epithelium of lens; proximal tubule; thymus; lip; primary visual cortex; More reference expression data
BioGPS	More reference expression data
Gene ontology
Molecular function	transferase activity; nucleotide binding; protein binding; ATP binding; kinase activity; uridine kinase activity
Cellular component	cytoplasm; nucleus; cytosol
Biological process	metabolism; viral process; pyrimidine nucleobase metabolic process; UMP salvage; CTP salvage; phosphorylation; nucleoside metabolic process; pyrimidine nucleoside salvage
Sources:Amigo / QuickGO
Orthologs
Databases	NCBI: entry; OMA: entry
Species	Human	Mouse
Entrez	54963	68556
Ensembl	ENSG00000198276	ENSMUSG00000089917
UniProt	Q9NWZ5	Q91YL3
RefSeq (mRNA)	NM_001193379; NM_017859; NM_001353475; NM_001353476; NM_001353477 NM_001353478; NM_001353479; NM_001353480; NM_001353481; NM_001353482	NM_026765; NM_001379005
RefSeq (protein)	NP_001180308; NP_060329; NP_001340404; NP_001340405; NP_001340406 NP_001340407; NP_001340408; NP_001340409; NP_001340410; NP_001340411	NP_081041; NP_001365934
Location (UCSC)	Chr 20: 63.94 – 63.96 Mb	Chr 2: 181.21 – 181.23 Mb
PubMed search
- Wikidata
View/Edit Human	View/Edit Mouse

Uridine-cytidine kinase-like 1 is an enzyme that in humans is encoded by the UCKL1 gene.
