= 8-Azaguanine =

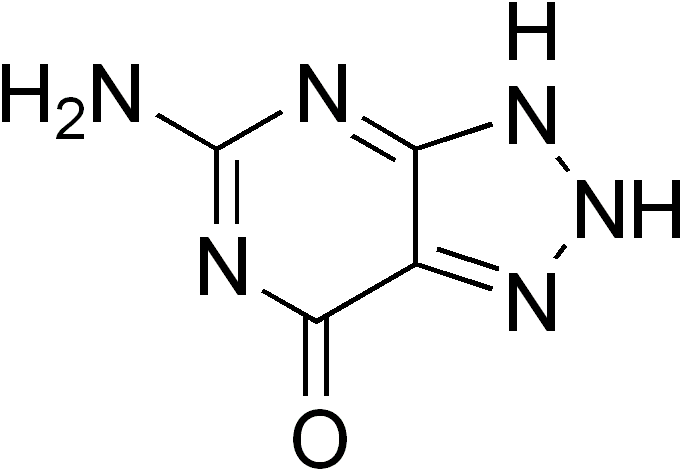

Names
- IUPAC names 5-amino-2,3-dihydrotriazolo[4,5-d]pyrimidin-7-one; 5-amino-1,4-dihydro-7H-1,2,3-triazolo[4,5-d]pyrimidin-7-one; 3-amino-2,4,7,8,9-pentazabicyclo[4.3.0]nona-1,3,6-trien-5-one

Identifiers
| CAS Number | 134-58-7 |
| 3D model (JSmol) | Interactive image |
| ChEBI | CHEBI:63486 |
| ChEMBL | ChEMBL374107 |
| ChemSpider | 8325 |
| DrugBank | DB01667 |
| ECHA InfoCard | 100.004.681 |
| EC Number | 205-148-1 |
| PubChem CID | 135403646 |
| RTECS number | XZ6157000 |
| UNII | Q150359I72 |
| CompTox Dashboard (EPA) | DTXSID0074508 |
- InChI: InChI=1S/C4H4N6O/c5-4-6-2-1(3(11)7-4)8-10-9-2/h(H4,5,6,7,8,9,10,11) Key: LPXQRXLUHJKZIE-UHFFFAOYSA-N; InChI=1/C4H4N6O/c5-4-6-2-1(3(11)7-4)8-10-9-2/h(H4,5,6,7,8,9,10,11) Key: LPXQRXLUHJKZIE-UHFFFAOYAO
- SMILES: C12=NNNC1=NC(=NC2=O)N

Properties
| Chemical formula | C_{4}H_{4}N_{6}O |
| Molar mass | 152.117 g·mol^{−1} |
| Appearance | white to off-white crystalline powder |
| Density | 2.64 g/cm^{3} |
| Melting point | > 300 °C (decomp.) |
| Solubility in water | Insoluble |

Hazards
| Flash point | 129.1 °C (264.4 °F; 402.2 K) |
- Except where otherwise noted, data are given for materials in their standard state (at 25 °C [77 °F], 100 kPa). verify (what is ?) Infobox references

8-Azaguanine is a purine analog with the chemical formula C_{4}H_{4}N_{6}O. It has been widely studied for its biological activity. It shows antineoplastic activity and has been used in the treatment of acute leukemia.

== Use in chemotherapy ==
The compound closely resembles guanine and appears to be competitive with it in the metabolism of living organisms. It has been shown to cause retardation of some malignant neoplasms when administered to tumors in animals. 8-Azaguanine was the first purine analogue discovered to inhibit experimental tumors in mice.

== Synonyms ==
- 2-Amino-6-hydroxy-8-azapurine
- 2-Amino-6-oxy-8-azapurine
- 5-Amino-1,4-dihydro-7H-1,2,3-triazolo(4,5-d)pyrimidin-7-one
- 5-Amino-1,6-dihydro-7H-v-triazolo(4,5-d)pyrimidin-7-one
- 5-Amino-1H-triazolo(4,5-d)pyrimidin-7-ol
- 5-Amino-1H-v-triazolo(d)pyrimidin-7-ol
- 5-Amino-1H-(1,2,3)Triazolo(4,5-d)pyrimidin-7-ol
- 5-Amino-7-hydroxy-1H-v-triazolo(d)pyrimidine
- 7H-1,2,3-Triazolo(4,5-d)pyrimidin-7-one, 5-amino-1,4-dihydro- (9CI)
- 7H-1,2,3-Triazolo(4,5-d)pyrimidinone, 5-amino-1,4-dihydro-
- 7H-v-Triazolo(4,5-d)pyrimidin-7-one, 5-amino-1,6-dihydro-
- 8 AG
- 8azaG
- Azaguanine
- Azaguanine-8
- Azan
- AZG
- B-28
- Guanazol
- Guanazolo
- NSC-749
- Pathocidin
- Pathocidine
- SF-337
- SK 1150
- Triazologuanine
- v-Triazolo(4,5-d)pyrimidin-7-ol,5-amino-

* Sources:
