= Nucleotide salvage =

Biological process

A salvage pathway is a pathway in which a biological product is produced from intermediates in the degradative pathway of its own or a similar substance. The term often refers to nucleotide salvage in particular, in which nucleotides (purine and pyrimidine) are synthesized from intermediates in their degradative pathway.

Nucleotide salvage pathways are used to recover bases and nucleosides that are formed during degradation of RNA and DNA. This is important in some organs because some tissues cannot undergo de novo synthesis. The salvaged products can then be converted back into nucleotides. Salvage pathways are targets for drug development, one family being called antifolates.

A number of other biologically-important substances, like methionine and nicotinate, have their own salvage pathways to recycle parts of the molecule.

== Substrates ==
The nucleotide salvage pathway requires distinct substrates:

=== Pyrimidines ===
Uridine phosphorylase or pyrimidine-nucleoside phosphorylase substitutes the anomeric-carbon-bonded phosphate of ribose 1-phosphate for the free base uracil, forming the nucleoside uridine. Uridine kinase (aka uridine–cytidine kinase) can then phosphorylate the 5’-carbon of this nucleoside into uridine monophosphate (UMP). UMP/CMP kinase (EC 2.7.4.14) can phosphorylate UMP into uridine diphosphate, which nucleoside diphosphate kinase can phosphorylate into uridine triphosphate.

Thymidine phosphorylase or pyrimidine-nucleoside phosphorylase adds 2-deoxy-alpha-D-ribose 1-phosphate to thymine, with thymine bonding at the anomeric carbon of the deoxyribose, forming the deoxynucleoside thymidine. Thymidine kinase can then phosphorylate the 5’-carbon of this compound into thymidine monophosphate (TMP). Thymidylate kinase can phosphorylate TMP into thymidine diphosphate, which nucleoside diphosphate kinase can phosphorylate into thymidine triphosphate.

The nucleosides cytidine and deoxycytidine can be salvaged along the uracil pathway by cytidine deaminase, which converts them to uridine and deoxyuridine, respectively. Alternatively, uridine–cytidine kinase can phosphorylate them into cytidine monophosphate (CMP) or deoxycytidine monophosphate (dCMP). UMP/CMP kinase can phosphorylate (d)CMP into cytidine diphosphate or deoxycytidine diphosphate, which nucleoside diphosphate kinase can phosphorylate into cytidine triphosphate or deoxycytidine triphosphate.

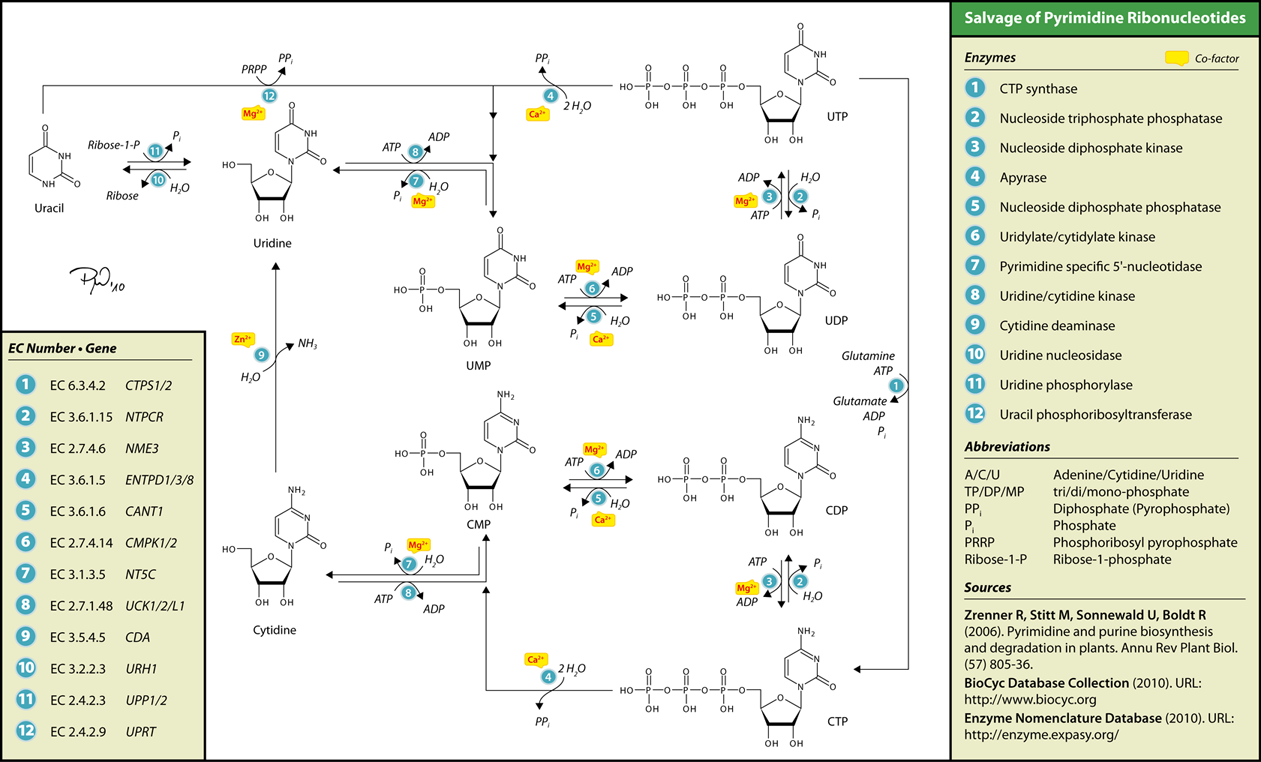
The salvage of pyrimidine ribonucleotides.

=== Purines ===
Phosphoribosyltransferases add activated ribose-5-phosphate (Phosphoribosyl pyrophosphate, PRPP) to bases, creating nucleoside monophosphates. There are two types of phosphoribosyltransferases: adenine phosphoribosyltransferase (APRT) and hypoxanthine-guanine phosphoribosyltransferase (HGPRT). HGPRT is an important enzyme in Purine pathway metabolism and its deficiency is implicated in Lesch–Nyhan syndrome.

Nucleobase	Enzyme	Nucleotide
hypoxanthine	hypoxanthine/guanine phosphoribosyl transferase (HGPRT)	IMP
guanine	hypoxanthine/guanine phosphoribosyl transferase (HGPRT)	GMP
adenine	adenine phosphoribosyltransferase (APRT)	AMP

== Folate biosynthesis ==
Tetrahydrofolic acid and its derivatives are produced by salvage pathways from GTP.

== Other salvage pathways ==
L-methionine salvage is the pathway that regenerates methionine from its downstream products. A version of the pathway uses methylthioadenosine (MTA), forming the so-called MTA cycle with its synthesizing reaction. This sulphur-recycling action is found in humans, and seems to be universal among aerobic life.

Nicotinate salvage is the process of regenerating nicotinamide adenine dinucleotide from nicotinic acid. This pathway is important for controlling the level of oxidative stress in cells. The human gene NAPRT encodes the main enzyme in the pathway. Cancer cells, which have increased NAD requirements, tend to upregulate the pathway.

Salvage pathways also exist for ceramide, cobalamin, cell wall components, and tetrahydrobiopterin in various organisms.
