= Uridine phosphorylase =

Class of enzymes

Identifiers
- EC no.: 2.4.2.3
- CAS no.: 9030-22-2

Databases
- IntEnz: IntEnz view
- BRENDA: BRENDA entry
- ExPASy: NiceZyme view
- KEGG: KEGG entry
- MetaCyc: metabolic pathway
- PRIAM: profile
- PDB structures: RCSB PDB PDBe PDBsum
- Gene Ontology: AmiGO / QuickGO
Search
- PMC: articles
- PubMed: articles
- NCBI: proteins

Uridine phosphorylase (EC 2.4.2.3) is an enzyme that catalyzes a phosphorolysis reaction which converts the pyrimidine nucleotide, uridine, into uracil, by cleavage of the α-D-ribose 1-phosphate sugar unit:

uridine
P_{i}
ribose-1-phosphate
+
uracil

This is part of a salvage pathway that allows the organisms in which the enzyme occurs to recycle the nucleotide into its component parts. The enzyme has been characterised in Escherichia coli and humans.

This enzyme belongs to the family of glycosyltransferases, specifically the pentosyltransferases. The systematic name of this enzyme class is uridine:phosphate alpha-D-ribosyltransferase. Other names in common use include pyrimidine phosphorylase, UrdPase, UPH, and UPase.

== Structural studies ==
As of late 2007, 27 structures have been solved for this class of enzymes, with PDB accession codes 1K3F, 1LX7, 1RXC, 1RXS, 1RXU, 1RXY, 1RYZ, 1SJ9, 1SQ6, 1T0U, 1TGV, 1TGY, 1U1C, 1U1D, 1U1E, 1U1F, 1U1G, 1Y1Q, 1Y1R, 1Y1S, 1Y1T, 1ZL2, 2HN9, 2HRD, 2HSW, 2HWU, and 2I8A.
