= UCK2 =

Protein found in humans

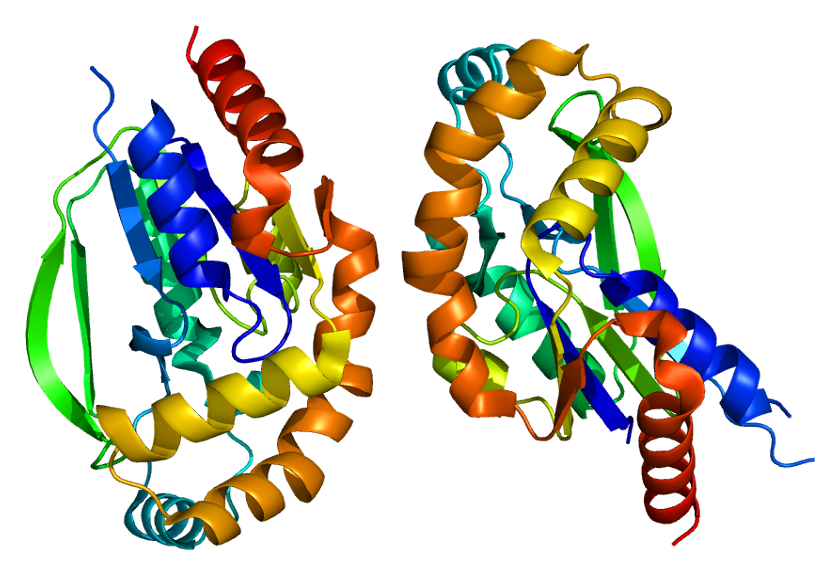

Identifiers
- Aliases: UCK2, TSA903, UK, UMPK, uridine-cytidine kinase 2
- External IDs: OMIM: 609329; MGI: 1931744; GeneCards: UCK2
Available structures
| PDB | Ortholog search: PDBe RCSB |
| PDB | List of PDB id codes 1UDW, 1UEI, 1UEJ, 1UFQ, 1UJ2, 1XRJ |
Enzyme activity
| EC # | BRENDA | ExPASy | KEGG | MetaCyc |
|---|---|---|---|---|
| 2.7.1.48 | ↗ | ↗ | ↗ | ↗ |

Gene location (Human)
| Chr. | Chromosome 1 (human) |
| Band | 1q24.1 | Start | 165,827,614 bp |
| Band | 1q24.1 | End | 165,911,618 bp |

Gene location (Mouse)
| Chr. | Chromosome 1 (mouse) |
| Band | 1|1 H2.3 | Start | 167,050,452 bp |
| Band | 1|1 H2.3 | End | 167,112,889 bp |
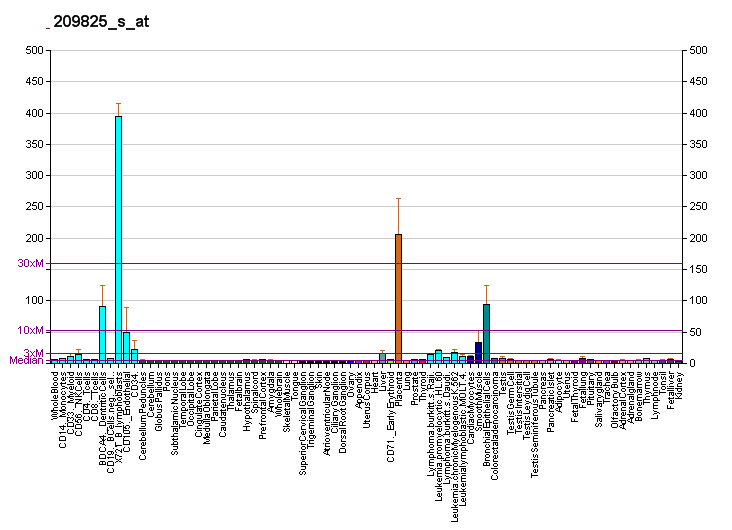
RNA expression pattern
| Bgee | Human / Mouse (ortholog); Top expressed in: mucosa of transverse colon; ventricular zone; ganglionic eminence; stromal cell of endometrium; placenta; rectum; mucosa of esophagus; cartilage tissue; testicle; minor salivary glands / Top expressed in: ectoderm; otic placode; otic vesicle; epiblast; hair follicle; lacrimal gland; epithelium of stomach; lumbar spinal ganglion; mandibular prominence; maxillary prominence; More reference expression data |
| BioGPS | More reference expression data |
Gene ontology
| Molecular function | transferase activity; nucleotide binding; nucleoside kinase activity; uridine kinase activity; ATP binding; kinase activity |
| Cellular component | cytosol; cellular component |
| Biological process | pyrimidine nucleoside salvage; CMP salvage; metabolism; UMP salvage; CTP salvage; phosphorylation; pyrimidine nucleobase metabolic process |
Sources:Amigo / QuickGO
Orthologs
| Databases | NCBI: entry; OMA: entry |
| Species | Human | Mouse |
| Entrez | 7371 | 80914 |
| Ensembl | ENSG00000143179 | ENSMUSG00000026558 |
| UniProt | Q9BZX2 | Q99PM9 |
| RefSeq (mRNA) | NM_012474; NM_001363568 | NM_030724 |
| RefSeq (protein) | NP_036606; NP_001350497 | NP_109649 |
| Location (UCSC) | Chr 1: 165.83 – 165.91 Mb | Chr 1: 167.05 – 167.11 Mb |
| PubMed search |
- Wikidata
| View/Edit Human | View/Edit Mouse |

Uridine-cytidine kinase 2 (UCK2) is an enzyme that in humans is encoded by the UCK2 gene.

The protein encoded by this gene catalyzes the phosphorylation of uridine and cytidine to uridine monophosphate (UMP) and cytidine monophosphate (CMP), respectively. This is the first step in the production of the pyrimidine nucleoside triphosphates required for RNA and DNA synthesis. In addition, an allele of this gene may play a role in mediating nonhumoral immunity to Hemophilus influenzae type B.

== Structure and mechanism ==
Uridine-cytidine kinase 2 is a tetramer with molecular mass of about 112 kDa. In the UCK2 monomer, the active site is composed of a five-stranded β-sheet, surrounded by five α-helices and a β-hairpin loop. The β-hairpin loop in particular forms a significant portion of a deep binding pocket for the uridine/cytidine substrate to moderate binding and release of substrate and products. Binding specificity for nucleosides is determined by the His-117 and Tyr-112 residues, which hydrogen bond with the 4-amino group or the 6-oxo group of cytidine and uridine, respectively. A magnesium ion is coordinated in the active site by Glu-135, Ser-34, and Asp-62.

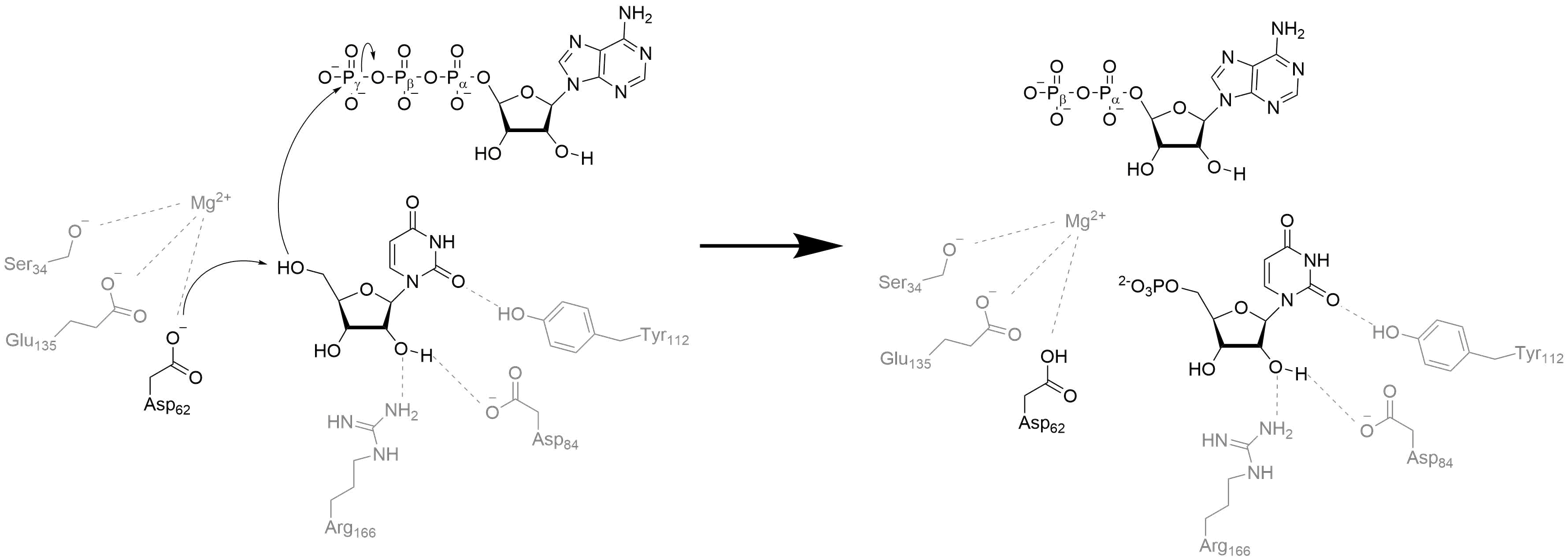
Mechanism for uridine phosphorylation in the active site of UCK2

The Asp-62 residue is responsible for the catalytic activity in the enzyme active site; the acidic side chain of the Asp-62 residue deprotonates the 5'-hydroxyl group on the substrate and activates it to attack the γ-phosphorus of ATP. Structural analyses have shown that the side chain of the catalytic Asp-62 changes conformation before and after the reaction. It has been suggested that this conformational change occurs following phosphorylation, with the negatively charged Asp-62 moving away from the newly attached 5'-phosphate of the UMP/CMP product.

== Substrate specificity ==
Though uridine and cytidine are the physiologically preferred substrates for the enzyme, UCK2 has been shown to phosphorylate other nucleoside analogues. Examples of successfully phosphorylated substrates include 6-azauridine, 5-azacytidine, 4-thiouridine, 5-fluorocytidine, and 5-hydroxyuridine. Alternatively to ATP, GTP has been shown to act comparably as a phosphate donor. This promiscuity enables the important role for UCK2 as an in vivo activator of clinically active nucleoside prodrugs, such as cylcopentenylcytidine.

Despite flexibility for different nucleoside analogs, UCK is unique among other nucleic acid kinases in its specificity for ribose analogs over 2'-deoxyribose forms; whereas other proteins in the NMP kinase family will indiscriminately phosphorylate both deoxyribonucleosides and ribonucleosides, UCK2 only accepts ribonucleosides. This unique selectivity can be induced fit mechanisms and structural features that are unique to UCK2 among the NMP kinase family. Studies have shown that the binding of the cytidine/uridine sugar moiety results in the conformational change to reduce the distance between the His-117 and Arg-176 residues. Without the 2'-hydroxyl group on the sugar moiety, hydrogen bonding with Asp-84 and Arg-166 will be greatly reduced, resulting in diminished conformational change and weakened substrate binding.

== Physiological role ==
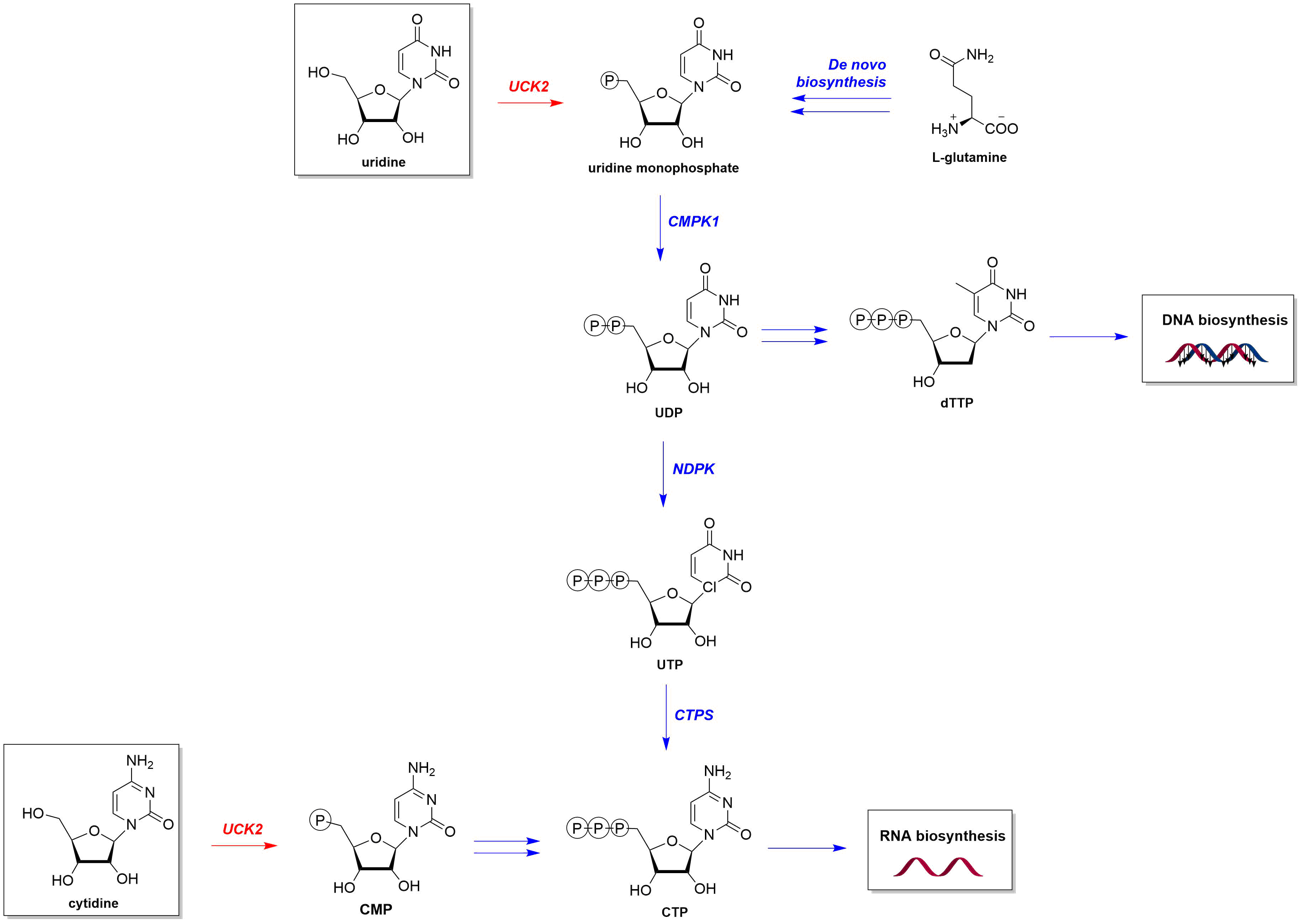
Schematic for role of UCK2 in pyrimidine salvage

UCK2 is one of two human uridine-cytidine kinases. The other UCK protein is uridine-cytidine kinase 1, which shares about 70% sequence identity with UCK2. While UCK1 is expressed ubiquitously in a variety of healthy tissues including the liver, skeletal muscle, and heart, UCK2 has only been detected in placental tissue. UCK2, however, is of particular scientific interest due to its overexpression in tumor cell lines, which makes it a target in anti-cancer treatments.

Studies determining the Michaelis–Menten kinetic parameters for these enzymes revealed that UCK2 had a four to sixfold higher binding affinity, faster maximal rates, and greater efficiencies for uridine and cytidine substrates than did UCK1.

Both uridine-cytidine kinases, however, plays a crucial role in the biosynthesis of the pyrimidine nucleotides that compose RNA and DNA. Pyrimidine biosynthesis can occur through two pathways: de novo synthesis, which relies on L-glutamine as the pathway precursor, and salvage, which recycles cellular uridine and cytidine. UCK2 catalyzes the first step of pyrimidine salvage, and is the rate limiting enzyme in the pathway.

== Disease relevance ==
UCK1 is expressed ubiquitously in healthy tissue, but found in low levels in tumor tissues. Conversely, UCK2 has been detected mostly in cancerous cells and healthy placental tissue. The selective expression in target tissues has resulted in the identification of UCK2 as a target in anti-cancer therapies.

One strategy for anti-cancer and anti-viral therapies involves using UCK2 to activate anti-tumor prodrugs through phosphorylation. As an example, 1-(3-C-ethynyl-β-D-ribopentofuranosyl)cytosine (ECyd) and 1-(3-C-ethynyl-β-D-ribopentofuranosyl)uridine (EUrd) are RNA polymerase inhibitors that are under investigation for use as anticancer drugs. The nucleoside, however, only gains its clinical activity after three phosphorylations; therefore, UCK2 plays a key role in initiating the activation of the drug. An alternate strategy involves inhibition of UCK2 to block pyrimidine salvage in cancerous cells. In certain cancer cell lines, pyrimidine biosynthesis primarily occurs through the salvage pathway. Blocking pyrimidine salvage can prevent DNA and RNA biosynthesis, resulting in reduced cell proliferation.

Additionally, research indicates that inhibiting UCK2 can interfere with ribosomal biogenesis, triggering nucleolar stress and activating apoptotic signaling pathways. In response to this stress, ribosomal proteins are released from the nucleolus and bind to MDM2, a protein that regulates p53. by preventing MDM2-mediated p53 ubiquitination, UCK2 inhibition can activate p53, a tumor suppressor that induces apoptosis in cancer cells.

Several studies have demonstrated that UCK2 is overexpressed in variety of cancer types and this overexpression is associated with poor prognosis and reduced survival rates. For example, UCK2 is overexpressed in the early stages of lung cancer, suggesting that its potential use as a biomarker for early diagnosis.

UCK2 can promote cancer cell proliferation through mechanisms independent of its catalytic activity or metabolic function. It appears to activate oncogenic pathways, such as STAT3 and enzymes like MMP2 and MMP9, which contribute to enhanced cell proliferation and metastasis.

Click on genes, proteins and metabolites below to link to respective articles. (Note: The interactive pathway map can be edited at WikiPathways: "FluoropyrimidineActivity_WP1601".)

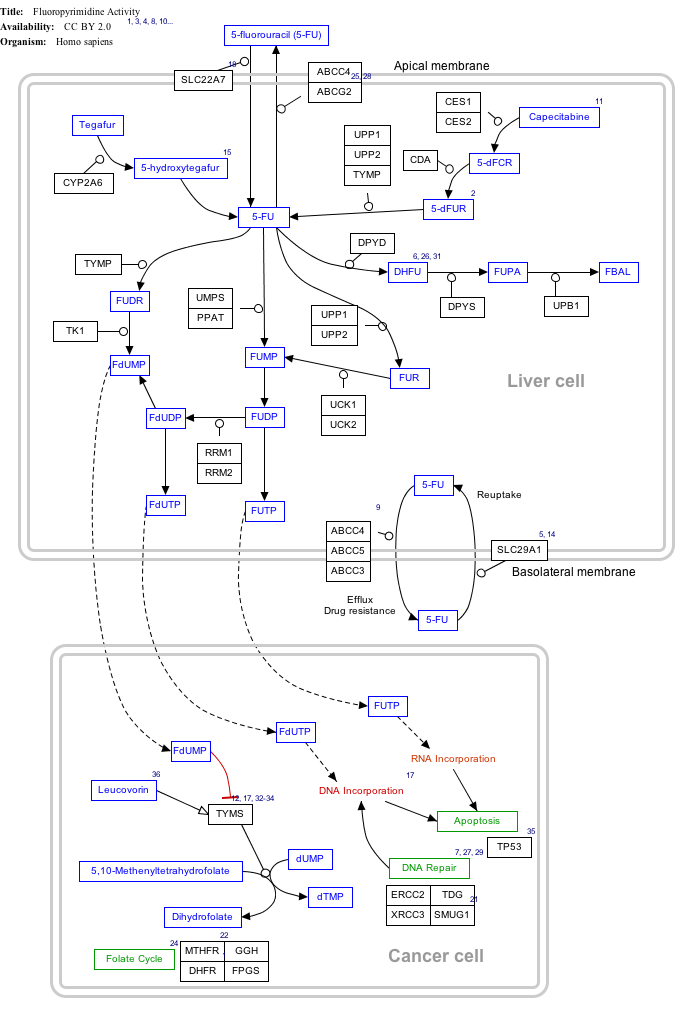

Fluorouracil (5-FU) Activity edit
