= S416 =

Chemical compound

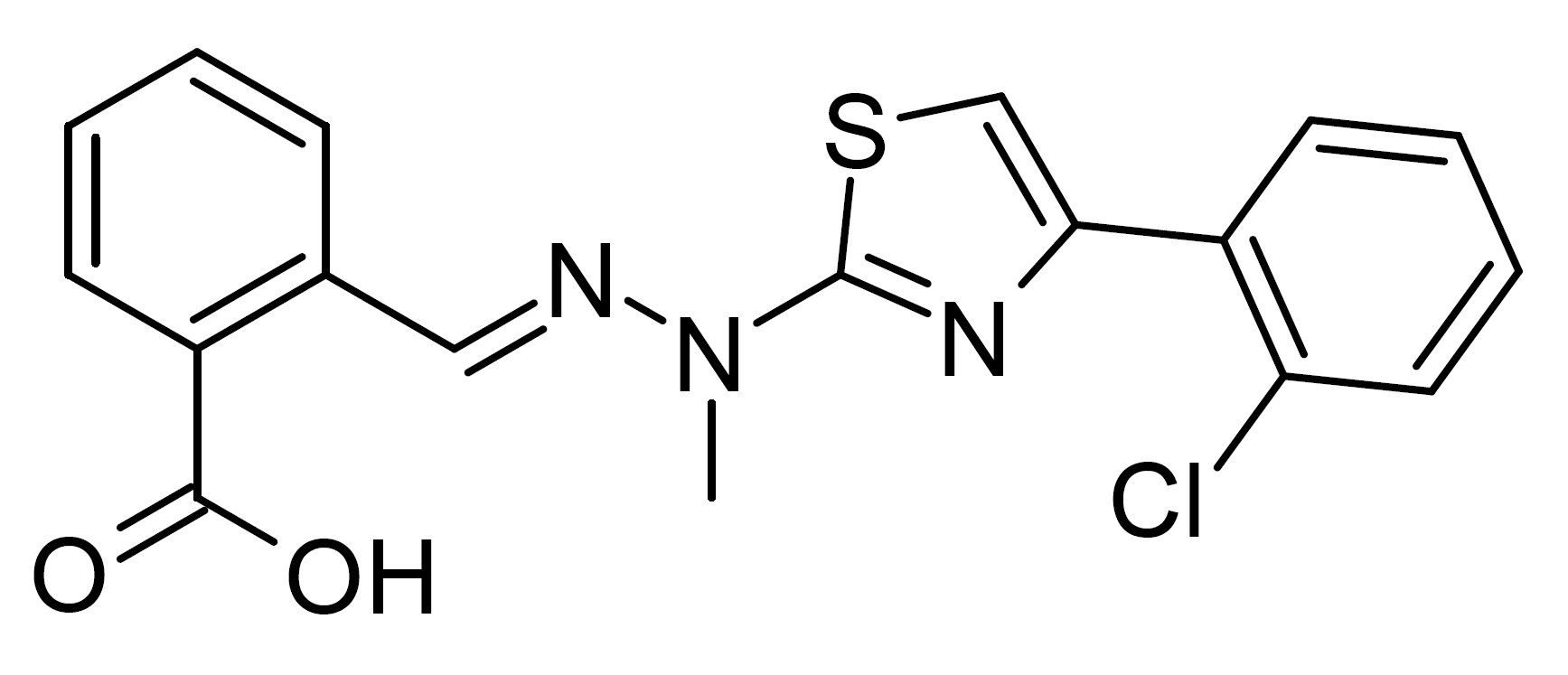

Identifiers
- IUPAC name: 2-[(E)-[[4-(2-chlorophenyl)-1,3-thiazol-2-yl]-methylhydrazinylidene}]methyl]benzoic acid
- CAS Number: 2118370-02-6
- PubChem CID: 148568163
- CompTox Dashboard (EPA): DTXSID901337017

Chemical and physical data
- Formula: C_{18}H_{14}ClN_{3}O_{2}S
- Molar mass: 371.84 g·mol^{−1}
- 3D model (JSmol): Interactive image
- SMILES: CN(C1=NC(=CS1)C2=CC=CC=C2Cl)/N=C\C3=CC=CC=C3C(=O)O
- InChI: InChI=1S/C18H14ClN3O2S/c1-22(20-10-12-6-2-3-7-13(12)17(23)24)18-21-16(11-25-18)14-8-4-5-9-15(14)19/h2-11H,1H3,(H,23,24)/b20-10-; Key:MWIQPUXVXAVFRM-JMIUGGIZSA-N

S416 (GTPL-11164) is a drug which acts as a selective inhibitor of the enzyme dihydroorotate dehydrogenase (DHODH). This enzyme is involved in the synthesis of pyrimidine nucleosides in the body, which are required for the synthesis of DNA and RNA. This is an important rate-limiting step in the replication of viruses, and so DHODH inhibitors may have applications as broad-spectrum antiviral drugs. In tests in vitro, S416 was found to have antiviral activity against a range of pathogenic RNA viruses including influenza, Zika virus, Ebola virus and SARS-CoV-2.

== See also ==
- Brequinar
- Teriflunomide
- Leflunomide
