= Nuclear receptor 4A1 =

Mammalian protein found in Homo sapiens

NR4A1
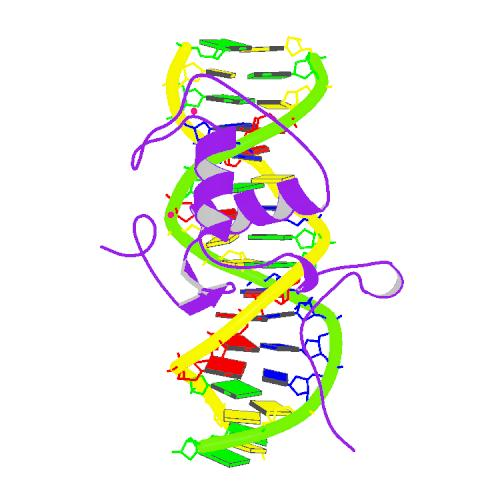

Identifiers
- Aliases: NR4A1, GFRP1, HMR, N10, NAK-1, NGFIB, NP10, NUR77, TR3, nuclear receptor subfamily 4 group A member 1, NH41
- External IDs: OMIM: 139139; MGI: 1352454; GeneCards: NR4A1
Available structures
PDB	Ortholog search: PDBe RCSB
PDB	List of PDB id codes 2QW4, 3V3E, 3V3Q, 4JGV, 4KZI, 4KZJ, 4KZM, 4RZE, 4RZF, 4RZG, 4RE8, 4REE, 4REF, 4WHF, 4WHG

Gene location (Human)
Chr.	Chromosome 12 (human)
Band	12q13.13	Start	52,022,832 bp
Band	12q13.13	End	52,059,507 bp

Gene location (Mouse)
Chr.	Chromosome 15 (mouse)
Band	15|15 F1	Start	101,152,150 bp
Band	15|15 F1	End	101,172,676 bp
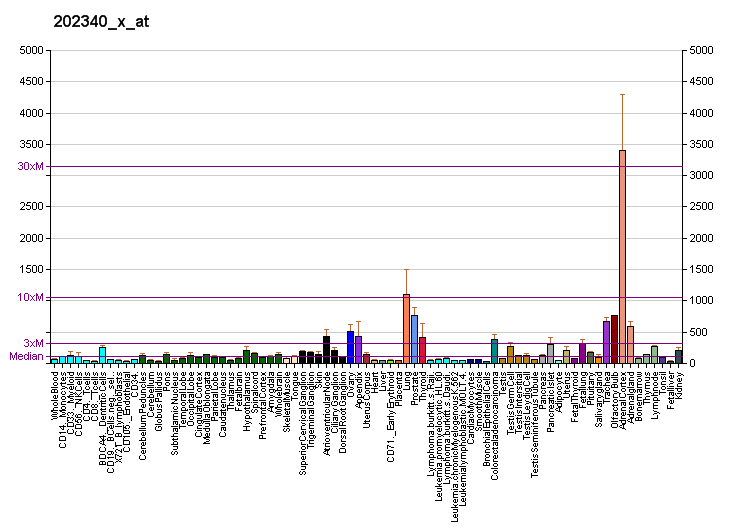

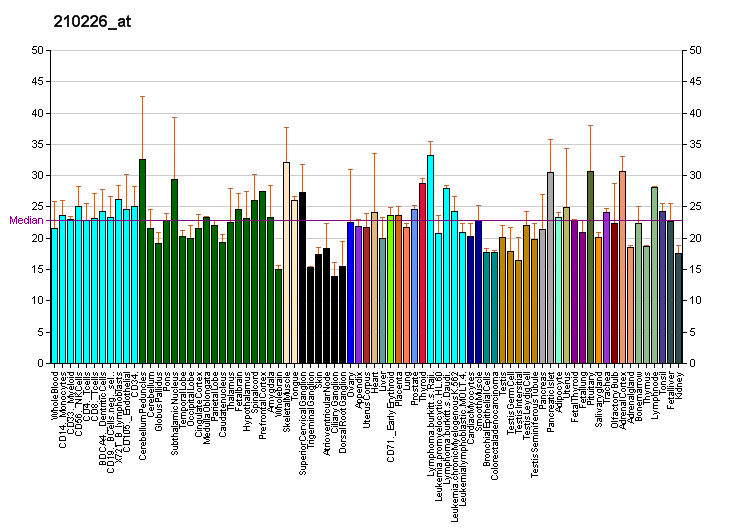
RNA expression pattern
Bgee	Human / Mouse (ortholog); Top expressed in: gastric mucosa; left uterine tube; gallbladder; left ovary; tibial nerve; popliteal artery; tibial arteries; right ovary; muscle of thigh; vena cava / Top expressed in: granulocyte; adrenal gland; plantaris muscle; triceps brachii muscle; vastus lateralis muscle; tibialis anterior muscle; extensor digitorum longus muscle; muscle of thigh; parotid gland; medial head of gastrocnemius muscle; More reference expression data
BioGPS	More reference expression data
Gene ontology
Molecular function	DNA binding; sequence-specific DNA binding; DNA-binding transcription factor activity; zinc ion binding; DNA-binding transcription activator activity, RNA polymerase II-specific; metal ion binding; steroid hormone receptor activity; nuclear receptor activity; protein binding; protein heterodimerization activity; DNA-binding transcription factor activity, RNA polymerase II-specific; RNA polymerase II transcription regulatory region sequence-specific DNA binding; RNA polymerase II cis-regulatory region sequence-specific DNA binding; glucocorticoid receptor binding
Cellular component	nuclear membrane; nucleoplasm; nucleus; cytoplasm; cytosol; transcription regulator complex
Biological process	regulation of transcription, DNA-templated; positive regulation of endothelial cell proliferation; negative regulation of cell cycle; cellular response to fibroblast growth factor stimulus; transcription, DNA-templated; cell migration involved in sprouting angiogenesis; endothelial cell chemotaxis; cellular response to corticotropin-releasing hormone stimulus; cellular response to vascular endothelial growth factor stimulus; transcription initiation from RNA polymerase II promoter; fat cell differentiation; regulation of type B pancreatic cell proliferation; signal transduction; steroid hormone mediated signaling pathway; positive regulation of transcription by RNA polymerase II; intracellular receptor signaling pathway
Sources:Amigo / QuickGO
Orthologs
Databases	NCBI: entry; OMA: entry
Species	Human	Mouse
Entrez	3164	15370
Ensembl	ENSG00000123358	ENSMUSG00000023034
UniProt	P22736	P12813
RefSeq (mRNA)	NM_001202233; NM_001202234; NM_002135; NM_173157; NM_173158	NM_010444
RefSeq (protein)	NP_001189162; NP_001189163; NP_002126; NP_775180; NP_002126.2 NP_775180.1	NP_034574
Location (UCSC)	Chr 12: 52.02 – 52.06 Mb	Chr 15: 101.15 – 101.17 Mb
PubMed search
- Wikidata
View/Edit Human	View/Edit Mouse

The nuclear receptor 4A1 (NR4A1 for "nuclear receptor subfamily 4 group A member 1") also known as Nur77, TR3, and NGFI-B is a protein that in humans is encoded by the NR4A1 gene.

Nuclear receptor 4A1 (NR4A1) is a member of the NR4A nuclear receptor family of intracellular transcription factors. NR4A1 is involved in cell cycle mediation, inflammation and apoptosis.

Nuclear receptor 4A1 plays a key role in mediating inflammatory responses in macrophages. In addition, subcellular localization of the NR4A1 protein appears to play a key role in the survival and death of cells.

Expression is inducible by phytohemagglutinin in human lymphocytes and by serum stimulation of arrested fibroblasts. Translocation of the protein from the nucleus to mitochondria induces apoptosis. Multiple alternatively spliced variants, encoding the same protein, have been identified.

== Structure ==
The NR4A1 gene contains seven exons. An amino terminal transactivation domain is encoded in exon 2, a DNA-binding domain in exons 3 and 4, and dimerisation and a ligand-binding domain is exons 5 to 7.

The protein has an atypical ligand-binding domain that is unlike the classical ligand-binding domain in most nuclear receptors. The classical domain contains a ligand-receiving pocket and co-activator site, both of which are lacking in the NR4A family. Whereas most nuclear receptors have a hydrophobic surface that results in a cleft, NR4A1 has a hydrophilic surface.

Cofactors interact with Nuclear receptor 4A1 at a hydrophobic region between helices 11 and 12 to modulate transcription.

== Function ==
Along with the two other NR4A family members, NR4A1 is expressed in macrophages following inflammatory stimuli. This process is mediated by the NF-κB (nuclear factor-kappa B) complex, a ubiquitous transcription factor involved in cellular response to stress.

Nuclear receptor 4A1 can be induced by many physiological and physical stimuli. These include physiological stimuli such as "fatty acids, stress, prostaglandins, growth factors, calcium, inflammatory cytokines, peptide hormones, phorbol esters, and neurotransmitters" and physical stimuli including "magnetic fields, mechanical agitation (causing fluid shear stress), and membrane depolarization". No endogenous ligands that bind to NR4A1 have yet been identified, so modulation occurs at the level of protein expression and posttranslational modification. Besides these, NR4A1 can mediate T cell function, the transcription factor NR4A1 is stably expressed at high levels in tolerant T cells. Overexpression of Nuclear receptor 4A1 inhibits effector T cell differentiation, whereas deletion of NR4A1 overcomes T cell tolerance and exaggerates effector function, as well as enhancing immunity against tumor and chronic virus. Mechanistically, NR4A1 is preferentially recruited to binding sites of the transcription factor AP-1, where it represses effector gene expression by inhibiting AP-1 function. NR4A1 binding also promotes acetylation of histone 3 at lysine 27 (H3K27ac), leading to activation of tolerance-related genes.

There are several ligands that directly bind NR4A1, including cytosporone B, dexamethasone, celastrol, and certain polyunsaturated fatty acids. These NR4A1 ligands bind at various NR4A1 sites and show activities that are dependent on ligand structure and cell context. These NR4A1 ligands may have relevance to treatment of cancer, metabolic disease, inflammation, and endometriosis. NR4A1 may play a role in Drug-induced gingival overgrowth associated with exposure to phenytoin, nifedipine, and cyclosporine A.

=== Interaction with INSL3 ===
NR4A1 is a transcription factor important in the development of cells that secrete the hormone insulin-like 3 (INSL3).

In humans, INSL3 aids in the regulation of testicular descent during fetal development. In an adult INSL3 helps in keeping germ cells alive, in both males and females.

In the male reproductive system the NR4A1 gene is a promoter of insulin-like 3 in Leydig cells. Leydig cells are located in the testis and known for the function as a support cell in spermatogenesis. Along with other things they secrete testosterone.

In females, INSL3 is also involved in the reproductive system. It is secreted by thecal and luteal cells in the ovary and thus is important in the maturation of developing oocytes. In the rabbit model, disorders observed involving NR4A1 expression include testicular dysgenesis, and cryptorchidism.

Immunoprecipitation assays show that INSL3 does bind to NR4A1; however, much is still not known about INSL3 regulation and the direct involvement of the NR4A1 gene.

== Biochemistry ==
Nuclear receptor 4A1 binds as a monomer or homodimer to response element NBRE and as a homodimer to NurRE. It is also capable of heterodimerising with COUP-TF (an orphan nuclear receptor) and retinoid X receptor (RXR) in mediating transcription in response to retinoids. Moreover, Nur77 heterodimerizes with glucocorticoid receptor, a process that regulates Nur77's binding to DNA.

The binding sites on the response elements for NR4A1, which are common to the two other members of the NR4A family, are:

- NBRE - 5’-A/TAAAGGTCA,
- NurRE - a AAAT(G/A)(C/T)CA repeat,
- RXR - DX, a motif.

== Evolution and homology ==
Nuclear receptor 4A1 has the systematic HUGO gene symbol NR4A1. It belongs to a group of three closely related orphan receptors, the NR4A family (NR4A). The other two members are Nuclear receptor 4A2 (NR4A2) and Nuclear receptor 4A3 (NR4A3).

Nuclear receptor 4A1 has a high degree of structural similarity with other family members at the DNA-binding domain with 91-95% sequence conservation. The C-terminal ligand-binding domain is conserved to a lesser extent at 60% and the N-terminal AB region is not conserved, differing in each member.

The three members are similar in biochemistry and function. They are immediate early genes activated in a ligand-independent manner that bind at the homologous sites on response elements.

Nuclear receptor 4A1 and the rest of the NR4A family are structurally similar to other nuclear receptor superfamily members, but contain an extra intron. The DNA-binding domain at exons 3 and 4 of the NR4A1 gene is conserved among all members of the nuclear receptor.

NR4A1 has homologous genes in a range of species including neuronal growth factor-induced clone B in rats, Nur77 in mice and TR3 in humans.

== Pathology ==
Along with 16 other genes, NR4A1 is a signature gene in the metastasis of some primary solid tumours. It is downregulated in this process.

== Interactions ==
Nuclear receptor 4A1 has been shown to interact with:

- AKT1,
- Bcl-2,
- HIF1A,
- Nuclear receptor co-repressor 2,
- Promyelocytic leukemia protein,
- Retinoid X receptor alpha, and
- Von Hippel–Lindau tumor suppressor.
