= Anjana Rao =

Indian-American molecular biologist

Anjana Rao is a cellular and molecular biologist of Indian ethnicity, working in the US. She uses immune cells as well as other types of cells to understand intracellular signaling and gene expression. Her research focuses on how signaling pathways control gene expression.

== Education and career ==
Rao earned her master’s degree in physics from Osmania University in India, her Ph.D. in Biophysics from Harvard University, and completed a postdoctoral fellowship at the Dana-Farber Cancer Institute. She was a Professor of Pathology at Harvard Medical School until 2010, when she moved to be professor at the La Jolla Institute for Immunology and adjunct professor in Pharmacology at the University of California San Diego. With her collaborator Patrick Hogan (also professor at the La Jolla Institute for Immunology), she is a cofounder of the company Calcimedica. She spent eight years on the Jane Coffin Childs Board of Scientific Advisors, a Foundation that supports cancer research, specifically research focusing on controlling the growth and development of cancer cells. She is also a member of the Scientific Advisory Board of the Cancer Research Institute, a non-profit organization that supports scientific research on cancer immunotherapy, one of the most promising cancer treatments currently available.

== Awards ==
Rao has been elected to the US National Academy of Sciences, the American Academy of Arts and Sciences, and the American Association for the Advancement of Science. She is a member of the American Association of Immunologists and the American Society for Biochemistry and Molecular Biology.

== Research ==
Rao’s early research at Harvard was focused on NFAT (Nuclear Factor of Activated T-cells) transcription factors, which she discovered with postdoctoral fellows Jugnu Jain and Pat McCaffrey and collaborator Patrick Hogan. They showed that NFAT proteins were expressed by most immune cells, and were essential for transcription of genes important for an immune response. They also showed that NFAT was regulated by calcium and the calcium-dependent phosphatase calcineurin, which removes phosphate groups from NFAT to allow it to enter into the nucleus of the cell, and that it partnered with the unrelated transcription factors Fos and Jun to turn on T cell activation.

Also while at Harvard, Rao, Hogan, and postdoctoral fellows Yousang Gwack and Stefan Feske, with colleagues Richard Lewis and Murali Prakriya at Stanford, discovered the molecular identity of Calcium Release-Activated Calcium (CRAC) channels which are necessary for calcium to enter most cells in the body. They discovered that an inherited immunodeficiency was caused by a mutation in the gene encoding the CRAC channel ORAI1. The immunodeficiency was due to the role calcium activation plays in the translocation of NFAT proteins to the nucleus, which then turn on immune response genes including cytokine genes such as Interleukin-2. In the immunodeficient patients, the mutation in ORAI1 caused a complete loss of calcium entry and left the children susceptible to different kinds of infections.

Just before moving from Harvard to the west coast, Rao discovered the TET (Ten-Eleven Translocation) proteins with graduate student Mamta Tahiliani and collaborator Dr. L. Aravind. They showed that all three TET proteins are enzymes that alter gene expression by oxidizing the methyl group of the “fifth base”, 5-hydroxymethylcytosine, and causing DNA demethylation, replacement of 5-methylcytosine by cytosine. At the La Jolla Institute, her lab demonstrated the importance of TET enzymes in proper gene expression, both in various cells of the immune system and during embryonic development. They also highlighted the role of TET proteins in suppressing cancer development, particularly in lymphoid, myeloid and other hematological malignancies, and outlined the potential for TET activators such as Vitamin C as targeted epigenetic therapy for these hematological malignancies.

As a continuation of their longstanding interest in NFAT and calcium signalling, Rao and Hogan have also performed research on T cell exhaustion. With colleagues, they worked to define the term T cell exhaustion, which was vaguely used to mean decreased immune responses due to overstimulation of T-cells by antigens. Their research specifically focuses on T cells found within tumors. They and their colleagues have shown that like normal T cells, T cells with Chimeric Antigen Receptors (CAR) become exhausted when residing in a tumor. They concluded that TOX and NR4A transcription factors play an important role in the exhaustion of T cells, and that inhibition or disruption of these transcription factors is a promising approach for cancer immunotherapy.
