= C12H9F3N2O2 =

The molecular formula C_{12}H_{9}F_{3}N_{2}O_{2} (molar mass: 270.21 g/mol, exact mass: 270.0616 u) may refer to:

- Teriflunomide
- Leflunomide
