= NR4 =

NR4 may refer to:

- NASCAR Racing 4
- Nur (biology)
