= Vidofludimus =

Chemical compound

Vidofludimus INN: Vidofludimus calcium

Clinical data
- Routes of administration: oral (tablet)
- Drug class: small-molecule

Legal status
- Legal status: Investigational

Identifiers
- IUPAC name: 2-[[2-fluoro-4-(3-methoxyphenyl)phenyl]carbamoyl]cyclopentene-1-carboxylic acid
- CAS Number: 717824-30-1
- PubChem CID: 9820008
- DrugBank: DB15446
- ChemSpider: 7995757
- UNII: 8Y1PJ3VG81
- KEGG: D13127
- ChEMBL: ChEMBL197194
- CompTox Dashboard (EPA): DTXSID50431325
- ECHA InfoCard: 100.112.872

Chemical and physical data
- Formula: C_{20}H_{18}FNO_{4}
- Molar mass: 355.365 g·mol^{−1}
- 3D model (JSmol): Interactive image
- SMILES: COC1=CC=CC(=C1)C2=CC(=C(C=C2)NC(=O)C3=C(CCC3)C(=O)O)F
- InChI: InChI=1S/C20H18FNO4/c1-26-14-5-2-4-12(10-14)13-8-9-18(17(21)11-13)22-19(23)15-6-3-7-16(15)20(24)25/h2,4-5,8-11H,3,6-7H2,1H3,(H,22,23)(H,24,25); Key:XPRDUGXOWVXZLL-UHFFFAOYSA-N

Vidofludimus is an orally administered small-molecule compound and an investigational new drug. Its calcium salt is being evaluated to treat multiple sclerosis (MS), ulcerative colitis and other chronic inflammatory and autoimmune diseases. It is a nuclear receptor-related 1 (Nurr1) activator and dihydroorotate dehydrogenase (DHODH) inhibitor. Vidofludimus is being developed by the American-German biotechnology company Immunic Therapeutics.

== Potential medical applications ==
As of 2025, vidofludimus calcium is not approved in any country and is being tested in clinical trials for the treatment of MS, including the Phase 3 ENSURE studies in relapsing multiple sclerosis (RMS), as well as for the treatment of post‑COVID syndrome (PCS).

In addition, the investigational drug was tested in Phase 2 studies in relapsing‑remitting MS (RRMS), progressive MS (PMS), moderate to severe ulcerative colitis (UC), primary sclerosing cholangitis (PSC) and COVID-19, as well as in Phase 1 studies in healthy volunteers.

As studies have shown, the safety profile observed is similar to that of placebo. The pharmacokinetic profile, with a terminal plasma half-life of approximately 30 hours, enables once-daily oral administration.

== Mechanism of action ==
Vidofludimus calcium acts as an activator of nuclear receptor-related 1 (Nurr1), a neuroprotective transcription factor and emerging target for neurodegenerative diseases. Activation of Nurr1 is associated with neuroprotective effects by acting on microglia, astrocytes, and neurons. In microglia and astrocytes, Nurr1 activation leads to a reduction in pro-inflammatory cytokines and blocks the production of direct neurotoxic agents such as reactive oxygen species and nitric oxide. Increased Nurr1 activity in neurons promotes neuronal survival and differentiation, as well as improved neurotransmission. Therefore, activation of Nurr1 by vidofludimus calcium could reduce or halt neurodegeneration and the progression of disability in patients suffering from MS and other degenerative diseases.

In addition to its effects as a Nurr1 activator, vidofludimus calcium is also an inhibitor of dihydroorotate dehydrogenase (DHODH), a mitochondrial key enzyme required for pyrimidine de novo biosynthesis. In contrast to resting lymphocytes, active and rapidly proliferating lymphocytes rely on this enzyme to meet their demand for pyrimidines. To counteract an activated and pathogenic lymphocyte population, DHODH blockade is of clinical interest: the activated lymphocytes undergo metabolic stress, which subsequently induces apoptosis of the activated immune cells.

== Pharmaceutical formulation ==
Vidofludimus calcium is formulated as an oral tablet. Current dose strengths used in clinical studies are 30 mg and 45 mg.
