= Patrick Hogan (biologist) =

Cellular & Molecular Biologist

Patrick G. Hogan is a cellular and molecular biologist who studies how cellular signaling leads to gene expression. He obtained his bachelor’s degree from Harvard University and a PhD in neurobiology from Harvard Medical School. In 2010, he moved to the La Jolla Institute for Immunology in San Diego as a Professor in the Division of Signaling and Gene Expression. He is a Founder and Member of the Scientific Advisory Board, CalciMedica Inc, La Jolla, CA.

== Research ==
Hogan's research interests have been focused on the signaling and gene expression pathways that result from calcium entry into cells. He molecularly cloned the transcription factor NFAT, which is dephosphorylated by the calcium-regulated phosphatase calcineurin, and solved its structure in collaboration with the laboratory of Stephen Harrison at Harvard Medical School. He investigated the protein-protein interactions between calcineurin and NFAT. Subsequently, he identified ORAI1 as the pore subunit of the store-operated Ca^{2+} channel in human cells, and investigated the regulation of ORAI1 by STIM1, a single-pass transmembrane protein located in the membrane of the endoplasmic reticulum (ER) that senses the concentration of calcium in the ER stores and then opens the ORAI1 calcium channel in the plasma membrane. He has made major contributions to our understanding of the mechanisms and regulation of cellular calcium signaling, particularly modulation of the STIM-ORAI pathway in the context of ER-plasma membrane junctions, which he has investigated using whole-genome screens, super-resolution microscopy and single-molecule tracking.

T cells that enter a tumor initially attempt to destroy the cancer cells but then enter a state in which they are poorly responsive and fail to attack the tumor cells effectively. This state also occurs during chronic viral infections and has been termed “T cell exhaustion.” Hogan's research showed that T cell exhaustion is driven by the transcription factor NFAT in the absence of its transcriptional partners Fos and Jun. With Fos and Jun, NFAT promotes effective T cell activation and tumor killing, but in their absence, NFAT induces the secondary transcription factors NR4A and TOX, which then cooperate with NFAT to induce the exhausted or hyporesponsive state. He also showed that BATF transcription factors play an important role in preventing the exhaustion of T cells with Chimeric Antigen Receptors (CAR), and that disruption of the NFAT:AP-1 interaction can be achieved with small molecules and may be a promising therapeutic approach.
