= Dihydroorotate dehydrogenase =

Class of enzymes

DHODH

Identifiers
- Aliases: DHODH, DHOdehase, POADS, URA1, dihydroorotate dehydrogenase (quinone)
- External IDs: OMIM: 126064; MGI: 1928378; GeneCards: DHODH
Available structures
| PDB | Ortholog search: PDBe RCSB |
| PDB | List of PDB id codes 1D3G, 1D3H, 2B0M, 2BXV, 2FPT, 2FPV, 2FPY, 2FQI, 2PRH, 2PRL, 2PRM, 2WV8, 3F1Q, 3FJ6, 3FJL, 3G0U, 3G0X, 3KVJ, 3KVK, 3KVL, 3KVM, 3U2O, 3W7R, 3ZWS, 3ZWT, 4IGH, 4JGD, 4JS3, 4JTS, 4JTT, 4JTU, 4LS0, 4LS1, 4LS2, 4OQV, 4RK8, 4RKA, 4RLI, 4RR4, 4YLW, 4ZL1, 5HQE, 4ZMG |
Enzyme activity
| EC # | BRENDA | ExPASy | KEGG | MetaCyc |
|---|---|---|---|---|
| 1.3.5.2 | ↗ | ↗ | ↗ | ↗ |

Gene location (Human)
| Chr. | Chromosome 16 (human) |
| Band | 16q22.2 | Start | 72,008,588 bp |
| Band | 16q22.2 | End | 72,027,664 bp |

Gene location (Mouse)
| Chr. | Chromosome 8 (mouse) |
| Band | 8|8 D3 | Start | 110,317,975 bp |
| Band | 8|8 D3 | End | 110,335,305 bp |
RNA expression pattern
| Bgee | Human / Mouse (ortholog); Top expressed in: right lobe of liver; right auricle of heart; apex of heart; tibial nerve; muscle of leg; right ovary; gastrocnemius muscle; left ovary; sural nerve; muscle of thigh / Top expressed in: blastocyst; yolk sac; otic vesicle; embryo; epiblast; embryo; otic placode; zygote; primitive streak; secondary oocyte; More reference expression data |
| BioGPS | n/a |
Gene ontology
| Molecular function | oxidoreductase activity, acting on the CH-CH group of donors; FMN binding; ubiquinone binding; catalytic activity; oxidoreductase activity; dihydroorotate dehydrogenase activity |
| Cellular component | integral component of membrane; membrane; nucleoplasm; soma; mitochondrion; mitochondrial inner membrane; cytoplasm; cytosol; plasma membrane |
| Biological process | response to organic cyclic compound; female pregnancy; pyrimidine nucleoside biosynthetic process; regulation of mitochondrial fission; pyrimidine nucleotide biosynthetic process; positive regulation of apoptotic process; response to starvation; response to caffeine; lactation; 'de novo' UMP biosynthetic process; response to L-arginine; 'de novo' pyrimidine nucleobase biosynthetic process; pyrimidine ribonucleotide biosynthetic process |
Sources:Amigo / QuickGO
Orthologs
| Databases | NCBI: entry; OMA: entry |
| Species | Human | Mouse |
| Entrez | 1723 | 56749 |
| Ensembl | ENSG00000102967 | ENSMUSG00000031730 |
| UniProt | Q02127 | O35435 |
| RefSeq (mRNA) | NM_001025193; NM_001361 | NM_020046 |
| RefSeq (protein) | NP_001352 | NP_064430 |
| Location (UCSC) | Chr 16: 72.01 – 72.03 Mb | Chr 8: 110.32 – 110.34 Mb |
| PubMed search |
- Wikidata
| View/Edit Human | View/Edit Mouse |

Dihydroorotate oxidase
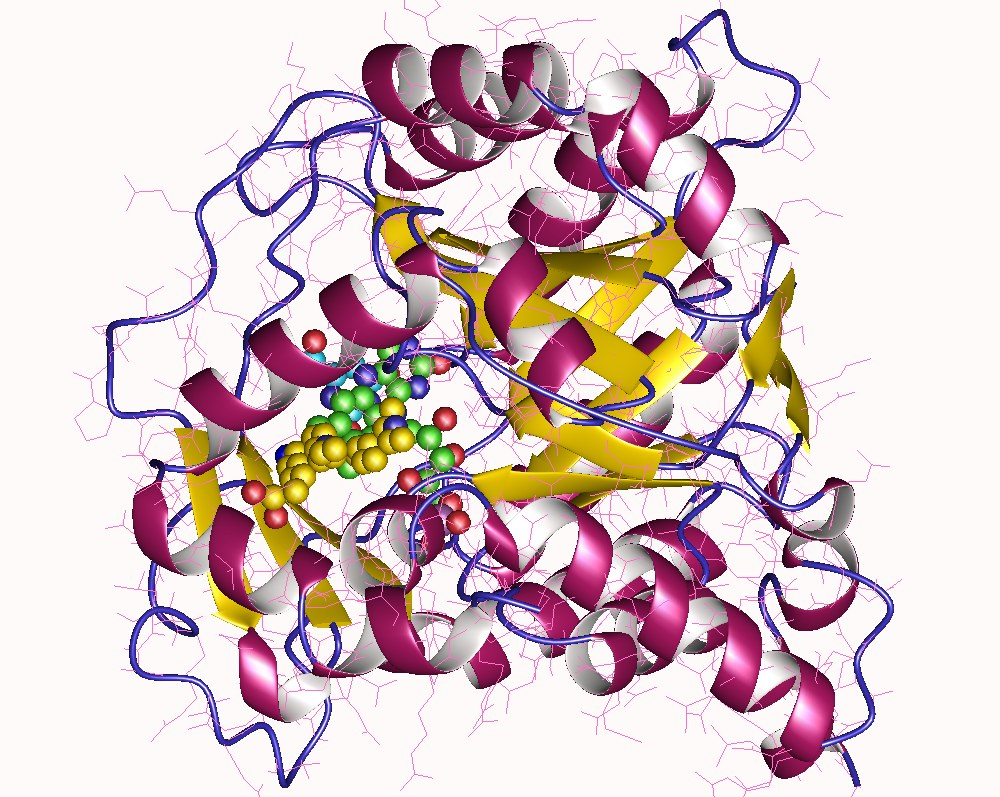
- Dihydroorotate dehydrogenase monomer + inhibitor, Human

Identifiers
- EC no.: 1.3.5.2
- CAS no.: 9029-03-2

Databases
- BRENDA: enzyme data
- ExPASy: NiceZyme view
- KEGG: enzyme entry
- MetaCyc: metabolic pathway
- Rhea: reactions
- PDB structures: RCSB PDB PDBe PDBsum
- Gene Ontology: AmiGO / QuickGO
Search
- PMC: articles
- PubMed: articles
- NCBI: proteins

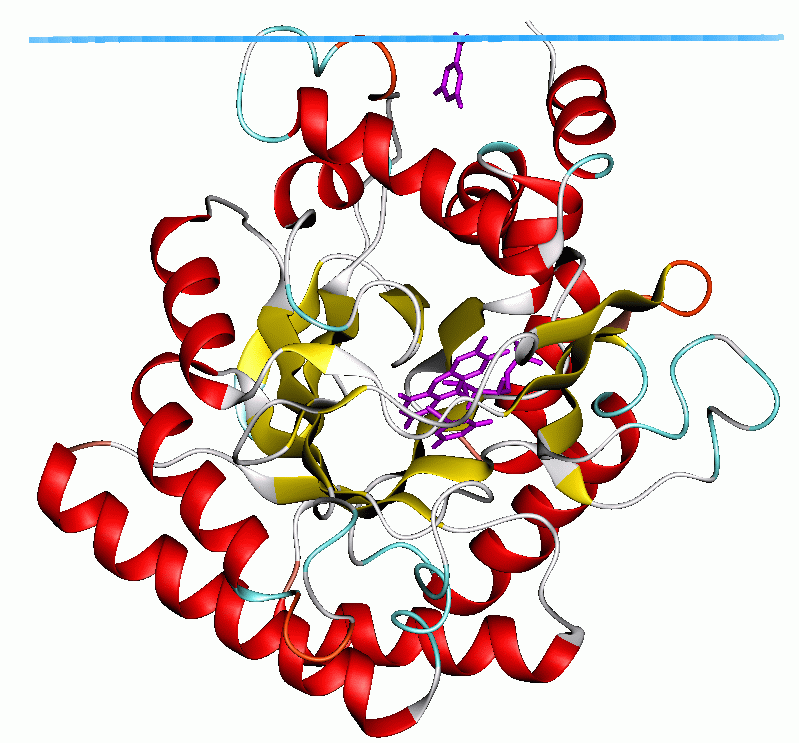
- Dihydroorotate dehydrogenase from E. coli

Identifiers
- Symbol: DHO_dh
- Pfam: PF01180
- InterPro: IPR001295
- PROSITE: PDOC00708
- SCOP2: 1dor / SCOPe / SUPFAM
- OPM superfamily: 56
- OPM protein: 1uum
- CDD: cd02810
- Membranome: 250
Available protein structures:
- PDB: IPR001295 PF01180 (ECOD; PDBsum)
- AlphaFold: IPR001295; PF01180

Dihydroorotate dehydrogenase (DHODH) is an enzyme that in humans is encoded by the DHODH gene on chromosome 16. The protein encoded by this gene catalyzes the fourth enzymatic step, the ubiquinone-mediated oxidation of dihydroorotate to orotate, in de novo pyrimidine biosynthesis. This protein is a mitochondrial protein located on the outer surface of the inner mitochondrial membrane (IMM). Inhibitors of this enzyme are used to treat autoimmune diseases such as rheumatoid arthritis.

== Structure ==
DHODH can vary in cofactor content, oligomeric state, subcellular localization, and membrane association. An overall sequence alignment of these DHODH variants presents two classes of DHODHs: the cytosolic Class 1 and the membrane-bound Class 2. In Class 1 DHODH, a basic cysteine residue catalyzes the oxidation reaction, whereas in Class 2, the serine serves this catalytic function. Structurally, Class 1 DHODHs can also be divided into two subclasses, one of which forms homodimers and uses fumarate as its electron acceptor, and the other which forms heterotetramers and uses NAD+ as its electron acceptor. This second subclass contains an addition subunit (PyrK) containing an iron-sulfur cluster and a flavin adenine dinucleotide (FAD). Meanwhile, Class 2 DHODHs use coenzyme Q/ubiquinones for their oxidant.

In higher eukaryotes, this class of DHODH contains an N-terminal bipartite signal comprising a cationic, amphipathic mitochondrial targeting sequence of about 30 residues and a hydrophobic transmembrane sequence. The targeting sequence is responsible for this protein's localization to the IMM, possibly from recruiting the import apparatus and mediating ΔΨ-driven transport across the inner and outer mitochondrial membranes, while the transmembrane sequence is essential for its insertion into the IMM. This sequence is adjacent to a pair of α-helices, α1 and α2, which are connected by a short loop. Together, this pair forms a hydrophobic funnel that is suggested to serve as the insertion site for ubiquinone, in conjunction with the FMN binding cavity at the C-terminal. The two terminal domains are directly connected by an extended loop. The C-terminal domain is the larger of the two and folds into a conserved α/β-barrel structure with a core of eight parallel β-strands surrounded by eight α helices.

== Function ==
Human DHODH is a ubiquitous FMN flavoprotein. In bacteria (gene pyrD), it is located on the inner side of the cytosolic membrane. In some yeasts, such as in Saccharomyces cerevisiae (gene URA1), it is a cytosolic protein, whereas, in other eukaryotes, it is found in the mitochondria. It is also the only enzyme in the pyrimidine biosynthesis pathway located in the mitochondria rather than the cytosol.

As an enzyme associated with the electron transport chain, DHODH links mitochondrial bioenergetics, cell proliferation, ROS production, and apoptosis in certain cell types. DHODH depletion also resulted in increased ROS production, decreased membrane potential and cell growth retardation. Also, due to its role in DNA synthesis, inhibition of DHODH may provide a means to regulate transcriptional elongation.

=== Mechanism ===
In mammalian species, DHODH catalyzes the fourth step in de novo pyrimidine biosynthesis, which involves the ubiquinone-mediated oxidation of dihydroorotate to orotate and the reduction of FMN to dihydroflavin mononucleotide (FMNH2):

(S)-dihydroorotate + O_{2} $\rightleftharpoons$ orotate + H_{2}O_{2}

4,5-Dihydroorotic acid

Orotic acid. Note the double bond in the ring.

The particular mechanism for the dehydrogenation of dihydroorotic acid by DHODH differs between the two classes of DHODH. Class 1 DHODHs follow a concerted mechanism, in which the two C–H bonds of dihydroorotic acid break in concert. Class 2 DHODHs follow a stepwise mechanism, in which the breaking of the C–H bonds precedes the equilibration of iminium into orotic acid.

== Inhibitors ==
- Brequinar
- Izumerogant
- Leflunomide
- Olorofim
- Orludodstat
- S416
- Teriflunomide
- Vidofludimus Calcium
- Tetflupyrolimet

== Clinical significance ==
Brequinar, a potent and selective inhibitor of the enzyme dihydroorotate dehydrogenase, has been shown to inhibit completely vaccinia virus in human cells. The immunomodulatory drugs teriflunomide and leflunomide have been shown to inhibit DHODH. Human DHODH has two domains: an alpha/beta-barrel domain containing the active site and an alpha-helical domain that forms the opening of a tunnel leading to the active site. Leflunomide has been shown to bind in this tunnel. Leflunomide is being used for treatment of rheumatoid and psoriatic arthritis, as well as multiple sclerosis. Its immunosuppressive effects have been attributed to the depletion of the pyrimidine supply for T cells or to more complex interferon or interleukin-mediated pathways, but nonetheless require further research.

Additionally, DHODH may play a role in retinoid N-(4-hydroxyphenyl)retinamide (4HPR)-mediated cancer suppression. Inhibition of DHODH activity with teriflunomide or expression with RNA interference resulted in reduced ROS generation in, and thus apoptosis of, transformed skin and prostate epithelial cells.

Mutations in this gene have been shown to cause Miller syndrome, also known as Genee-Wiedemann syndrome, Wildervanck-Smith syndrome or post-axial acrofacial dystosis.

In Plasmodium falciparum, DHODH is essential for pyrimidine production as there is no salvage pathway. The parasite requires electron transport chain activity with intact mitochondrial membrane potential for DHODH activity.

== Herbicide usage ==
The DHODH inhibitor Tetflupyrolimet (marketed as Dodhylex™ active) is a herbicide and marketed currently primarily for control of annual grass weeds in rice "Syngenta and FMC commercialize breakthrough technology that transforms grass control in rice". Syngenta.. Current approvals and commercialization for this technology focus on the Asian rice market, with global registration underway.

The active represents a new herbicide mode of action (DHODH inhibition) that is the first broadly marketed MoA of its kind in roughly 30 years, offering an alternative for managing herbicide‑resistant grass weeds."FMC Corporation announces Dodhylex active as global trademark for novel grass herbicide". FMC.. It is the only herbicide in the Herbicide Resistance Action Committee's (HRAC classification) Group 28.

Safety and selectivity Selectivity between crop and non‑target organisms is achieved through a combination of factors including differences in plant versus animal DHODH binding sites, crop tolerance and safener strategies, formulation and application practices that limit non‑target exposure, and metabolism/clearance in non‑target species. "Syngenta and FMC commercialize breakthrough technology that transforms grass control in rice". Syngenta.

== Interactions ==
DHODH binds to its FMN cofactor in conjunction with ubiquinone to catalyze the oxidation of dihydroorotate to orotate.
