= Izumerogant =

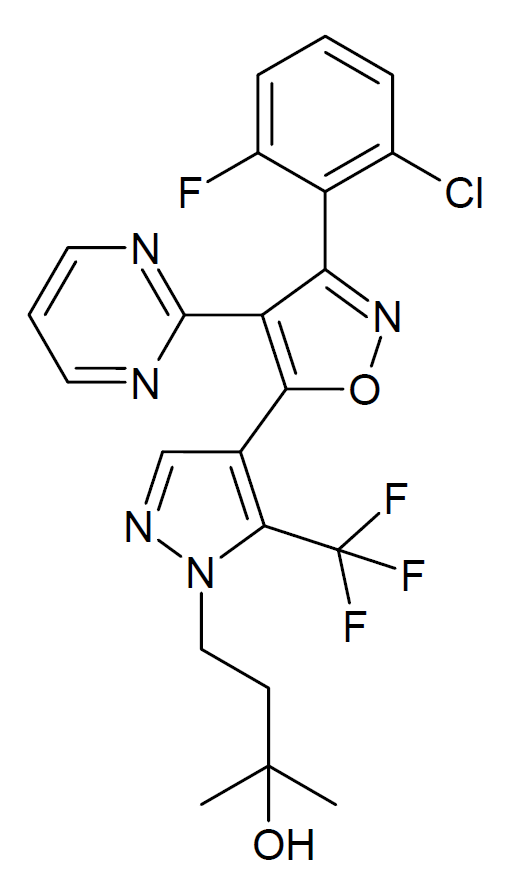

Clinical data
- Other names: IMU-935
- Drug class: RORγ agonist/DHODH inhibitor

Identifiers
- IUPAC name: 4-[4-[3-(2-chloro-6-fluorophenyl)-4-pyrimidin-2-yl-1,2-oxazol-5-yl]-5-(trifluoromethyl)pyrazol-1-yl]-2-methylbutan-2-ol
- CAS Number: 2299252-72-3
- PubChem CID: 154695807
- UNII: 3YCU39T8ZJ

Chemical and physical data
- Formula: C_{22}H_{18}ClF_{4}N_{5}O_{2}
- Molar mass: 495.86 g·mol^{−1}
- 3D model (JSmol): Interactive image
- SMILES: CC(C)(CCN1C(=C(C=N1)C2=C(C(=NO2)C3=C(C=CC=C3Cl)F)C4=NC=CC=N4)C(F)(F)F)O
- InChI: InChI=1S/C22H18ClF4N5O2/c1-21(2,33)7-10-32-19(22(25,26)27)12(11-30-32)18-16(20-28-8-4-9-29-20)17(31-34-18)15-13(23)5-3-6-14(15)24/h3-6,8-9,11,33H,7,10H2,1-2H3; Key:MRJLIFZIFUEXQG-UHFFFAOYSA-N

Izumerogant (IMU-935) is a drug which acts as both a selective antagonist of the receptor RAR-related orphan receptor gamma (RORγ), and also an inhibitor of the enzyme dihydroorotate dehydrogenase (DHODH). It has antiinflammatory and broad-spectrum antiviral effects, and is also of interest in the treatment of cancer.
