= PyrD leader =

PyrD leader and pyrimidine biosynthesis

In molecular biology, the PyrD leader is a cis-regulatory RNA element found at the 5' of the PyrC mRNA in Pseudomonadota. The PyrD gene encodes dihydroorotate dehydrogenase, an enzyme involved in pyrimidine biosynthesis. The PyrD leader regulates expression of PyrD. Translation initiation can occur at more than one different site within this leader sequence, under high cytidine triphosphate or guanosine triphosphate conditions the translation initiation site is upstream of that used under low CTP/GTP conditions, additional cytosine residues are incorporated into the mRNA resulting in the formation of an RNA hairpin. This hairpin blocks ribosome-binding at the Shine-Dalgarno sequence, and therefore blocks expression of PyrD. Under low CTP/GTP conditions the initiation site is further downstream and does not result in hairpin formation, so the ribosome can bind to the Shine-Dalgarno sequence and PyrD is expressed.
