= Brequinar =

Chemical compound

Clinical data
- Trade names: Brequinar

Identifiers
- IUPAC name: 6-fluoro-2-(2'-fluoro-1,1'-biphenyl-4-yl)-3-methyl-4-quinolinecarboxylic acid
- CAS Number: 96187-53-0
- PubChem CID: 57030
- DrugBank: DB03523
- ChemSpider: 51422
- UNII: 5XL19F49H6
- KEGG: D03154
- ChEBI: CHEBI:177387
- ChEMBL: ChEMBL38434
- CompTox Dashboard (EPA): DTXSID00242165

Chemical and physical data
- Formula: C_{23}H_{15}F_{2}NO_{2}
- Molar mass: 375.375 g·mol^{−1}
- 3D model (JSmol): Interactive image
- SMILES: CC1=C(C2=C(C=CC(=C2)F)N=C1C3=CC=C(C=C3)C4=CC=CC=C4F)C(=O)O
- InChI: InChI=1S/C23H15F2NO2/c1-13-21(23(27)28)18-12-16(24)10-11-20(18)26-22(13)15-8-6-14(7-9-15)17-4-2-3-5-19(17)25/h2-12H,1H3,(H,27,28); Key:PHEZJEYUWHETKO-UHFFFAOYSA-N

Brequinar (DuP-785) is a drug that acts as a potent and selective inhibitor of the enzyme dihydroorotate dehydrogenase. It blocks synthesis of pyrimidine based nucleotides in the body and so inhibits cell growth. Brequinar was invented by DuPont Pharmaceuticals in the 1980s. In 2001, Bristol-Myers Squibb acquired DuPont, and in 2017, Clear Creek Bio acquired the rights to brequinar from BMS.

Brequinar has been investigated as an immunosuppressant for preventing rejection after organ transplant and also as an anti-cancer drug, but was not accepted for medical use in either application largely due to its narrow therapeutic dose range and severe side effects when dosed inappropriately. It has been researched both as part of a potential combination therapy for some cancers, or alternatively as an antiparasitic, or antiviral drug. Clear Creek Bio is currently developing brequinar as a potential treatment for COVID-19.

Inhibition of dihydroorotate dehydrogenase activity by brequinar may represent an efficient approach to the elimination of undifferentiated cells for safe PSC-derived differentiated cells based therapies. Brequinar has been shown to inhibit completely vaccinia virus in cell based assay.

== See also ==
- Leflunomide - Clinically used DHODH inhibitor
- Methotrexate - the most widely used pyrimidine synthesis inhibitor
