= Nuclear receptor 4A3 =

Protein-coding gene in the species Homo sapiens

NR4A3
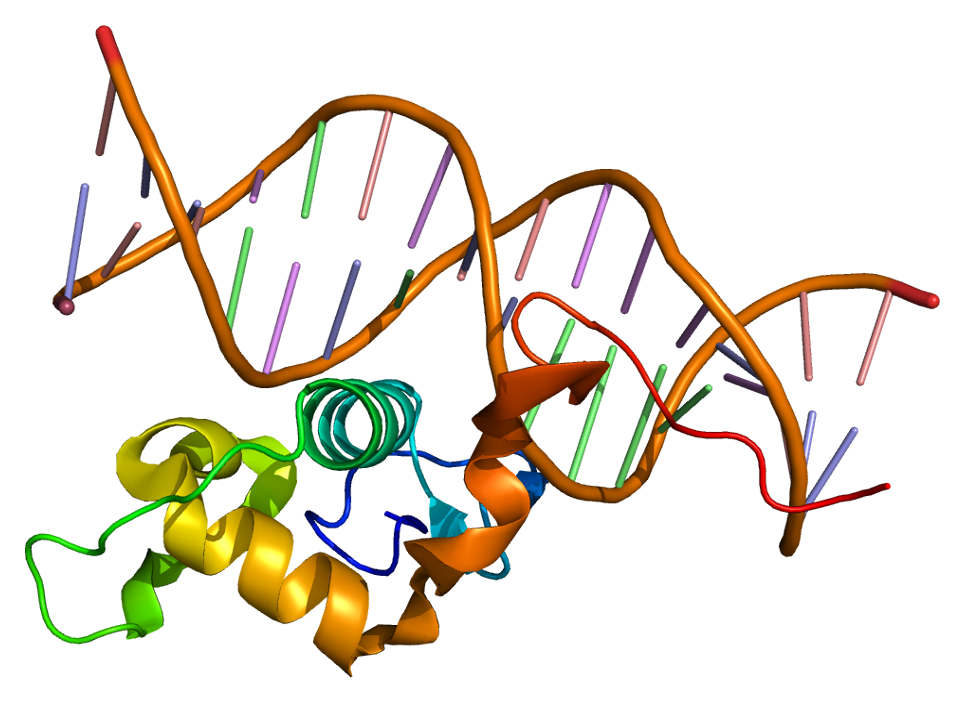

Identifiers
- Aliases: NR4A3, CHN, CSMF, MINOR, NOR1, TEC, nuclear receptor subfamily 4 group A member 3
- External IDs: OMIM: 600542; MGI: 1352457; GeneCards: NR4A3

Gene location (Human)
Chr.	Chromosome 9 (human)
Band	9q31.1	Start	99,821,855 bp
Band	9q31.1	End	99,866,891 bp

Gene location (Mouse)
Chr.	Chromosome 4 (mouse)
Band	4|4 B1	Start	48,045,153 bp
Band	4|4 B1	End	48,086,447 bp
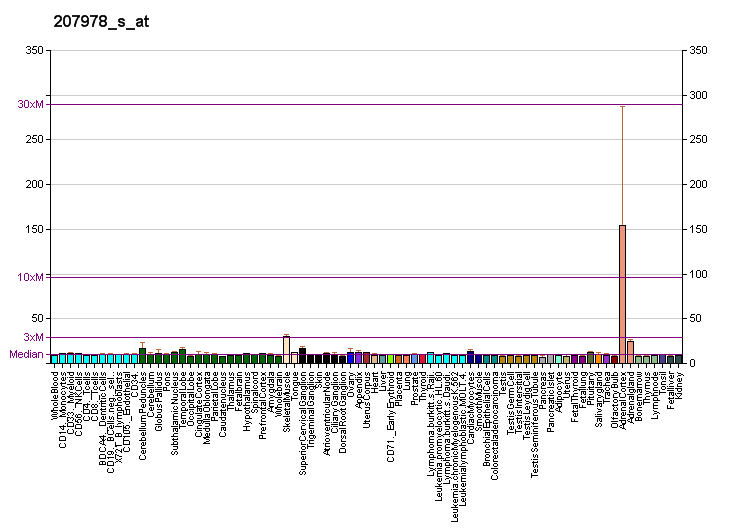

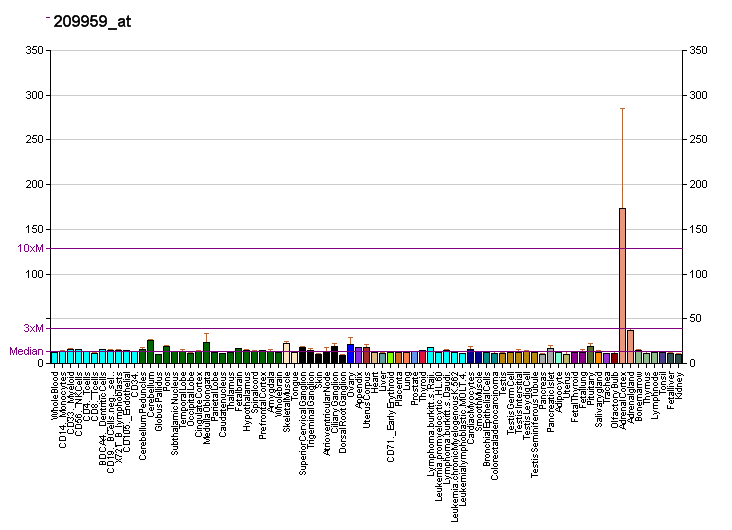

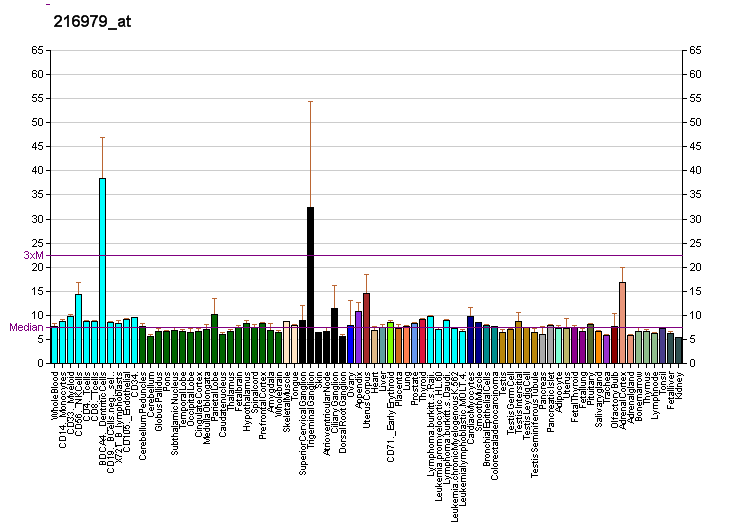
RNA expression pattern
Bgee	Human / Mouse (ortholog); Top expressed in: mucosa of paranasal sinus; mucosa of urinary bladder; tail of epididymis; gastric mucosa; vena cava; muscle of thigh; gallbladder; right ventricle; popliteal artery; tibial arteries / Top expressed in: Region I of hippocampus proper; seminal vesicula; medulla of thymus; hippocampus proper; adrenal gland; dentate gyrus; dentate gyrus of hippocampal formation granule cell; amygdala; subiculum; extraocular muscle; More reference expression data
BioGPS	More reference expression data
Gene ontology
Molecular function	DNA binding; sequence-specific DNA binding; protein homodimerization activity; DNA-binding transcription factor activity; zinc ion binding; DNA-binding transcription activator activity, RNA polymerase II-specific; metal ion binding; RNA polymerase II cis-regulatory region sequence-specific DNA binding; steroid hormone receptor activity; nuclear receptor activity; core promoter sequence-specific DNA binding; protein binding; histone acetyltransferase binding; glucocorticoid receptor binding; transcription coactivator binding; protein kinase binding; DNA-binding transcription factor activity, RNA polymerase II-specific; cAMP response element binding; RNA polymerase II transcription regulatory region sequence-specific DNA binding
Cellular component	transcription regulator complex; mast cell granule; nucleoplasm; nucleus
Biological process	negative regulation of neuron apoptotic process; cellular response to catecholamine stimulus; semicircular canal morphogenesis; regulation of transcription, DNA-templated; neuromuscular process controlling balance; positive regulation of epithelial cell proliferation; common myeloid progenitor cell proliferation; pyruvate oxidation; negative regulation of oxidative stress-induced neuron death; mesoderm formation; response to peptide hormone; negative regulation of apoptotic process; positive regulation of leukocyte apoptotic process; negative regulation of transcription by RNA polymerase II; regulation of smooth muscle cell proliferation; cellular response to leptin stimulus; transcription, DNA-templated; positive regulation of cardiac muscle hypertrophy; axon guidance; positive regulation of transcription, DNA-templated; adult behavior; positive regulation of cell cycle; negative regulation of hydrogen peroxide-induced neuron death; gastrulation; positive regulation of mast cell activation by Fc-epsilon receptor signaling pathway; animal organ regeneration; inner ear morphogenesis; positive regulation of mast cell cytokine production; cellular respiration; vestibular reflex; energy homeostasis; cellular response to corticotropin-releasing hormone stimulus; mast cell degranulation; transcription initiation from RNA polymerase II promoter; positive regulation of feeding behavior; positive regulation of glucose transmembrane transport; hippocampus development; positive regulation of monocyte aggregation; fat cell differentiation; response to hydrogen peroxide; regulation of type B pancreatic cell proliferation; positive regulation of transcription by RNA polymerase II; steroid hormone mediated signaling pathway; positive regulation of smooth muscle cell proliferation; positive regulation of fatty acid oxidation; intracellular receptor signaling pathway; regulation of megakaryocyte differentiation; platelet-derived growth factor receptor signaling pathway; positive regulation of vascular associated smooth muscle cell proliferation; positive regulation of vascular associated smooth muscle cell migration
Sources:Amigo / QuickGO
Orthologs
Databases	NCBI: entry; OMA: entry
Species	Human	Mouse
Entrez	8013	18124
Ensembl	ENSG00000119508	ENSMUSG00000028341
UniProt	Q92570	Q9QZB6
RefSeq (mRNA)	NM_006981; NM_173198; NM_173199; NM_173200	NM_015743; NM_001307989
RefSeq (protein)	NP_008912; NP_775291; NP_775292	NP_001294918; NP_056558
Location (UCSC)	Chr 9: 99.82 – 99.87 Mb	Chr 4: 48.05 – 48.09 Mb
PubMed search
- Wikidata
View/Edit Human	View/Edit Mouse

The nuclear receptor 4A3 (NR4A3) (nuclear receptor subfamily 4, group A, member 3) also known as neuron-derived orphan receptor 1 (NOR1) is a protein that in humans is encoded by the NR4A3 gene. NR4A3 is a member of the nuclear receptor family of intracellular transcription factors.

NR4A3 plays a central regulatory role in cell proliferation, differentiation, mitochondrial respiration, metabolism and apoptosis

== Interactions ==
NR4A3 has been shown to interact with SIX3.

== See also ==
- NUR nuclear receptor family
