= NR4A =

Family of proteins

NR4A (nuclear receptor subfamily 4A) is a family of orphan nuclear receptors which act as transcription factors in neuron development and maintenance. In 2006, it was shown that members of the NR4A family were implicated in the control of skeletal muscle metabolism.

Three members have been identified in humans:

- Nuclear receptor 4A1 (NR4A1),
- Nuclear receptor 4A2 (NR4A2), and
- Nuclear receptor 4A3 (NR4A3).
