= Nuclear receptor 4A2 =

Protein-coding gene in the species Homo sapiens

NR4A2
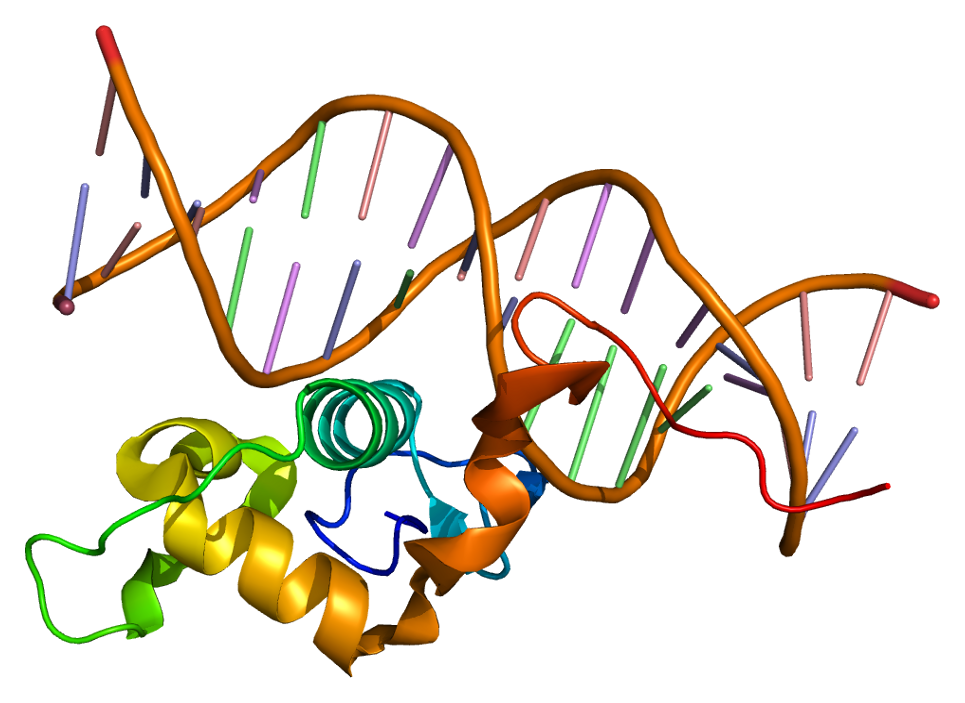

Identifiers
- Aliases: NR4A2, HZF-3, NOT, NURR1, RNR1, TINUR, nuclear receptor subfamily 4 group A member 2
- External IDs: OMIM: 601828; MGI: 1352456; GeneCards: NR4A2
Available structures
PDB	Ortholog search: PDBe RCSB
PDB	List of PDB id codes 1OVL

Gene location (Human)
Chr.	Chromosome 2 (human)
Band	2q24.1	Start	156,324,437 bp
Band	2q24.1	End	156,342,348 bp

Gene location (Mouse)
Chr.	Chromosome 2 (mouse)
Band	2 C1.1|2 31.66 cM	Start	56,996,842 bp
Band	2 C1.1|2 31.66 cM	End	57,014,015 bp
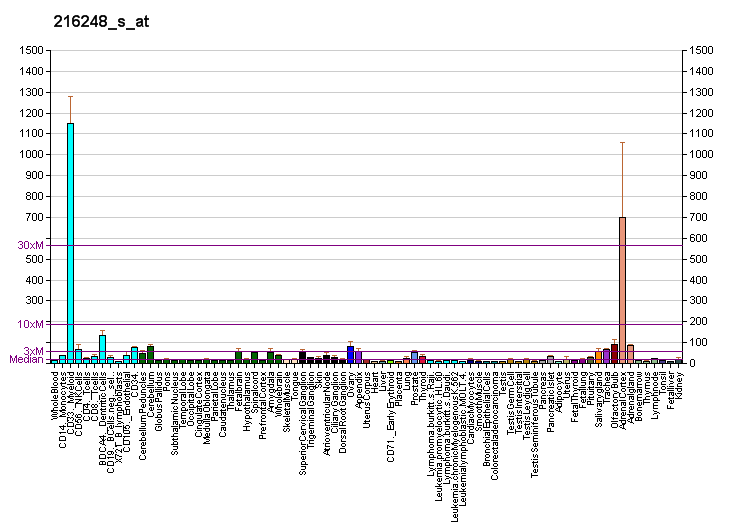

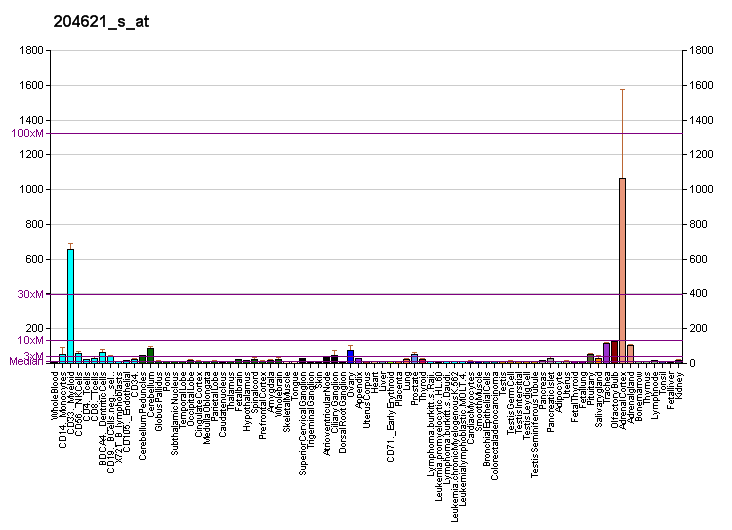

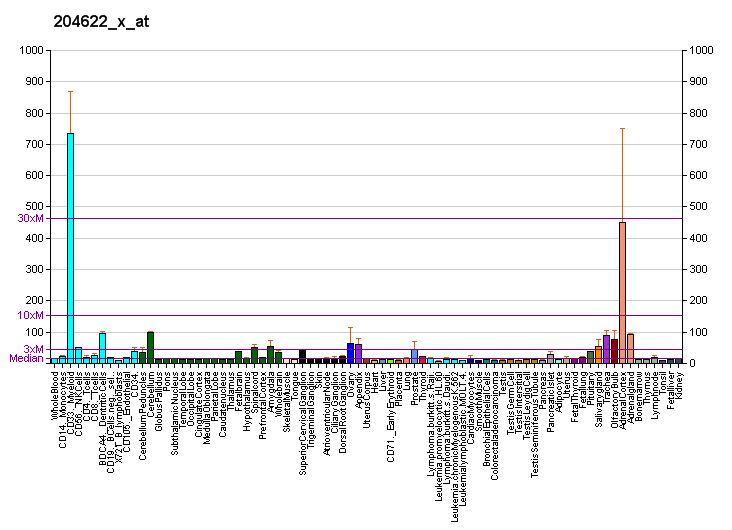
RNA expression pattern
Bgee	Human / Mouse (ortholog); Top expressed in: mucosa of paranasal sinus; gastric mucosa; trachea; spinal ganglia; cartilage tissue; mucosa of urinary bladder; cardia; seminal vesicula; trigeminal ganglion; tail of epididymis / Top expressed in: habenula; ventral tegmental area; parotid gland; Region I of hippocampus proper; substantia nigra; lobe of cerebellum; cerebellar vermis; subiculum; epithelium of stomach; submandibular gland; More reference expression data
BioGPS	More reference expression data
Gene ontology
Molecular function	retinoid X receptor binding; protein homodimerization activity; sequence-specific DNA binding; beta-catenin binding; DNA-binding transcription activator activity, RNA polymerase II-specific; steroid hormone receptor activity; RNA polymerase II transcription regulatory region sequence-specific DNA binding; protein binding; glucocorticoid receptor binding; DNA-binding transcription factor activity; zinc ion binding; metal ion binding; DNA binding; protein heterodimerization activity; nuclear receptor activity; RNA polymerase II cis-regulatory region sequence-specific DNA binding; DNA-binding transcription factor activity, RNA polymerase II-specific
Cellular component	cytoplasm; nucleus; nucleoplasm; nuclear speck; transcription regulator complex
Biological process	dopaminergic neuron differentiation; cellular response to oxidative stress; response to hypoxia; response to amphetamine; nervous system development; neuron maturation; steroid hormone mediated signaling pathway; central nervous system projection neuron axonogenesis; regulation of transcription, DNA-templated; central nervous system neuron differentiation; negative regulation of apoptotic signaling pathway; cellular response to corticotropin-releasing hormone stimulus; positive regulation of transcription, DNA-templated; regulation of respiratory gaseous exchange; regulation of dopamine metabolic process; adult locomotory behavior; regulation of gene expression; habenula development; positive regulation of catalytic activity; fat cell differentiation; post-embryonic development; dopamine biosynthetic process; transcription initiation from RNA polymerase II promoter; negative regulation of neuron apoptotic process; canonical Wnt signaling pathway; general adaptation syndrome; neuron differentiation; signal transduction; dopamine metabolic process; transcription, DNA-templated; intracellular receptor signaling pathway; neuron migration; negative regulation of transcription by RNA polymerase II; positive regulation of transcription by RNA polymerase II; cellular response to extracellular stimulus; midbrain dopaminergic neuron differentiation; gene expression; transcription by RNA polymerase II
Sources:Amigo / QuickGO
Orthologs
Databases	NCBI: entry; OMA: entry
Species	Human	Mouse
Entrez	4929	18227
Ensembl	ENSG00000153234	ENSMUSG00000026826
UniProt	P43354	Q06219
RefSeq (mRNA)	NM_006186; NM_173171; NM_173172; NM_173173	NM_001139509; NM_013613
RefSeq (protein)	NP_006177; NP_775265; NP_006177.1	NP_001132981; NP_038641
Location (UCSC)	Chr 2: 156.32 – 156.34 Mb	Chr 2: 57 – 57.01 Mb
PubMed search
- Wikidata
View/Edit Human	View/Edit Mouse

The nuclear receptor 4A2 (NR4A2) (nuclear receptor subfamily 4 group A member 2) also known as nuclear receptor related 1 protein (NURR1) is a protein that in humans is encoded by the NR4A2 gene. NR4A2 is a member of the nuclear receptor family of intracellular transcription factors.

NR4A2 plays a key role in the maintenance of the dopaminergic system of the brain. Heterozygous loss-of-function variants in NR4A2 cause a rare autosomal dominant condition known as NR4A2-related disorder, which is characterised by developmental delay and intellectual disability, prominent language impairment, and, in a substantial minority, epilepsy and dopa-responsive dystonia or parkinsonism. Separately, the gene has been investigated as a susceptibility factor for late-onset Parkinson's disease, but the evidence remains inconclusive. Four transcript variants encoding four distinct isoforms have been identified for this gene. Additional alternate splice variants may exist, but their full-length nature has not been determined.

== Structure ==
One investigation conducted research on the structure and found that NR4A2 does not contain a ligand-binding cavity but a patch filled with hydrophobic side chains. Non-polar amino acid residues of NR4A2's co-regulators, SMRT and NCoR, bind to this hydrophobic patch. Analysis of tertiary structure has shown that the binding surface of the ligand-binding domain is located on the grooves of the 11th and 12th alpha helices. This study also found essential structural components of this hydrophobic patch, to be the three amino acids residues, F574, F592, L593; mutation of any these three inhibits LBD activity.

== Function ==
=== Dopaminergic development ===
This protein is thought to be critical to development of the dopaminergic phenotype in the midbrain, as mice without NR4A2 are lacking expression of this phenotype. This is further confirmed by studies showing that forced NR4A2 expression in naïve precursor cells leads to complete dopaminergic phenotype gene expression.

While NR4A2 is a key protein in inducing this phenotype, there are other factors required, as expressing NR4A2 in isolation fails to produce it. One of these suggested factors is winged-helix transcription factor 2 (Foxa2). Studies have found these two factors to be within the same region of developing dopaminergic neurons, and both were required to have expression for the dopaminergic phenotype.

=== Inflammation ===
Research has been conducted on NR4A2's role in inflammation, and may provide important information in treating disorders caused by dopaminergic neuron disease. Inflammation in the central nervous system can result from activated microglia (macrophage analogs for the central nervous system) and other pro-inflammatory factors, such as bacterial lipopolysaccharide (LPS). LPS binds to toll-like receptors (TLR), which induces inflammatory gene expression by promoting signal-dependent transcription factors. To determine which cells are dopaminergic, experiments measured the enzyme tyrosine hydroxylase (TH), which is needed for dopamine synthesis. It has been shown that NR4A2 protects dopaminergic neurons from LPS-induced inflammation by reducing inflammatory gene expression in microglia and astrocytes. When a short hairpin RNA for NR4A2 was expressed in microglia and astrocytes, these cells produced inflammatory mediators such as TNF-alpha, nitric oxide synthase, and interleukin-1 beta (IL-1β), supporting the conclusion that reduced NR4A2 promotes inflammation and leads to cell death of dopaminergic neurons. NR4A2 interacts with the transcription factor complex NF-κB-p65 on the inflammatory gene promoters. However, NR4A2 is dependent on other factors to be able to participate in these interactions. NR4A2 needs to be sumoylated and its co-regulating factor, glycogen synthase kinase 3, needs to be phosphorylated for these interactions to occur. Sumolyated NR4A2 recruits CoREST, a complex made of several proteins that assembles chromatin remodeling enzymes. The NR4A2/CoREST complex inhibits transcription of inflammatory genes.

== Clinical significance ==
=== NR4A2-related neurodevelopmental disorder ===
Heterozygous loss-of-function variants in NR4A2 cause a distinct neurodevelopmental disorder, inherited in an autosomal dominant pattern. OMIM calls it intellectual developmental disorder with language impairment and early-onset DOPA-responsive dystonia-parkinsonism, abbreviated IDLDP. Orphanet uses a similar name, developmental delay-language impairment-dopa responsive dystonia-parkinsonism syndrome. The most recent literature also uses NR4A2-related disorder. ClinGen rates the gene-disease relationship as Definitive. The group that assessed it was the Intellectual Disability and Autism Gene Curation Expert Panel, in 2021.

==== Signs and symptoms ====
A 2024 systematic review analysed 19 patients in detail and excluded multi-gene deletions. A 2025 systematic review and case series pooled 32 patients, 30 of them from 16 published studies plus two of the authors' own, with 31 unique variants and a median age of 12.

In the 2024 review, 19 of 19 showed signs of developmental delay or intellectual disability, compared with 93% in the 2025 review. In the 2024 review, 14 of 19 had a language disorder, compared with 63% in the 2025 review. Separately, the 2024 review reports moderate to severe expressive and receptive impairment in "at least 42%". The "at least" is because information was unavailable in 5 of the 19. These are two different measures. In the 2024 review, 10 of 19 showed neuropsychiatric symptoms comprising aggressive behaviour, anxiety, ADHD and autism.

Epilepsy was observed in 8 of 19 in the 2024 review, and recurrent seizures or epilepsy in 41% in the 2025 review. Movement disorders were present in 7 of 19 in the 2024 review, including dystonia, chorea or ataxia, compared with 31% in the 2025 review. The 2024 review considers its own figure probably an underestimate, since onset is often in late adolescence or young adulthood. That figure rises to 5 of 9 (55%) among patients over 18 and 4 of 5 (80%) in patients over 30.

The 2025 review reported extra-neurological features in 47% overall, consisting of craniofacial dysmorphism in 25%, musculoskeletal anomalies in 28%, gastrointestinal anomalies in 19% and renal anomalies in 6%. Severity ranges from mild to severe, with wide phenotypic heterogeneity; the least affected have only mild deficits and attend mainstream schools.

==== Genetics and mechanism ====
Loss of function from monoallelic haploinsufficiency drives the condition in an autosomal dominant pattern, with a 2024 review finding that every reported variant occurred de novo except for two cases where inheritance could not be determined. ClinGen backed up this haploinsufficiency mechanism in September 2022 by giving it a score of 3 (their highest rating, meaning there is firm evidence that losing a single copy leads to disease) while assigning a 0 for triplosensitivity because data there is still lacking. That intolerance to single-copy loss shows up clearly in population genetics: gnomAD v4 records just 1 observed loss-of-function variant against an expected 50.5 (pLI = 1.00, LOEUF = 0.094).

The 2024 review catalogued nine missense, six frameshift, two nonsense, and two splicing variants, while a 2025 review counted 31 unique variants across 32 patients. A 2020 study by Singh and colleagues found no apparent genotype–phenotype correlation overall. When looking specifically at epilepsy, the 2024 review likewise found no clear correlation with mutation type or location along the gene; epilepsy was more frequent with truncating variants (6 of 10) than missense variants (2 of 9), but the difference was not statistically significant (p = 0.168, Fisher exact test).

==== Diagnosis ====
Diagnosis is established through genomic testing. NR4A2 is rated as diagnostic-grade (Green) for monoallelic variants on both PanelApp Australia's "Intellectual disability syndromic and non-syndromic" panel (Version 2.62) and the Genomics England "Intellectual disability" panel (Version 10.90). This Green rating indicates that there is sufficient clinical evidence to use the gene in routine diagnostic reporting.

==== Management ====
The 2024 review notes that developing a gene-targeted therapy is currently "limited by the absence of proven, effective chemical tools". The dystonia and parkinsonism associated with the condition respond to levodopa. In the same review, motor development was delayed in nine patients, none of whom were reported as failing to achieve independent walking; in one case this was achieved only after treatment with levodopa. Epilepsy proved drug-resistant in 3 of the 8 cases in which it was described. The review also reported a patient who developed oculogyric crises after starting the dopamine antagonist olanzapine, and suggested this could reflect an increased vulnerability to extrapyramidal symptoms with those drugs.

==== Epidemiology ====
Orphanet estimates the condition's prevalence at under 1 in 1,000,000. As of August 2026, the database reported approximately 15 cases worldwide.

==== History ====
In 2017, Reuter and colleagues reported a female patient with a de novo deletion covering NR4A2 alone, who presented with severe language impairment and mild cognitive impairment. While larger deletions in the region had been described previously, this was the first reported case of a deletion restricted to that single gene.

In 2018, Lévy and colleagues reported three further patients with de novo 2q24.1 deletions, two involving NR4A2 alone and one also encompassing the first exon of GPD2. They suggested that NR4A2 haploinsufficiency is implicated with high penetrance, and described a phenotype that included language impairment, developmental delay, intellectual disability and/or autism spectrum disorder.

In 2020, Singh and colleagues reported nine unrelated patients with de novo NR4A2 variants, which brought epilepsy into the documented phenotype alongside features such as hypotonia. In the same year, Wirth and colleagues reported two patients with a history of mild intellectual disability in childhood who developed dystonia parkinsonism in early adulthood. They concluded that dystonia or parkinsonism may appear years after the initial symptoms, noting that while the patients' brain MRIs were normal, DATscans suggested bilateral dopaminergic denervation.

Also in 2020, Kaplanis and colleagues analysed 31,058 parent-offspring trios and identified 285 genes significantly associated with developmental disorders, confirming NR4A2 as one of them.

=== Parkinson's disease ===
Research into NR4A2 includes a separate, longer-standing investigation into its potential role as a susceptibility factor for late-onset Parkinson's disease (catalogued as OMIM 168600, distinct from the neurodevelopmental disorder under OMIM 619911). The gene was investigated in this context because of its established role in the differentiation and maintenance of midbrain dopamine neurons.

In 2017, a meta-analysis by Liu and colleagues pooled 18 case-control studies covering 6,150 cases and 5,919 controls. They found that NR4A2 polymorphisms were generally not significantly associated with Parkinson's disease, with the exception of the rs35479735 variant under a homozygous model, and called for further study. More recent systematic reviews examining Latin American and Mexican populations have also highlighted NR4A2 as a potential risk locus, though both call for further replication and larger studies.

This research into late-onset Parkinson's susceptibility is distinct from the early-onset, dopa-responsive dystonia-parkinsonism observed in the NR4A2 loss-of-function disorder; the two involve entirely different variant classes, ages of onset and levels of diagnostic evidence.

== Applications ==
NR4A2 induces tyrosine hydroxylase (TH) expression, which eventually leads to differentiation into dopaminergic neurons. NR4A2 has been demonstrated to induce differentiation in CNS precursor cells in vitro but they require additional factors to reach full maturity and dopaminergic differentiation. Therefore, NR4A2 modulation may be promising for generation of dopaminergic neurons for Parkinson's disease research, yet implantation of these induced cells as therapy treatments, has had limited results.

Transgenic C57bl6 mice heterozygous for Nurr1 show ~50% reduced Nurr1 mRNA and ~30% reduced TH expression. Dopamine levels in the striatum were also significantly reduced and these mice show behavioral effects indicative of dopaminergic sensitivity and susceptibility to dysfunction.

NR4A2 mRNA may be a useful biomarker for Parkinson's disease in combination with inflammatory cytokines.

== Knockout studies ==
Studies have shown that heterozygous knockout mice for the NR4A2 gene demonstrate reduced dopamine release. Initially this was compensated for by a decrease in the rate of dopamine reuptake; however, over time this reuptake could not make up for the reduced amount of dopamine being released. Coupled with the loss of dopamine receptor neurons, this can result in the onset of symptoms for Parkinson's disease.

== Interactions ==
NR4A2 has been shown to interact with:

- Beta-catenin,
- Pituitary homeobox 3,
- Retinoic acid receptor alpha, and
- Retinoic acid receptor beta.
