= ADK =

ADK may refer to:

== Companies and organizations ==
- Adirondack Mountain Club, a nonprofit organization in New York, New Jersey and Massachusetts
- ADK Corporation or Alpha Denshi, a video game development company in Japan
- Apna Dal (Kamerawadi), an Indian political party
- ADK Holdings, a Japanese advertising firm
- Lycée Anne de Kiev, a school in Kiev, Ukraine

== Places ==
- Adg or Adk, a village in Razavi Khorasan Province, Iran
- Adak Airport (IATA airport code), Alaska, US
- Ardwick railway station (National Rail code), in Greater Manchester, England, UK

== Science and technology ==
- Adenosine kinase, an enzyme that catalyzes the transfer of gamma-phosphate from ATP to adenosine
  - ADK (gene), the gene that in humans encodes adenosine kinase
- Adenylate kinase, a phosphotransferase enzyme that plays an important role in cellular energy homeostasis
- Android Open Accessory Development Kit
- Windows Assessment and Deployment Kit, a collection of tools
- ADK, a model for tunnel ionization

== Other uses ==
- ADK (automobile), a Belgian automobile manufactured between 1923 and 1930
- ADK/ADB class diesel multiple unit, class of units used on Auckland's suburban network
- Aggressors of Dark Kombat, an arcade game released by SNK and developed by Alpha Denshi Corp
- Dinesh Kanagaratnam or A.D.K. (born 1981), Sri Lankan R&B and hip hop artist and music producer
- ADK (honour), an honour for Members of the Order of Kinabalu, Malaysia
