= DGA =

DGA or D.G.A. may refer to:

== Codes ==
- Dangriga Airport in Dangriga, Belize (IATA Code: DGA)
- dga, the ISO 639-3 code for the Southern/Central Dagaare language

== Organizations and companies ==
- Democratic Governors Association, a Democratic Party-affiliated organization of U.S. state governors
- Direcția Generală Anticorupție, the Internal Affairs directorate of the Romanian Ministry of Interior and Administrative Reform
- Direction générale de l'armement, the French governmental organization for defence procurement
- Directors Guild of America, a motion picture industry labor union
- Disc Golf Association (DGA), a disc golf company
- Dramatists Guild of America, an organization of playwrights, composers and lyricists.

== Science and technology ==
- DGA, a series of planes built by Howard Aircraft Corporation
- Differential graded algebra
- Diglycolic acid
- Dissolved Gas Analysis, the analysis of gases dissolved in dielectric oils from high voltage transformers

=== Computing ===
- Direct Graphics Access, an X Window System extension
- Domain generation algorithm, a family of algorithms used by malware to obfuscate their original Command & Control servers' IP address

== Other uses ==
- Data Governance Act, legislative proposal by the European Commission
- Designer graphique agréé, a Canadian professional designation for graphic design
- Diego Garcia, island of the British Indian Ocean Territory, ITU country code
- Dietary Guidelines for Americans

== See also ==
- ADG (disambiguation)
