= Streptomyces cuspidosporus =

Scientific classification
- Domain: Bacteria
- Kingdom: Bacillati
- Phylum: Actinomycetota
- Class: Actinomycetes
- Order: Streptomycetales
- Family: Streptomycetaceae
- Genus: Streptomyces
- Species: S. cuspidosporus

Binomial name
- Streptomyces cuspidosporus Tresner et al. 1961

Type strain
- AS 4.1686, AS 4.1886, ATCC 33340, B-79, CBS 192.78, CGMCC 4.1686, DSM 41425, DSM 41653, IFO 12378, JCM 4316, KCC S-0316, KCTC 9718, NBRC 12378, NRRL B-5620, VKM Ac-599

Species of bacterium

Streptomyces cuspidosporus is a bacterium species from the genus of Streptomyces which has been isolated from soil in Kyoto, Japan. Streptomyces cuspidosporus produces xylanase, sparsomycin and tubercidin.

== See also ==
- List of Streptomyces species
