= ADG =

ADG or Adg may refer to:

== Businesses and organizations ==
- Airfield Defence Guards
- ADG, Asociación Deportiva Guanacasteca, Costa Rican soccer team
- Alpha Delta Gamma, a national fraternity
- Art Directors Guild
- Australian Directors' Guild
- Autonomous Design Group, an anti-capitalist artist collective

== People ==
- Amlan Das Gupta, Indian scholar
- Aubrey de Grey
- Aubrey Drake Graham

== Places ==
- Adg, a village in Iran
- Lenawee County Airport in Adrian, State of Michigan, US (IATA airport code ADG)

== Science, technology, and mathematics ==
- Active Data Guard
- Acyclic Directed Graph
- Advanced Data Guarding
- Air-driven generator
- Degaussing ship (US Navy hull classification symbol ADG)

== Other uses ==
- Additional Director General of Police, senior police rank in India
- Aerospace, Defense & Government
- Andegerebinha dialect, an Aboriginal language of Australia (ISO 639-3 code)
