= C12H13N5O4 =

The molecular formula C_{12}H_{13}N_{5}O_{4} may refer to:

- GS-441524
- Toyocamycin
