= GP3269 =

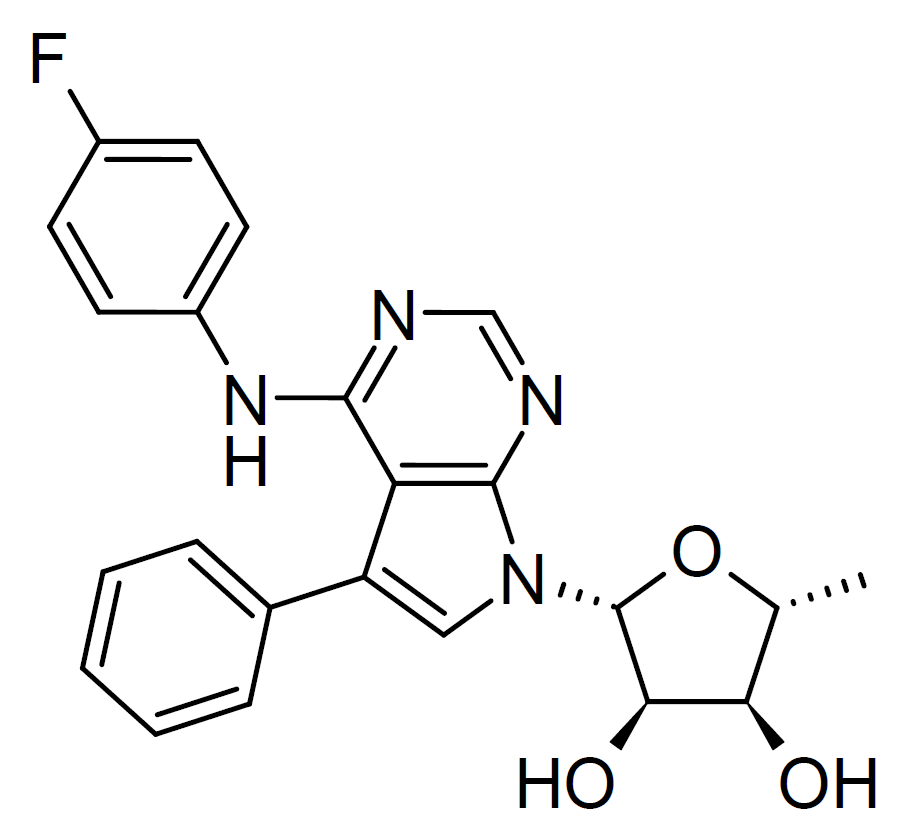

Identifiers
- IUPAC name: (2R,3R,4S,5R)-2-[4-(4-fluoroanilino)-5-phenylpyrrolo[2,3-d]pyrimidin-7-yl]-5-methyloxolane-3,4-diol
- CAS Number: 186393-42-0
- PubChem CID: 9802216
- ChemSpider: 7977978
- ChEMBL: ChEMBL66277

Chemical and physical data
- Formula: C_{23}H_{21}FN_{4}O_{3}
- Molar mass: 420.444 g·mol^{−1}
- 3D model (JSmol): Interactive image
- SMILES: C[C@@H]1[C@H]([C@H]([C@@H](O1)N2C=C(C3=C(N=CN=C32)NC4=CC=C(C=C4)F)C5=CC=CC=C5)O)O
- InChI: InChI=1S/C23H21FN4O3/c1-13-19(29)20(30)23(31-13)28-11-17(14-5-3-2-4-6-14)18-21(25-12-26-22(18)28)27-16-9-7-15(24)8-10-16/h2-13,19-20,23,29-30H,1H3,(H,25,26,27)/t13-,19-,20-,23-/m1/s1; Key:MULTXXBUCOCYME-HYYMDVBZSA-N

GP3269 is an experimental drug that acts as a selective inhibitor of the enzyme adenosine kinase. In animal studies it has analgesic and anticonvulsant effects.
