= A-286501 =

Identifiers
- IUPAC name: (1S,2R,3S,5R)-3-amino-5-(4-amino-5-bromopyrrolo[2,3-d]pyrimidin-7-yl)cyclopentane-1,2-diol
- CAS Number: 483341-15-7
- PubChem CID: 9862222
- ChemSpider: 8037918
- UNII: 8G293B8TT7

Chemical and physical data
- Formula: C_{11}H_{14}BrN_{5}O_{2}
- Molar mass: 328.170 g·mol^{−1}
- 3D model (JSmol): Interactive image
- SMILES: C1[C@@H]([C@H]([C@H]([C@@H]1N2C=C(C3=C(N=CN=C32)N)Br)O)O)N
- InChI: InChI=1S/C11H14BrN5O2/c12-4-2-17(6-1-5(13)8(18)9(6)19)11-7(4)10(14)15-3-16-11/h2-3,5-6,8-9,18-19H,1,13H2,(H2,14,15,16)/t5-,6+,8+,9-/m0/s1; Key:FKFYQPGMXTXSTC-LWIVVEGESA-N

A-286501 is an experimental drug that acts as a selective inhibitor of the enzyme adenosine kinase. In animal studies it has analgesic and antiinflammatory effects.
