= Tubercidin =

Chemical compound

Names
- IUPAC name (2R,3R,4S,5R)-2-(4-Aminopyrrolo[2,3-d]pyrimidin-7-yl)-5-(hydroxymethyl)oxolane-3,4-diol
- Other names: 7-Deazaadenosine; Antibiotic 155B2T; Antibiotic XK 101-1; Sparsamycin A; Sparsomycin A; Tubercidine

Identifiers
CAS Number	69-33-0
3D model (JSmol)	Interactive image
Beilstein Reference	38498
ChEBI	CHEBI:48267
ChEMBL	ChEMBL267099
ChemSpider	6009
DrugBank	DB03172
ECHA InfoCard	100.000.640
EC Number	200-703-4
IUPHAR/BPS	4755
MeSH	Tubercidin
PubChem CID	6245
RTECS number	UY8870000
UNII	M351LCX45Y
CompTox Dashboard (EPA)	DTXSID701018946
- InChI: InChI=1S/C11H14N4O4/c12-9-5-1-2-15(10(5)14-4-13-9)11-8(18)7(17)6(3-16)19-11/h1-2,4,6-8,11,16-18H,3H2,(H2,12,13,14)/t6-,7-,8-,11-/m1/s1 Key: HDZZVAMISRMYHH-KCGFPETGSA-N
- SMILES: C1=CN(C2=NC=NC(=C21)N)[C@H]3[C@@H]([C@@H]([C@H](O3)CO)O)O

Properties
Chemical formula	C_{11}H_{14}N_{4}O_{4}
Molar mass	266.257 g·mol^{−1}
Density	1.9 g/cm^{3}
Boiling point	648.8 °C (1,199.8 °F; 921.9 K)
Solubility in water	3000 mg/L
log P	–0.8
Vapor pressure	4.27×10^{−13} mmHg
Henry's law constant (k_{H})	2.69×10^{−22} atm-m^{3}/mole
Atmospheric OH rate constant	2.38×10^{−10} cm^{3}/molecule-sec
Acidity (pK_{a})	5.3

Pharmacology
Legal status	NZ: No individual approval but may be used under an appropriate group standard; US: Not approved

Hazards
- GHS labelling
Pictograms	(GHS06: Toxic)
Signal word	Danger
Hazard statements	H300
Precautionary statements	P264, P270, P301+P316, P321, P330, P405, P501
Flash point	346.2 °C
- Lethal dose or concentration (LD, LC)
LD_{50} (median dose)	16.g/kg (rat, oral); 1 mg/kg (rat, intraper.); 28.32 mg/kg (mouse, oral); 6 mg/kg (mouse, intraper.); 45 mg/kg (mouse, iv)
- Except where otherwise noted, data are given for materials in their standard state (at 25 °C [77 °F], 100 kPa). Infobox references

Tubercidin or 7-deaza-adenosine (7DA) is a naturally occurring nucleoside antibiotic and antimetabolite, chemically classified as an N-glycosylpyrrolopyrimidine. Structurally, it is a purine analog of adenosine due to which it readily substitutes for adenosine in biological systems. This incorporation into DNA and RNA can disrupt nucleic acid metabolism, leading to cytotoxic effects.

Tubercidin is produced by several microorganisms, including Streptomyces tubericidicus, Plectonema radiosum, and Actinopolyspora erythraea. It exhibits multiple biological activities, functioning as an antineoplastic agent, antibiotic antifungal agent, and bacterial metabolite. Because of its interference with nucleic acid synthesis, tubercidin shows promise for use in treating cancer and certain infections.

== Structure ==
Tubercidin is systematically named (2R,3R,4S,5R)-2-(4-aminopyrrolo[2,3-d]pyrimidin-7-yl)-5-(hydroxymethyl)oxolane-3,4-diol. It is an N-glycosylpyrrolopyrimidine ribonucleoside and a member of the 7-deazapurine class, characterized by the replacement of the nitrogen atom at position 7 of the purine ring with a carbon atom. This structural change allows tubercidin to mimic adenosine in biological systems. The 7-deaza modification makes it resistant to degradation by enzymes such as adenosine deaminase and adenosine phosphorylase, enabling it to persist longer inside cells. This stability enhances its ability to disrupt nucleic acid metabolism and other adenosine-dependent processes. This results in its potent biological activity and systemic toxicity. Other natural compounds like toyocamycin share this structural similarity, making 7-deazapurines an important class of bioactive nucleosides.

Adenosine	Tubercidin	Toyocamycin

== Occurrence ==
Tubercidin is naturally produced by several species of actinomycetes, particularly within the genus Streptomyces. It was first discovered in Streptomyces tubercidicus, but later identified in multiple other strains. The following species have been reported to produce tubercidin:

- Actinopolyspora erythraea
- Caulospongia biflabellata
- Hassallia byssoidea
- Lissoclinum timorense
- Plectonema radiosum
- Pseudophormidium radiosum
- Scytonema saleyeriense
- Streptomyces sparsogenes
- Streptomyces tubercidicus
- Tolypothrix byssoidea
- Tolypothrix distorta

== Biological activities ==
Due to its structural similarity to adenosine, tubercidin can interfere with various essential biological processes resultin in broad range of biological activities.

=== Anticancer activity ===
Tubercidin shows potent cytotoxic activity against various cancer cell lines, including P388 and A549 tumor cells, as well as human cancer cell lines such as HeLa, A375, and WM266. It has shown promising anti-small-cell lung cancer (SCLC) activity both in vitro and in vivo. It selectively exhibits strong cytotoxicity against SCLC cell lines (DMS 53 and DMS 114) at low concentrations (CC50 of 0.19 μM and 0.14 μM, respectively), with minimal impact on normal bronchial cells. In SCLC xenograft mouse models, tubercidin treatment (5 mg/kg, three times a week) significantly inhibited tumor growth, with some instances of complete tumor regression. The anticancer activity of tubercidin mainly arises due to the induction of apoptosis in these cells. 5-Iodotubercidin, a derivative of tubercidin, has been identified as a genotoxic agent and a potent activator of the tumor suppressor protein p53, triggering DNA damage, cell cycle arrest, and necroptosis in cancer models. Current research aims in developing less toxic derivatives of tubercidin by C6, C7, or C8 modifications on the purine ring. Additionally, new platinum(II) complexes of tubercidin are being investigated for their enhanced selectivity toward tumor cells.

=== Antiviral activity ===
Tubercidin displays broad-spectrum antiviral activity against a range of viruses. It has shown efficacy against SARS-CoV-2, influenza B virus (IBV), porcine reproductive and respiratory syndrome virus 2 (PRRSV), porcine epidemic diarrhea virus (PEDV), and SADS-CoV. It exhibits antiviral activity by interfering with multiple stages of the viral life cycle, including viral entry, replication, and release. It also suppresses the expression of viral non-structural protein 2 (nsp2) and activates innate immune responses through pathways such as RIG-I and NF-κB. Tubercidin also acts as a bispecific inhibitor targeting both the viral NSP16 methyltransferase and the host enzyme MTr1, both of which are essential for efficient SARS-CoV-2 replication. Its derivatives have demonstrated significant immunomodulatory effects, helping to reduce the hyperinflammatory response associated with SARS-CoV infection. One derivative, 5-Hydroxymethyltubercidin (HMTU), has shown strong antiviral activity against several flaviviruses—such as dengue, Zika, and yellow fever as well as various coronaviruses. Its mechanism involves inhibiting the viral RNA-dependent RNA polymerase (RdRp), leading to premature termination of viral RNA synthesis.

=== Antiparasitic activity ===
Tubercidin displays potent antiparasitic activity against a range of protozoan parasites, including Trypanosoma brucei, Trypanosoma gambiense, Trypanosoma congolense, Schistosoma mansoni, Schistosoma japonicum, and various species of Leishmania. A derivative, 3′-deoxytubercidin, has demonstrated strong antitrypanosomal activity. In mouse models, it successfully cured infections caused by Trypanosoma brucei evansi (Surra) and T. equiperdum (Dourine) when administered intraperitoneally, with no detectable toxicity at effective doses.

=== Antibacterial and antifungal activity ===
Tubercidin also exhibits antibiotic properties, showing activity against Mycobacterium tuberculosis and Streptococcus faecalis. It, along with its derivative 5-iodotubercidin also show notable antifungal effects, especially against Candida albicans, with its toxicity linked to uptake through the fungal concentrative nucleoside transporter (CNT).

== Mechanism of action ==
Tubercidin's biological effects mainly arise from its structural similarity to adenosine which enables it to interfere with fundamental cellular processes. After cellular uptake via nucleoside transporters, tubercidin can be converted by adenosine kinase into its mono-, di-, and triphosphate forms. These active metabolites mimic natural adenosine nucleotides and compete with them, disrupting the function of key enzymes like polymerases. As a result, tubercidin interferes with DNA replication, RNA transcription, and protein synthesis.

In addition to its broad effects on nucleic acid synthesis, tubercidin also targets specific enzymes and cellular pathways. One of its known targets is S-adenosylhomocysteine hydrolase (SAHH), an enzyme essential for maintaining proper methylation reactions by breaking down S-adenosylhomocysteine (SAH), a natural inhibitor of transmethylation. By inhibiting SAHH, tubercidin disrupts various methylation-dependent processes like cell signaling. It inhibits chemotaxis as well as chemotaxis-dependent cell streaming in organisms such as Dictyostelium and chemotaxis in neutrophils.

In parasitic organisms such as in Trypanosoma brucei, tubercidin has been found to inhibit glycolysis by targeting the enzyme phosphoglycerate kinase. Since trypanosomes rely heavily on glycolysis for energy production, this makes glycolytic enzymes attractive targets for antitrypanosomal drugs.

Tubercidin has also been shown to disrupt the function of nuclear speckles (NSs), which are essential subnuclear structures enriched with RNA-binding proteins involved in mRNA splicing and processing. Upon treatment with tubercidin, poly(A)+ RNAs become dispersed and degraded across the nucleoplasm, while SC35-marked nuclear speckles remain condensed. This suggests that tubercidin selectively impairs mRNA processing without completely dismantling the speckles themselves. Under stress conditions such as hypoxia or serum starvation, this disruption can worsen cellular damage and promote apoptosis, particularly in sensitive cells like cardiomyocytes.

== Toxicity ==
Despite potent biological activities, the clinical applications of tubercidin are significantly limited due to its toxicity to mammalian cells. This manifests itself mainly as hepatotoxicity, nephrotoxicity, and cardiotoxicity.

Cardiotoxicity is a notable concern with tubercidin, particularly in individuals with existing heart conditions like ischemic cardiomyopathy. Tubercidin promotes apoptosis in heart muscle cells under stress, especially in hypoxic or starved conditions. This effect appears to be linked to tubercidin's interference with nuclear speckles which are important for processing mRNA and regulating gene activity. By disrupting these functions, tubercidin may worsen damage in already weakened heart tissue.

Hepatotoxicity and nephrotoxicity have been observed in vivo in mice and in vitro with human bone marrow progenitor cells. In mice, intravenous doses of 45 mg/kg caused high mortality rates, mainly due to liver damage. Kidney injury was also noted at higher doses. Co-administering nucleoside transport inhibitors like nitrobenzylthioinosine 5'-monophosphate (NBMPR-P) helped reduce liver toxicity by changing how tubercidin is distributed in the body. However, at high doses, NBMPR-P increased the risk of kidney damage.

== Clinical use and derivatives ==
Early Phase I clinical trials involving direct intravenous administration of tubercidin in humans found the drug to be unsuitable due to significant toxicity. Reported side effects included hepatic toxicity, renal toxicity like proteinuria and uremia, and hematological toxicity like venous thrombosis and leukopenia. These toxic effects have been a major barrier to the clinical use of tubercidin.

The bioactivity of tubercidin along with its toxicity has spurred extensive exploration into its derivatives particularly with modifications at C6, C7 and C8. Some of the key ones are:

- 5′-O-α-D-Glucopyranosyl tubercidin: It is a disaccharide nucleoside isolated from blue-green algae. It exhibits antifungal activity.
- 5-Iodotubercidin: It is a genotoxic agent with anticancer properties. It activates tumor suppressor protein P53 leading to DNA damage and subsequently cell cycle arrest and cell death in cancer cells. It also has antifungal properties.
- 5-Hydroxymethyltubercidin (HMTU): It is a potent antiviral activity against a range og coronaviruses and flaviviruses, including SARS-CoV-2. It inhibits viral RNA-dependent RNA polymerase, thereby disrupting RNA synthesis by chain termination.
- 3′-Deoxytubercidin: It is an antitrypanosomal agent with no toxicity at therapeutic doses.

Modification of the ribose ring has also yielded results in the form of MK-608 (7-deaza-2'-C-methyladenosine), though it was ultimately unsuccessful in human clinical trial.
