= Streptomyces tubercidicus =

Scientific classification
- Domain: Bacteria
- Kingdom: Bacillati
- Phylum: Actinomycetota
- Class: Actinomycetes
- Order: Streptomycetales
- Family: Streptomycetaceae
- Genus: Streptomyces
- Species: S. tubercidicus

Binomial name
- Streptomyces tubercidicus Nakamura 1961

Type strain
- AS 4.1414, ATCC 25502, BCRC 11886, CBS 644.69, CCRC 11886, CCTM La 2930, CECT 3272, CGMCC 4.1414, DSM 40261, DSMZ 40261, ETH 28384, IFM 1064, IFO 13090, IMET 43517, IPCR 585, ISP 5261, JCM 4054, JCM 4558, KCC S-0054, KCC S-0558, KCTC 9109, Lanoot R-8726, LMG 19361, MTCC 1820, NBRC 13090, NRRL B-5440, NRRL-ISP 5261, R-8726, RIA 1282, Suzuki 585, VKM Ac-1073

Species of bacterium

Streptomyces tubercidicus is a bacterium species from the genus of Streptomyces which has been isolated from soil in Japan. Streptomyces tubercidicus produces tubercidin and ascomycin.

== See also ==
- List of Streptomyces species
