= ERN1 =

Protein-coding gene in the species Homo sapiens

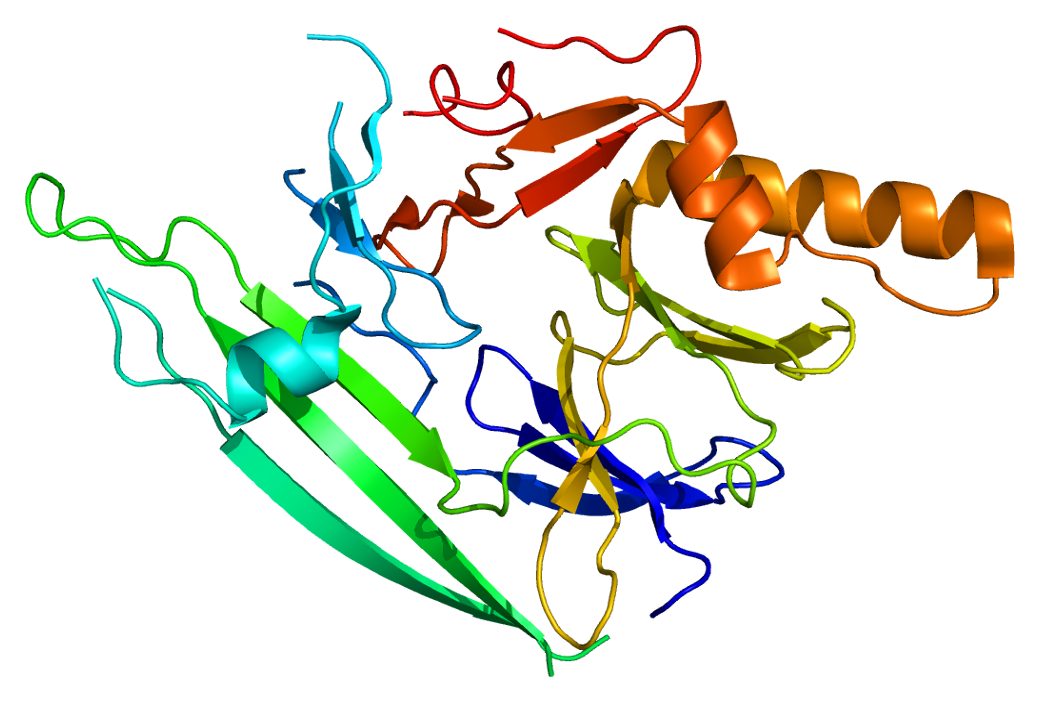

Identifiers
- Aliases: ERN1, IRE1, IRE1P, IRE1a, hIRE1p, endoplasmic reticulum to nucleus signaling 1
- External IDs: OMIM: 604033; MGI: 1930134; GeneCards: ERN1
Available structures
PDB	Ortholog search: PDBe RCSB
PDB	List of PDB id codes 2HZ6, 3P23, 4U6R, 4Z7G, 4Z7H, 4YZC, 4YZ9, 4YZD, 5HGI
Enzyme activity
EC #	BRENDA	ExPASy	KEGG	MetaCyc
2.7.11.1	↗	↗	↗	↗

Gene location (Human)
Chr.	Chromosome 17 (human)
Band	17q23.3	Start	64,039,080 bp
Band	17q23.3	End	64,130,819 bp

Gene location (Mouse)
Chr.	Chromosome 11 (mouse)
Band	11|11 E1	Start	106,285,476 bp
Band	11|11 E1	End	106,378,678 bp
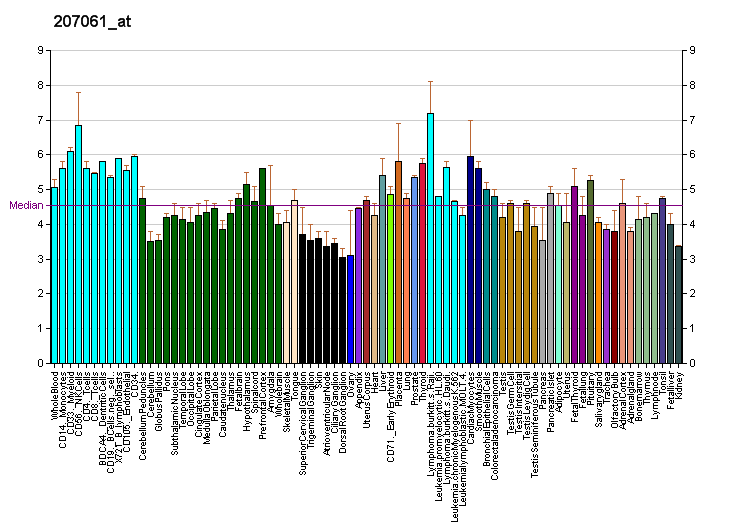
RNA expression pattern
Bgee	Human / Mouse (ortholog); Top expressed in: parotid gland; decidua; amniotic fluid; secondary oocyte; right adrenal cortex; seminal vesicula; left adrenal cortex; body of pancreas; caput epididymis; germinal epithelium / Top expressed in: secondary oocyte; primary oocyte; gastrula; decidua; seminal vesicula; lacrimal gland; submandibular gland; adrenal gland; zygote; parotid gland; More reference expression data
BioGPS	More reference expression data
Gene ontology
Molecular function	metal ion binding; nucleotide binding; ADP binding; ribonuclease activity; identical protein binding; protein kinase activity; transferase activity; magnesium ion binding; hydrolase activity; Hsp70 protein binding; kinase activity; Hsp90 protein binding; catalytic activity; endonuclease activity; ATP binding; enzyme binding; protein binding; endoribonuclease activity; protein serine/threonine kinase activity; platelet-derived growth factor receptor binding; protein homodimerization activity; unfolded protein binding
Cellular component	AIP1-IRE1 complex; cytoplasm; integral component of membrane; mitochondrion; IRE1-TRAF2-ASK1 complex; IRE1-RACK1-PP2A complex; nuclear inner membrane; Ire1 complex; membrane; integral component of endoplasmic reticulum membrane; endoplasmic reticulum; endoplasmic reticulum membrane
Biological process	positive regulation of endoplasmic reticulum unfolded protein response; mRNA catabolic process; transcription, DNA-templated; insulin metabolic process; peptidyl-serine autophosphorylation; cellular response to vascular endothelial growth factor stimulus; protein autophosphorylation; metabolism; apoptotic process; mRNA splicing, via endonucleolytic cleavage and ligation; intrinsic apoptotic signaling pathway in response to endoplasmic reticulum stress; cellular response to glucose stimulus; peptidyl-serine trans-autophosphorylation; protein phosphorylation; response to unfolded protein; mRNA processing; response to endoplasmic reticulum stress; regulation of transcription, DNA-templated; endothelial cell proliferation; regulation of macroautophagy; phosphorylation; endoplasmic reticulum unfolded protein response; positive regulation of vascular associated smooth muscle cell proliferation; RNA phosphodiester bond hydrolysis, endonucleolytic; positive regulation of RNA splicing; IRE1-mediated unfolded protein response; mRNA cleavage involved in mRNA processing; mRNA cleavage; Unfolded protein response
Sources:Amigo / QuickGO
Orthologs
Databases	NCBI: entry; OMA: entry
Species	Human	Mouse
Entrez	2081	78943
Ensembl	ENSG00000178607	ENSMUSG00000020715
UniProt	O75460	Q9EQY0
RefSeq (mRNA)	NM_152461; NM_001433	NM_023913
RefSeq (protein)	NP_001424	NP_076402
Location (UCSC)	Chr 17: 64.04 – 64.13 Mb	Chr 11: 106.29 – 106.38 Mb
PubMed search
- Wikidata
View/Edit Human	View/Edit Mouse

The serine/threonine-protein kinase/endoribonuclease inositol-requiring enzyme 1 α (IRE1α) is an enzyme that in humans is encoded by the ERN1 gene.

== Function ==
The protein encoded by this gene is the ER to nucleus signalling 1 protein, a human homologue of the yeast Ire1 gene product. This protein possesses intrinsic kinase activity and an endoribonuclease activity and it is important in altering gene expression as a response to endoplasmic reticulum-based stress signals (mainly the unfolded protein response). Two alternatively spliced transcript variants encoding different isoforms have been found for this gene.

== Signaling ==
IRE1α possesses two functional enzymatic domains, an endonuclease and a trans-autophosphorylation kinase domain. Upon activation, IRE1α oligomerizes and carries out an unconventional RNA splicing activity, removing an intron from the X-box binding protein 1 (XBP1) mRNA, and allowing it to become translated into a functional transcription factor, XBP1s. XBP1s upregulates ER chaperones and endoplasmic reticulum associated degradation (ERAD) genes that facilitate recovery from ER stress.

== Clinical significance ==
As IRE1α is a primary sensor for unfolded protein response, its disruption could be linked with neurodegenerative diseases, wherein the accumulation of intracellular toxic proteins serves as one of the key pathogenic mechanisms. IRE1 signalling is considered to be pathogenic in Alzheimer's disease, Parkinson's disease and amyotrophic lateral sclerosis.

== Interactions ==
ERN1 has been shown to interact with Heat shock protein 90kDa alpha (cytosolic), member A1.

== Inhibitors ==
Two types of inhibitors exist targeting either the catalytic core of the RNase domain or the ATP-binding pocket of the kinase domain.

=== Rnase domain inhibitors ===
Salicylaldehydes (3-methoxy-6-bromosalicylaldehyde, 4μ8C, MKC-3946), STF-083010, toyocamycin.

=== Atp-binding pocket ===
Sunitinib and APY29 inhibit the ATP-binding pocket but allosterically activate the IRE1α RNase domain.

Compound 3 prevents kinase activity, oligomerization and RNase activity.

== Specific roles in the brain ==
Apart from its function as the main regulator of cellular stress and the Unfolded Protein Response pathway, IRE1α also has its non-canonical roles in the brain. For one, it has been shown to act as a scaffold, which recruits and regulates filamin A. This way, IRE1α controls cytoskeletal remodeling and cell migration during brain development. Additionally, IRE1α regulates protein synthesis rates in the developing murine cortex in a mechanism involving translation initiation and elongation. Loss of IRE1α leads to ribosomal stalling, and loss of upper layer Satb2-expressing neurons at the expense of deeper layer, CTIP2-expressing ones. Moreover, IRE1α controls the proteostasis of eIF4A1 to drive translation of neuronal subtype determinants.
