= ABT-702 =

Identifiers
- IUPAC name: 5-(3-bromophenyl)-7-(6-morpholin-4-ylpyridin-3-yl)pyrido[2,3-d]pyrimidin-4-amine
- CAS Number: 214697-26-4
- PubChem CID: 1973
- IUPHAR/BPS: 5131
- ChemSpider: 1897
- UNII: 2P206WS5B3
- ChEBI: CHEBI:104129
- ChEMBL: ChEMBL66089

Chemical and physical data
- Formula: C_{22}H_{19}BrN_{6}O
- Molar mass: 463.339 g·mol^{−1}
- 3D model (JSmol): Interactive image
- SMILES: C1COCCN1C2=NC=C(C=C2)C3=NC4=NC=NC(=C4C(=C3)C5=CC(=CC=C5)Br)N
- InChI: InChI=1S/C22H19BrN6O/c23-16-3-1-2-14(10-16)17-11-18(28-22-20(17)21(24)26-13-27-22)15-4-5-19(25-12-15)29-6-8-30-9-7-29/h1-5,10-13H,6-9H2,(H2,24,26,27,28); Key:RQCXKDWOCUJWQZ-UHFFFAOYSA-N

ABT-702 is an experimental drug that acts as a selective inhibitor of the enzyme adenosine kinase. In animal studies it has analgesic and antiinflammatory effects, and has been useful in investigating the potential applications of adenosine kinase inhibitors in a number of medical applications.
