= Adenosine kinase =

Enzyme

ADK
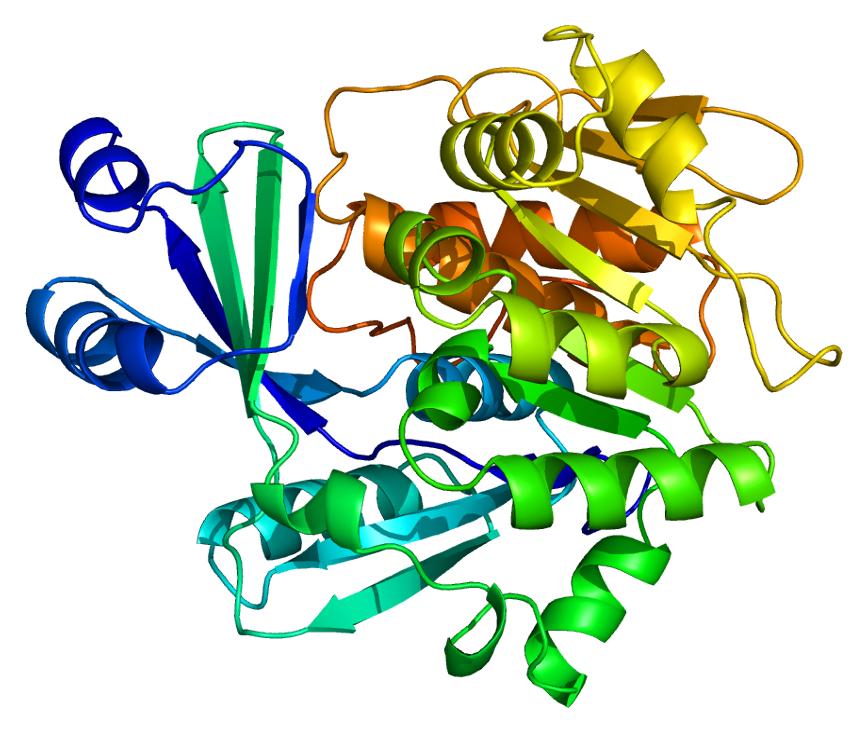

Identifiers
- Aliases: ADK, Adk, 2310026J05Rik, 5033405D03Rik, AI255373, AI987814, Ak, adenosine kinase
- External IDs: OMIM: 102750; MGI: 87930; GeneCards: ADK
Available structures
PDB	Ortholog search: PDBe RCSB
PDB	List of PDB id codes 1BX4, 2I6A, 2I6B, 4O1L
Enzyme activity
EC #	BRENDA	ExPASy	KEGG	MetaCyc
2.7.1.20	↗	↗	↗	↗

Gene location (Human)
Chr.	Chromosome 10 (human)
Band	10q22.2|10q11-q24	Start	74,151,202 bp
Band	10q22.2|10q11-q24	End	74,709,963 bp

Gene location (Mouse)
Chr.	Chromosome 14 (mouse)
Band	14|14 A3	Start	21,102,642 bp
Band	14|14 A3	End	21,498,637 bp
RNA expression pattern
Bgee	Human / Mouse (ortholog); Top expressed in: cartilage tissue; liver; right lobe of liver; Achilles tendon; oral cavity; gums; mucosa of esophagus; islet of Langerhans; ventricular zone; gingival epithelium / Top expressed in: left lobe of liver; intercostal muscle; deep cerebellar nuclei; myocardium of ventricle; left lung lobe; gallbladder; pontine nuclei; right lung lobe; digastric muscle; soleus muscle; More reference expression data
BioGPS	n/a
Gene ontology
Molecular function	transferase activity; nucleotide binding; metal ion binding; kinase activity; phosphotransferase activity, alcohol group as acceptor; ATP binding; adenosine kinase activity; carbohydrate kinase activity; RNA binding
Cellular component	nucleoplasm; nucleus; cytoplasm; cytosol
Biological process	purine ribonucleoside salvage; phosphorylation; purine-containing compound salvage; ribonucleoside monophosphate biosynthetic process; AMP salvage; dATP biosynthetic process; adenosine salvage; carbohydrate phosphorylation
Sources:Amigo / QuickGO
Orthologs
Databases	NCBI: entry; OMA: entry
Species	Human	Mouse
Entrez	132	11534
Ensembl	ENSG00000156110	ENSMUSG00000039197
UniProt	P55263	P55264
RefSeq (mRNA)	NM_001123; NM_001202449; NM_001202450; NM_006721; NM_001369123 NM_001369124	NM_001243041; NM_134079
RefSeq (protein)	NP_001114; NP_001189378; NP_001189379; NP_006712	NP_001229970; NP_598840
Location (UCSC)	Chr 10: 74.15 – 74.71 Mb	Chr 14: 21.1 – 21.5 Mb
PubMed search
- Wikidata
View/Edit Human	View/Edit Mouse

adenosine kinase
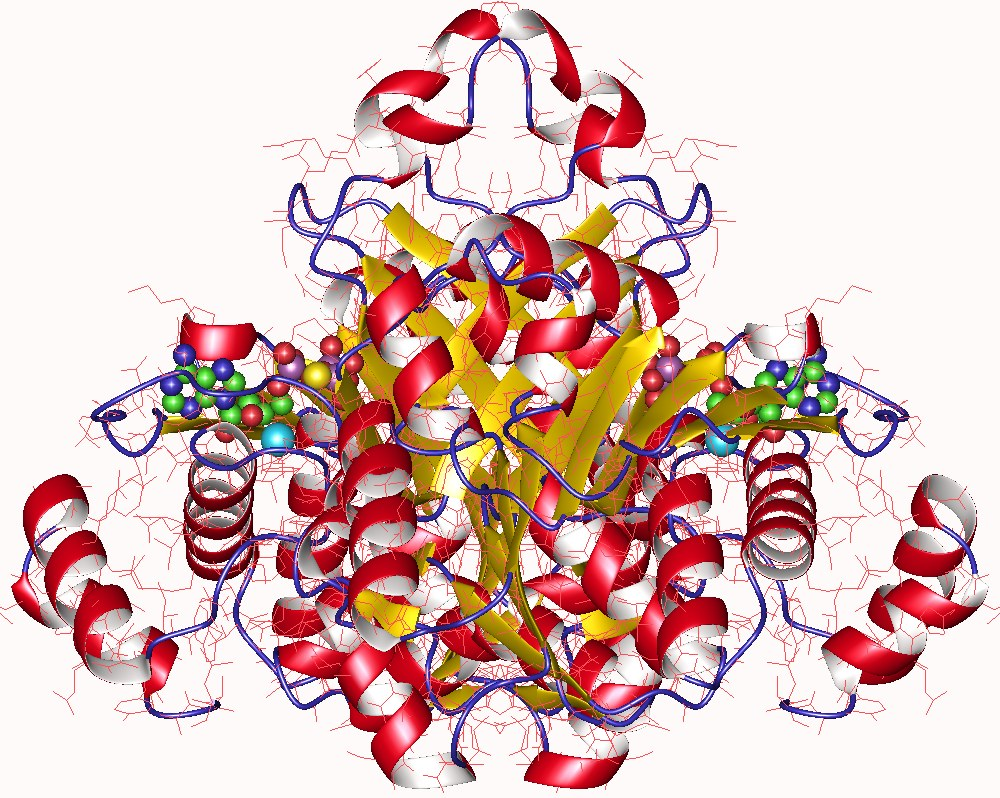
- Adenosine kinase dimer, Mycobacterium tuberculosis

Identifiers
- EC no.: 2.7.1.20
- CAS no.: 9027-72-9

Databases
- BRENDA: enzyme data
- ExPASy: NiceZyme view
- KEGG: enzyme entry
- MetaCyc: metabolic pathway
- Rhea: reactions
- PDB structures: RCSB PDB PDBe PDBsum
- Gene Ontology: AmiGO / QuickGO
Search
- PMC: articles
- PubMed: articles
- NCBI: proteins

Adenosine kinase (AdK; EC 2.7.1.20) is an enzyme that catalyzes the transfer of gamma-phosphate from Adenosine triphosphate (ATP) to adenosine (Ado) leading to formation of Adenosine monophosphate (AMP). In humans, AdK is encoded by the ADK gene. In addition to its well-studied role in controlling the cellular concentration of Ado, AdK also plays an important role in the maintenance of methylation reactions. All S-adenosylmethionine-dependent transmethylation reactions in cells lead to production of S-adenosylhomocysteine (SAH), which is cleaved by SAH hydrolase into Ado and homocysteine. The failure to efficiently remove these end products (Ado removed by phosphorylation by AdK) can result in buildup of SAH, which is a potent inhibitor of all transmethylation reactions. The disruption of AdK gene (-/-) in mice causes neonatal hepatic steatosis, a fatal condition characterized by rapid microvesicular fat infiltration, leading to early postnatal death. The liver was the main organ affected in these animals and in it the levels of adenine nucleotides were decreased, while those of SAH were elevated. Recently, missense mutations in the AdK gene in humans which result in AdK deficiency have also been shown to cause hypermethioninemia, encephalopathy and abnormal liver function.

== Biochemical properties ==
AdK is a monomeric protein (~ 38-40 kDa), which works via an ordered Bi-Bi reaction mechanism. It belongs to the phosphofructokinase B (PfkB) family of sugar kinases. Other members of this family (also known as the RK family) include ribokinase (RK), inosine-guanosine kinase, fructokinase, and 1-phosphofructokinase. The members of the PfkB/RK family are identified by the presence of three conserved sequence motifs. The structures of AdK and several other PfK family of proteins have been determined from a number of organisms (see section below) as well as that for RK protein from E. coli. Despite low sequence similarity between AdK and other PfkB family of proteins, these proteins are quite similar at structural levels. Compounds that are substrates for AdK include the N-nucleosides toyocamycin, tubercidin and 6-methylmecaptopurine riboside; the C-nucleosides formycin A, 9-azadenosine, and a large number of other C- and N-nucleoside analogs. The AdK from mammalian sources, in addition to carrying out ATP-dependent phosphorylation of Ado, also catalyzes an Ado-AMP exchange reaction requiring ADP. This activity is an integral part of AdK and it presumably allows a rapid and precise control of Ado concentration in cells. The enzymatic activity of AdK from different sources show a marked dependence on phosphate (Pi) and/or pentavalent ions and it is a conserved property of the PfkB family of proteins. The conserved NXXE motif, which is a distinctive property of the PfkB family of proteins, is involved in Pi (PVI) dependency.

=== Reaction catalysed ===
The enzyme converts adenosine to adenosine monophosphate by transferring a phosphate group. Adenosine diphosphate is produced as a byproduct:

adenosine triphosphate
+
adenosine
adenosine diphosphate
+
adenosine monophosphate

== Evolution and relationship to the PfkB family of proteins ==
The AdK gene/protein is mainly found in eukaryotic organisms and its primary sequence shows a high degree of conservation (>55% aa similarity). However, AdK sequences exhibit low (~ 20-25%), but significant similarity to other PfkB family of proteins such as RK and phosphofructokinases, which are also found in prokaryotic organisms. Although a protein exhibiting AdK activity has been reported in Mycobacterium tuberculosis, sequence and biochemical characteristics of this enzyme reveal it to be an atypical enzyme that is more closely related to ribokinase and fructokinase (35%) than to other ADKs (less than 24%).

== Gene and isoforms ==
The AdK gene in humans is located on chromosome 10 in the 10q11-10q24 region. In contrast to its coding sequence (about 1 Kb), the AdK gene in mammalian species is unusually large (~546 Kb in humans) and it consists of 11 exons (36 to 173 bp in length) and 10 introns whose lengths vary from 4.2 Kb to 128.6 Kb (average ~50Kb). The ratio of the non-coding to coding sequence for human ADK (>550) is the highest known for any gene. The AdK gene in mammalian organisms is also linked in a head to head manner to the gene for the long isoform of AdK to the gene for μ3A adaptor protein, and both these genes are transcribed from a single bi-directional promoter. The large size of the AdK gene and its linkage to the gene for μ3A adaptor protein are apparently unique characteristic of the amniotes (e.g. various mammals, birds, and reptiles). In contrast, the AdK genes in other eukaryotic organisms are much smaller in lengths (1.3 – 20 Kb long). In mammals, two isoforms of Adk are present. These two isoforms show no difference in their biological activity and they differ only at the N-terminus where the long isoform (AdK-long) contains extra 21 amino acids that replace the first 4 amino acids of the short isoform (AdK-short). These two isoforms are independently regulated at the transcriptional level and the promoter for the short isoform is located within the first large AdK intron. It was recently shown that of the two AdK isoforms, the AdK-long isoform is localized in the nucleus, whereas AdK-short is found in the cytoplasm. Both isoforms of the enzyme phosphorylate adenosine with identical kinetics and both require Mg^{2+} for activity.

== Cardio- and neuro-protective roles ==
AdK plays a central role in controlling the cellular levels of Ado, which via its interaction with adenosine receptors in mammalian tissues produces a broad range of physiological responses including potent cardioprotective and neuroprotective activities. The overexpression of AdK in the brain, which leads to decreased Ado levels and loss of inhibition of neuronal excitability by astrocytes, has been proposed as the main underlying cause of progression of epilepsy. Hence, the modulation of AdK by external means provides an important strategy for harnessing its potential therapeutic benefits. As such, there is much interest in developing specific inhibitors of AdK. Many AdK inhibitors, some of which show useful analgesic, anti-seizure, and anti-inflammatory properties in animal models have been described.

== Studies with mutant mammalian cells ==
In cultured mammalian cells, mainly Chinese hamster ovary (CHO) cells, many kinds of mutants that are affected in AdK and show interesting differences in their genetic and biochemical properties have been isolated; One kind of mutant that is obtained at unusually high spontaneous mutant frequency (10^{−3}-10^{−4}) contain large deletions within the AdK gene that leads to the loss of several introns and exons. Many mutants that are affected in the expression of either the expressions of the two AdK isoforms have also been isolated.

== Inhibitors ==
- A-286501
- ABT-702
- GP3269
