= Toyocamycin =

Chemical compound

Names
- IUPAC name 4-Amino-7-(β-D-ribofuranosyl)-7H-pyrrolo[2,3-d]pyrimidine-5-carbonitrile
- Other names: 7-Deaza-7-cyanoadenosine; Naritheracin; Siromycin; Toyokamycin; Unamycin B; Uramycin B; Vengicide

Identifiers
CAS Number	606-58-6
3D model (JSmol)	Interactive image
Beilstein Reference	4-26-00-01419
ChEBI	CHEBI:134606
ChEMBL	ChEMBL99668
ChemSpider	11331
DrugBank	DB13916
MeSH	Toyocamycin
PubChem CID	11824
UNII	L7995C4D7F
CompTox Dashboard (EPA)	801031395
- InChI: InChI=1S/C12H13N5O4/c13-1-5-2-17(11-7(5)10(14)15-4-16-11)12-9(20)8(19)6(3-18)21-12/h2,4,6,8-9,12,18-20H,3H2,(H2,14,15,16)/t6-,8-,9-,12-/m1/s1 Key: XOKJUSAYZUAMGJ-WOUKDFQISA-N
- SMILES: N#CC1CN([C@@H]2O[C@H](CO)[C@@H](O)[C@H]2O)C2NCNC(N)C12

Properties
Chemical formula	C_{12}H_{13}N_{5}O_{4}
Molar mass	291.267 g·mol^{−1}
Melting point	243 °C (469 °F; 516 K)
- Except where otherwise noted, data are given for materials in their standard state (at 25 °C [77 °F], 100 kPa). Infobox references

Toyocamycin is a naturally occurring nucleoside antibiotic analog of adenosine. It was first isolated from the bacterium Streptomyces toyocaensis. It has diverse biological activities including anticancer, antifungal, and antiviral properties. Besides S. toyocaensis, it is found in Streptomyces sparsogenes, Streptomyces diastatochromogenes, Streptomyces rimosus, and Tolypothrix tenuis.

== Structure ==
The chemical name of toyocamycin is 4-amino-7-(β-D-ribofuranosyl)-7H-pyrrolo[2,3-d]pyrimidine-5-carbonitrile. It is an N-glycosylpyrrolopyrimidine and a derivative of tubercidin, where the hydrogen at position 5 of the pyrrolopyrimidine ring is substituted with a nitrile group.

Toyocamycin closely resembles adenosine, except that the nitrogen at position 7 of the purine ring is replaced by a carbon atom, and a nitrile group (-C≡N) is attached at that position.

Tubercidin	Toyocamycin	Adenosine

Structural similarity of toyocamycin with tubercidin and adenosine

== Biological activity ==
Toyocamycin exhibits a broad spectrum of biological activities, making it an excellent interest in various research fields

=== Anticancer activity ===
Toyocamycin demonstrates cytotoxic effects on various cancer cell lines, including those of multiple myeloma, colon cancer, and pancreatic cancer. It works by triggering apoptosis in these cells. In the case of multiple myeloma, toyocamycin has shown enhanced effectiveness when used in combination with the proteasome inhibitor bortezomib, and it remains active even against cells that have become resistant to bortezomib. Studies in animal models of human multiple myeloma have further demonstrated that toyocamycin can suppress tumor growth in vivo.

=== Antifungal activity ===
Toyocamycin has strong antifungal properties. It shows effectiveness against a wide variety of fungal species, including plant pathogens and the human fungal pathogen Candida albicans. Because of this broad-spectrum activity, toyocamycin is considered a promising candidate for use in both agriculture and medicine.

=== Antiviral activity ===
Toyocamycin has demonstrated antiviral activity against several viruses, including fowl plague virus, murine oncornavirus (Friend virus), avian tumour virus, and human cytomegalovirus (HCMV). It has been shown to inhibit viral replication and reduce viral titers in infected cells.

=== Other biological activities ===
In addition to these activities, toyocamycin has been found to induce the translocation of nucleophosmin/B23 (NPM) from the nucleoli to the nucleoplasm in HeLa cells. It also inhibits phosphatidylinositol kinase, an enzyme involved in cell signaling. Furthermore, toyocamycin specifically disrupts auxin signaling in plants, thereby affecting their growth and development.

== Mechanism of action ==
Toyocamycin exerts its biological effects through multiple mechanisms, mainly due to its structural similarity to adenosine. This resemblance enables it to disrupt various adenosine-dependent cellular processes.

=== Inhibition of RNA Synthesis and Ribosome Function ===
Toyocamycin mimics adenosine and can be mistakenly incorporated into RNA during transcription, which disrupts or stops RNA production. There is also evidence that it can interfere with DNA synthesis. One of its key actions is blocking the processing of ribosomal RNA, especially the maturation of 28S and 18S rRNA. At lower doses, Toyocamycin slows down the processing of precursor rRNA, causing intermediate forms like 27S and 20S pre-rRNA to build up. At higher doses, it can completely stop the final processing steps, preventing the formation of mature 25S and 18S rRNA. This interference with ribosome production affects protein synthesis and can seriously reduce cell survival.

=== Inhibition of IRE1α-XBP1 Pathway ===
Toyocamycin is a strong blocker of XBP1 mRNA splicing, a key step in the unfolded protein response (UPR) that helps cells deal with stress in the endoplasmic reticulum. It stops XBP1 splicing triggered by common ER stressors like thapsigargin, tunicamycin, and 2-deoxyglucose, without interfering with other parts of the UPR, such as the ATF6 and PERK pathways. While it doesn't stop the phosphorylation of the IRE1α protein, it does prevent IRE1α from cutting XBP1 mRNA in lab experiments. This effect isn't limited to stress situations as toyocamycin also demonstrated blocking the constant activation of XBP1 seen in multiple myeloma cells and samples from patients.

=== Selective Inhibition of CDK9 ===
Toyocamycin has also been identified as a selective inhibitor of cyclin-dependent kinase 9 (CDK9), particularly in cancer cells. It demonstrates a strong inhibitory effect on CDK9, with an IC_{50} of 79 nM, while showing considerably weaker activity against other cyclin-dependent kinases such as CDK2, CDK4, CDK6, and CDK7. This selectivity results in reduced phosphorylation of RNA polymerase II, a key process regulated by CDK9 that is essential for gene transcription. Molecular docking studies suggest that toyocamycin fits tightly into CDK9's active site in a unique way compared to its interactions with other CDKs, which likely explains its specificity.

=== Inhibition of Rio1 kinase ===
Toyocamycin is known to inhibit Rio1 kinase, a key enzyme required for the proper processing and maturation of the 40S ribosomal subunit. Toyocamycin binds more strongly to Rio1 than its usual substrate, ATP and reduces the enzyme's activity, possibly by stabilizing a form of Rio1 that is less active in catalyzing reactions.

=== Interference with auxin signaling ===
In plants, toyocamycin specifically disrupts auxin signaling through the SCFTIR1 pathway. It prevents the activation of genes that typically respond to auxin and blocks the auxin-triggered breakdown of Aux/IAA repressor proteins. As a result, toyocamycin interferes with normal plant development, leading to noticeable effects such as reduced formation of lateral roots and epinastic growth of cotyledons in Arabidopsis thaliana.

=== Inhibition of phosphatidylinositol kinase ===
Toyocamycin has also been found to inhibit phosphatidylinositol kinase, an enzyme that plays a role in regulating cell growth and proliferation. Laboratory studies using the enzyme extracted from A431 cell membranes have shown that toyocamycin inhibits its activity with an IC_{50} value of 3.3 μg/mL.

=== Transport mechanism in Candida albicans ===
Toyocamycin shows selective toxicity against Candida albicans, mainly due to its efficient uptake by the fungus through a specific concentrative nucleoside transporter (CNT). In contrast, Saccharomyces cerevisiae is less affected because it lacks this transporter. When the CNT gene from C. albicans is introduced into S. cerevisiae, the yeast becomes sensitive to toyocamycin. Conversely, disrupting the CNT gene in C. albicans makes it resistant, hightlighting the role of this transporter in the drug's antifungal action.
