= Streptomyces sparsogenes =

Scientific classification
- Domain: Bacteria
- Kingdom: Bacillati
- Phylum: Actinomycetota
- Class: Actinomycetes
- Order: Streptomycetales
- Family: Streptomycetaceae
- Genus: Streptomyces
- Species: S. sparsogenes

Binomial name
- Streptomyces sparsogenes Owen et al. 1963

Type strain
- AS 4.1446, ATCC 25498, BCRC 12085, CBS 672.69, CBS 958.69, CCRC 12085, CGMCC 4.1446, CGMCC AS 4.1446, DSM 40356, IFO (now NBRC) 13086, IFO 13086, ISP 5356, JCM 4517, KCC S-0517, KCCS-0517, Lanoot R-8747, LMG 19378, LMG 5985, NBRC 13086, NCIB 9449, NCIMB 9449, NRRL 2940, NRRL B-2940, NRRL-ISP 5356, R-8747, RIA 1278, RIA 905, UC 2474, Upjohn Co. UC 2474, VKM Ac-1744, VKM Ac-1744.

Synonyms
- Streptomyces sparsogenes var. sparsognes

Species of bacterium

Streptomyces sparsogenes is a bacterium species from the genus of Streptomyces which has been isolated from soil. Streptomyces sparsogenes produces sparsomycine and tubercidin.

== See also ==
- List of Streptomyces species
