= Nucleic acid metabolism =

Process

Nucleic acid metabolism refers to the set of chemical reactions involved in the synthesis and degradation of nucleic acids (DNA and RNA). Nucleic acids are polymers (biopolymers) composed of monomers called nucleotides.

Nucleotide synthesis is an anabolic process that typically involves the chemical reaction of a phosphate group, a pentose sugar, and a nitrogenous base. In contrast, the degradation of nucleic acids is a catabolic process in which nucleotides or nucleobases are broken down, and their components can be salvaged to form new nucleotides.

Both synthesis and degradation reactions require multiple enzymes to facilitate these processes. Defects or deficiencies in these enzymes can lead to a variety of metabolic disorders.

Composition of nucleotides, which make up nucleic acids.

== Synthesis of nucleotides ==
Nucleotides are the monomers that polymerize to form nucleic acids. Each nucleotide consists of a sugar, a phosphate group, and a nitrogenous base. The nitrogenous bases found in nucleic acids belong to one of two categories: purines or pyrimidines.

In complex multicellular animals, both purines and pyrimidines are primarily synthesized in the liver, but they follow distinct biosynthetic pathways. However, all nucleotide synthesis requires phosphoribosyl pyrophosphate (PRPP), which donates the ribose and phosphate needed to form a nucleotide.

=== Purine synthesis ===
The origin of atoms that make up purine bases.

Adenine and guanine are the two nitrogenous bases classified as purines. In purine synthesis, phosphoribosyl pyrophosphate (PRPP) is converted into inosine monophosphate (IMP). The production of IMP from PRPP requires glutamine, glycine, aspartate, and six molecules of adenosine triphosphate (ATP), among other components.

IMP serves as a precursor for both adenosine monophosphate (AMP) and guanosine monophosphate (GMP). AMP is synthesized from IMP using guanosine triphosphate (GTP) and aspartate, with aspartate being converted into fumarate. In contrast, the synthesis of GMP requires an intermediate step: IMP is first oxidized by NAD⁺ to form xanthosine monophosphate (XMP), which is subsequently converted into GMP via the hydrolysis of one ATP molecule and the conversion of glutamine to glutamate.

Both AMP and GMP can be phosphorylated by kinases to form adenosine triphosphate (ATP) and guanosine triphosphate (GTP), respectively. ATP stimulates the production of GTP, while GTP stimulates the production of ATP. This cross-regulation maintains a balanced ratio of ATP and GTP, preventing an excess of either nucleotide, which could increase the risk of DNA replication errors and purine misincorporation.

Lesch–Nyhan syndrome is caused by a deficiency of hypoxanthine-guanine phosphoribosyltransferase (HGPRT), an enzyme that catalyzes the salvage of guanine to GMP. This X-linked congenital disorder leads to the overproduction of uric acid and is associated with neurological symptoms, including intellectual disability, spasticity, and compulsive self-mutilation.

=== Pyrimidine synthesis ===
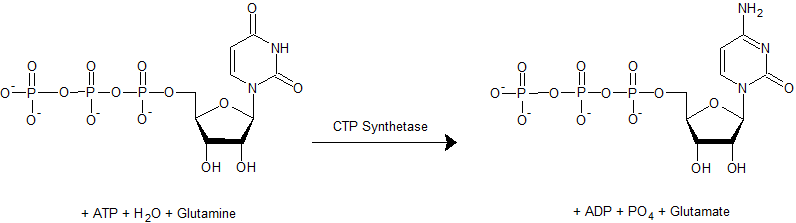
Uridine-triphosphate (UTP), at left, reacts with glutamine and other molecules to form cytidine-triphosphate (CTP), on the right.

Pyrimidine nucleosides include cytidine, uridine, and thymidine.

The synthesis of pyrimidine nucleotides begins with the formation of uridine monophosphate (UMP). This process requires aspartate, glutamine, bicarbonate, and two molecules of ATP to provide energy. Additionally, phosphoribosyl pyrophosphate (PRPP) provides the ribose-phosphate backbone. Unlike purine synthesis, in which the nitrogenous base is built upon PRPP, pyrimidine synthesis forms the base first and attaches it to PRPP later in the process.

Once UMP is synthesized, it undergoes phosphorylation using ATP to form uridine-triphosphate (UTP). UTP can then be converted into cytidine-triphosphate (CTP) in a reaction catalyzed by CTP synthetase, which utilizes glutamine as an amine donor.

The synthesis of thymidine nucleotides requires the reduction of UMP to deoxyuridine monophosphate (dUMP) via ribonucleotide reductase (see next section). dUMP is then methylated by thymidylate synthase to produce thymidine monophosphate (TMP).

The regulation of pyrimidine synthesis is tightly controlled. ATP, a purine nucleotide, activates pyrimidine synthesis, while CTP, a pyrimidine nucleotide, acts as an inhibitor. This regulatory feedback ensures balanced purine and pyrimidine levels, which is essential for DNA and RNA synthesis.

Deficiencies in enzymes involved in pyrimidine synthesis can lead to metabolic disorders such as orotic aciduria. This genetic disorder is characterized by excessive excretion of orotic acid in urine due to defects in the enzyme UMP synthase, which is responsible for the conversion of orotic acid into UMP.

=== Converting nucleotides to deoxynucleotides ===
Nucleotides are initially synthesized with ribose as the sugar component, a characteristic feature of RNA. However, DNA requires deoxyribose, which lacks the 2'-hydroxyl (-OH) group on the ribose. The removal of this -OH group is catalyzed by ribonucleotide reductase, an enzyme that converts nucleoside diphosphates (NDPs) into their deoxy forms, deoxynucleoside diphosphates (dNDPs). The nucleotides must be in the diphosphate form for this reaction to occur.

To synthesize thymidine, a DNA-specific nucleotide that exists only in the deoxy form, uridine is first converted into deoxyuridine by ribonucleotide reductase. Deoxyuridine is then methylated by thymidylate synthase to produce thymidine.

== Degradation of nucleic acids ==
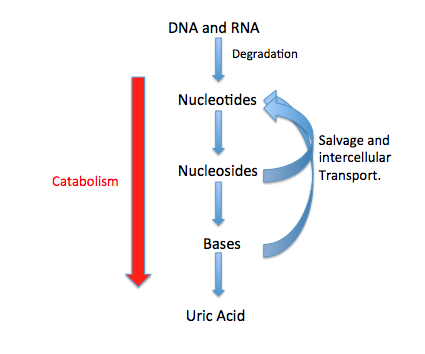
General outline of nucleic acid degradation for purines.

The breakdown of DNA and RNA occurs continuously within the cell. Purine and pyrimidine nucleosides can either be degraded into waste products for excretion or salvaged for reuse as nucleotide components.

=== Pyrimidine catabolism ===
Cytosine and uracil are converted into beta-alanine, which is further processed into malonyl-CoA, a key precursor for fatty acid synthesis and other metabolic pathways. Thymine, on the other hand, is converted into β-aminoisobutyric acid, which is then used to form methylmalonyl-CoA. The remaining carbon skeletons, such as acetyl-CoA and succinyl-CoA, can be further oxidized in the citric acid cycle. Pyrimidine degradation ultimately results in the formation of ammonium, water, and carbon dioxide. The ammonium can then enter the urea cycle, which takes place in both the cytosol and mitochondria of cells.

Pyrimidine bases can also be salvaged. For example, the uracil base can be combined with ribose-1-phosphate to form uridine monophosphate (UMP). A similar reaction occurs with thymine and deoxyribose-1-phosphate.

Deficiencies in enzymes involved in pyrimidine catabolism can lead to diseases such as Dihydropyrimidine dehydrogenase deficiency, which causes neurological impairments.

=== Purine catabolism ===
Purine degradation primarily occurs in the liver in humans and requires a series of enzymes to break down purines into uric acid. First, nucleotides lose their phosphate groups through the action of 5'-nucleotidase. The purine nucleoside adenosine is then deaminated by adenosine deaminase and hydrolyzed by a nucleosidase to form hypoxanthine. Hypoxanthine is subsequently oxidized to xanthine and then to uric acid via the enzyme xanthine oxidase.

The other purine nucleoside, guanosine, is cleaved to form guanine. Guanine is then deaminated by guanine deaminase to produce xanthine, which is further converted to uric acid. In both degradation pathways, oxygen serves as the final electron acceptor. The excretion of uric acid varies among different animals.

Free purine and pyrimidine bases released within the cell are often transported across membranes and salvaged through the nucleotide salvage pathway to regenerate nucleotides. For example, adenine combines with phosphoribosyl pyrophosphate (PRPP) to form adenosine monophosphate (AMP) and pyrophosphate (PPi) in a reaction catalyzed by adenine phosphoribosyltransferase. Similarly, free guanine is salvaged via a reaction requiring hypoxanthine-guanine phosphoribosyltransferase (HGPRT).

Defects in purine catabolism can lead to various diseases, including gout, which results from the accumulation of uric acid crystals in joints, and adenosine deaminase deficiency, which causes immunodeficiency.

== Interconversion of nucleotides ==
Once nucleotides are synthesized, they can exchange phosphate groups to form nucleoside mono-, di-, and triphosphates. The conversion of a nucleoside diphosphate (NDP) to a nucleoside triphosphate (NTP) is catalyzed by nucleoside diphosphate kinase, which utilizes ATP as the phosphate donor. Similarly, nucleoside monophosphate kinase facilitates the phosphorylation of nucleoside monophosphates to their diphosphate forms.

Additionally, adenylate kinase plays a crucial role in regulating cellular energy balance by catalyzing the interconversion of two molecules of ADP into ATP and AMP (2 ADP ⇔ ATP + AMP).

== See also ==
- Carbohydrate metabolism
- DNA
- Nucleic acid
- Protein metabolism
- Purine nucleotide cycle
- RNA
