= Autonomous Design Group =

Anti-capitalist art collective

- Abbreviation: ADG
- Formation: 2019; 7 years ago
- Website: weareadg.org

Autonomous Design Group (ADG) is an anonymous anti-capitalist, anti-authoritarian art collective founded in the United Kingdom in 2019. The group produces political artwork for posters and stickers as well as use online. The group publishes their work in an editable open-source format using a Creative Commons NonCommercial license.
