= ADK (automobile) =

Belgian automobile manufactured 1922–1930

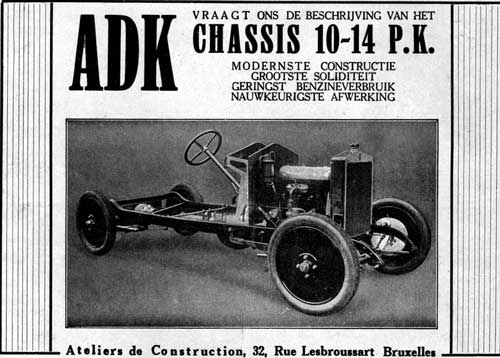
Advertisement (September 1923)

The ADK was a Belgian automobile manufactured between 1922 and 1930 by Automobiles de Kuyper SA of Anderlecht, Brussels. The company was founded in 1922 by Robert De Kuyper. The company did not make their own engines, these were always bought from other manufacturers.

The first car, the 10CV Type Y-22 used a four-cylinder S.C.A.P. engine. Over the next few years a variety of other 4-cylinder cars were made.

In 1927 (at the Brussels Motor Show) the company announced a 1594 cc pushrod ohv six-cylinder with twin carburettors, as well as in-unit engine/gearbox construction. A straight-8 model was announced in 1928 with a 2340 cc capacity again by S.C.A.P.

The company finally closed in 1931.
