= Lenawee County Airport =

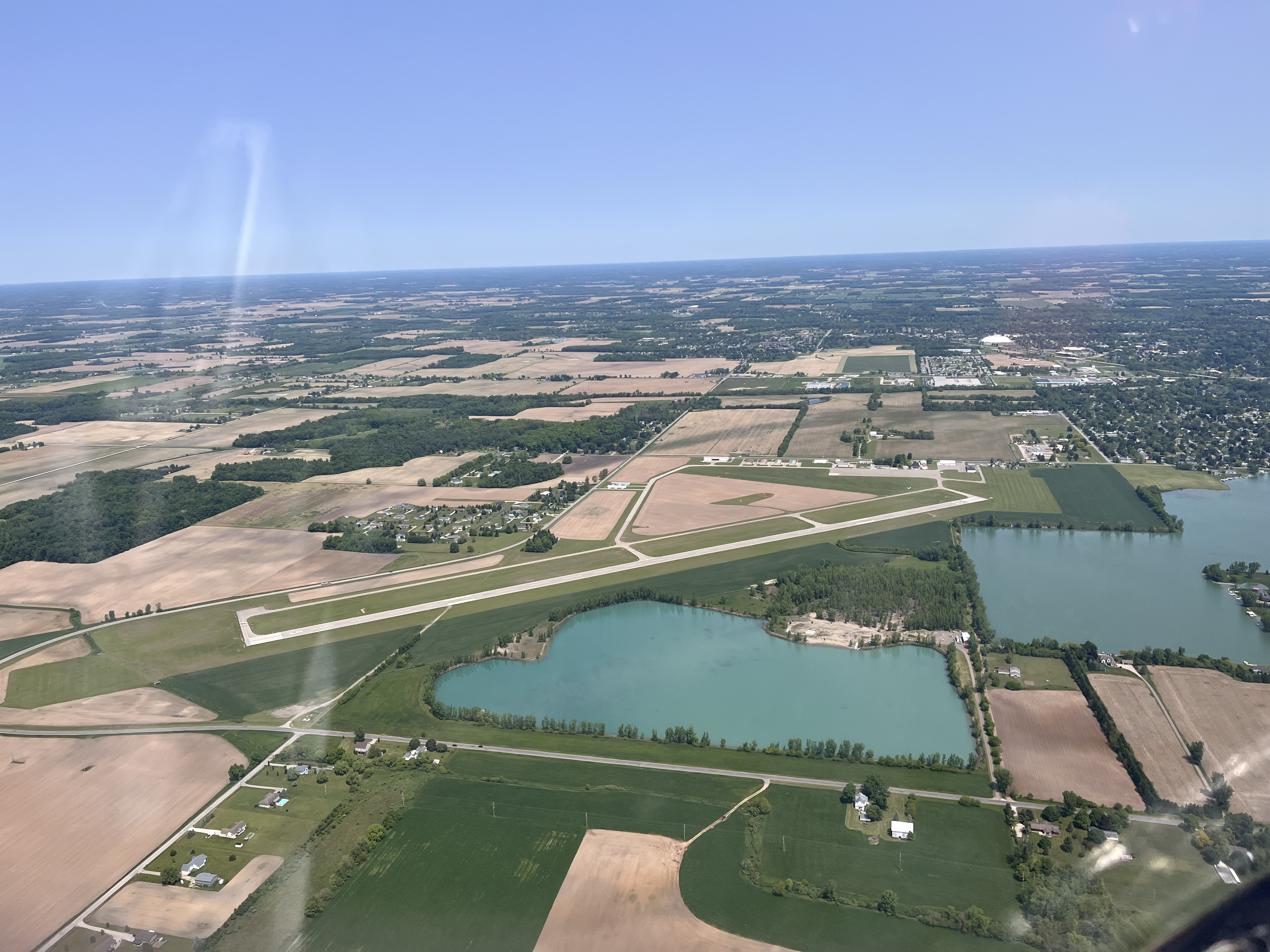
- Overhead view
- IATA: ADG; ICAO: KADG; FAA LID: ADG

Summary
- Airport type: Public
- Owner: Lenawee County
- Location: Adrian, Michigan
- Elevation AMSL: 798 ft (243 m)
- Coordinates: 41°52′04″N 084°04′38″W
- Website: http://www.lenawee.mi.us/425/Airport

Map
- Location of airport in Michigan ADG (the United States)

Runways
Direction	Length		Surface
Direction	ft	m	Surface
05/23	5,001	1,524	Asphalt
11/29	1,810	552	Turf

Statistics (2021)
- Aircraft operations: 18,000
- Based aircraft: 57
- Source: Federal Aviation Administration

Lenawee County Airport (IATA: ADG, ICAO: KADG, FAA LID: ADG) is a county-owned public-use airport located three miles (5 km) southwest of the central business district of Adrian, a city in Lenawee County, Michigan, United States. The airport is accessible by road from Cadmus Road, and is close to US-223. It is included in the Federal Aviation Administration (FAA) National Plan of Integrated Airport Systems for 2017–2021, in which it is categorized as a local general aviation facility.

The Lenawee County Airport is the closest airport to Michigan International Speedway, the Irish Hills, and Michigan State University's Hidden Lake Gardens. Siena Heights University, Adrian College, and Jackson Community College Lenawee Campus are also just a few miles away. LCA's arrival and departure process is centrally located between Ann Arbor and Jackson, Michigan, and Toledo, Ohio. The airport is staffed between 8am and dusk.

The airport is home to a chapter of the Civil Air Patrol, which, besides its duties to the U.S. Air Force, hosts community events for locals interested in aviation.

== History ==
The runway was in the process of being extended by 1,500 feet (460 m) in early October 2001.

== Facilities and aircraft ==
Lenawee County Airport covers an area of 248 acres (1.00 km^{2}) which contains two runways: 05/23 has an asphalt pavement measuring 5,001 x 100 ft. (1,524 x 30 m) and 11/29 has a turf surface measuring 1,810 x 150 ft. (552 x 46 m).

The airport received a federal grant in 2021 to rebuild its main runways and taxiways, especially repaving it and widening the turns to allow larger aircraft to use the airport. The runways haven't been redone since 2005. The taxiway's repaving began in the summer of 2021 and was finished mid-fall, while the runway expected to receive work in the spring of 2022.

The airport received additional funding in 2022 as part of the Infrastructure Investment and Jobs Act signed by President Joe Biden.

For the 12-month period ending December 31, 2021, the airport had 18,000 aircraft operations per year, an average of 49 per day, composed entirely of general aviation. For the same time period, there were 57 aircraft based at the airport: 42 single-engine and 2 multi-engine airplanes, 11 gliders, 1 jet, and 1 helicopter.

The airport has a fixed-base operator offering fuel, general maintenance, courtesy transportation, conference rooms, a crew lounge, snooze rooms, and more.

== Accidents & Incidents ==
- On December 10, 1985, an Aerospatiale SA365N crashed near the airport.
- On November 2, 1996, a Frost RAF 2000 GTX SE impacted terrain following contact between the main rotor system, the pusher propeller and other portions of the airframe two miles southeast of the airport. The probable cause of the accident was found to be the student pilot's failure to maintain control of the aircraft; contributing was his lack of familiarity with the aircraft.
- On April 26, 2009, a LET L-23 Super Blanik glider crashed during a training flight at Lenawee County Airport. The instructor aboard was attempting to demonstrate a slip to the student when the aircraft encountered a strong, gusting crosswind, making control difficult. The aircraft landed in grass north of the runway. The probable cause of the accident was the flight instructor's inadequate compensation for the strong, gusting crosswind during landing. Contributing was the flight instructor's attempted flight with known adverse weather near the airport.
- On October 23, 2009, a Rockwell Commander impacted terrain following a loss of control near the Lenawee County Airport. The pilot failed to maintain control of the aircraft due to spatial disorientation while on an instrument approach while in instrument meteorological conditions. The aircraft was consumed by a post-impact fire, and both aboard received fatal injuries.
- On December 6, 2012, an Lsa America Inc Allegro impacted terrain while attempting a go-around at the Lenawee County Airport. While performing touch-and-go landings, the student onboard failed to maintain alignment with the runway centerline, and the instructor directed a go-around 30 feet above the runway. The student used excessive left rudder input during the subsequent go-around maneuver, and the instructor was unable to retain full control of the aircraft. The probable cause of the accident was found to be the student pilot's improper flight control input during a go-around and his interference with the flight instructor's attempted remedial actions.
- On August 11, 2017, a Navion Navion G crashed near the airport. The accident went undetected for two hours until a survivor found a road and got help. Engine trouble is suspected as the cause of the crash. It was found there was a leak in the gascolator, which allowed air to enter the fuel system and resulted in a partial loss of engine power.
- On January 13, 2019, a Piper PA-32 Cherokee Six struck an airport fence at Lenawee County Airport after an engine failure on approach to the airport. The aircraft was just out of maintenance inspections.

== See also ==
- List of airports in Michigan
