= Adg =

Adg ادگ
- Village
- Location within Iran
- Coordinates: 36°11′00″N 58°55′09″E
- Country: Iran
- Province: Razavi Khorasan
- County: Nishapur
- Bakhsh: Central
- Rural District: Fazl

Population (2006)
  - Total: 457
- Time zone: UTC+3:30 (IRST)
  - Summer (DST): UTC+4:30 (IRDT)

Adg (Persian: ادگ, also Romanized as Adk) is a village in Fazl Rural District, in the Central District of Nishapur County, Razavi Khorasan Province, Iran. At the 2006 census, its population was 457, in 134 families.

== See also ==
- List of cities, towns and villages in Razavi Khorasan Province
