= CTPS =

CTPS may refer to:

- The enzyme CTP synthase, or either of the two CTPS genes:
  - CTPS (1p34.1)
  - CTPS2 (Xp22)
