= UPB1 =

Protein-coding gene in the species Homo sapiens

Identifiers
- Aliases: UPB1, BUP1, beta-ureidopropionase 1
- External IDs: OMIM: 606673; MGI: 2143535; HomoloGene: 9471; GeneCards: UPB1; OMA:UPB1 - orthologs

Gene location (Human)
Chr.	Chromosome 22 (human)
Band	22q11.23	Start	24,494,107 bp
Band	22q11.23	End	24,528,390 bp

Gene location (Mouse)
Chr.	Chromosome 10 (mouse)
Band	10|10 C1	Start	75,236,949 bp
Band	10|10 C1	End	75,277,513 bp
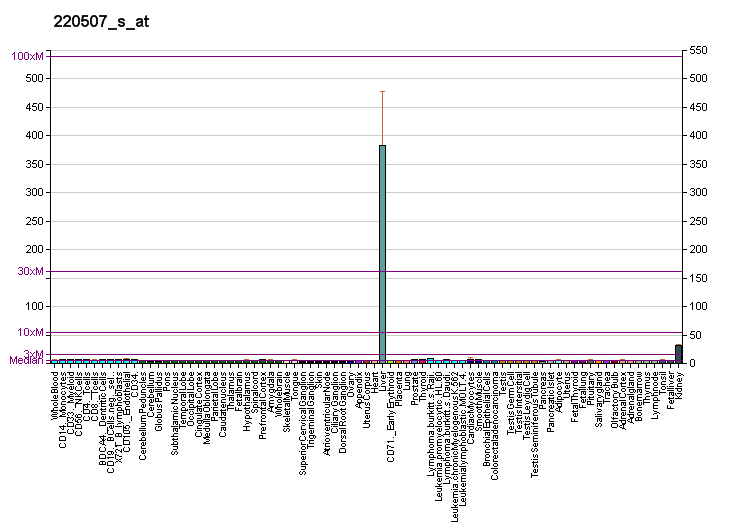
RNA expression pattern
Bgee	Human / Mouse (ortholog); Top expressed in: right lobe of liver; kidney tubule; glomerulus; metanephric glomerulus; oocyte; jejunal mucosa; human kidney; testicle; renal medulla; cerebellar vermis / Top expressed in: left lobe of liver; human kidney; right kidney; proximal tubule; lacrimal gland; islet of Langerhans; seminal vesicula; olfactory epithelium; parotid gland; fetal liver hematopoietic progenitor cell; More reference expression data
BioGPS	More reference expression data
Gene ontology
Molecular function	beta-ureidopropionase activity; catalytic activity; hydrolase activity; hydrolase activity, acting on carbon-nitrogen (but not peptide) bonds; metal ion binding
Cellular component	cytoplasm; cytosol; extracellular exosome
Biological process	beta-alanine biosynthetic process; metabolism; nitrogen compound metabolic process; pyrimidine nucleoside catabolic process
Sources:Amigo / QuickGO
Orthologs
Species	Human	Mouse
Entrez	51733	103149
Ensembl	ENSG00000100024	ENSMUSG00000033427
UniProt	Q9UBR1	Q8VC97
RefSeq (mRNA)	NM_016327	NM_133995
RefSeq (protein)	NP_057411	NP_598756
Location (UCSC)	Chr 22: 24.49 – 24.53 Mb	Chr 10: 75.24 – 75.28 Mb
PubMed search
- Wikidata
View/Edit Human	View/Edit Mouse

Beta-ureidopropionase is an enzyme that in humans is encoded by the UPB1 gene.

This gene encodes a protein that belongs to the CN hydrolase family. Beta-ureidopropionase catalyzes the last step in the pyrimidine degradation pathway. The pyrimidine bases uracil and thymine are degraded via the consecutive action of dihydropyrimidine dehydrogenase (DHPDH), dihydropyrimidinase (DHP) and beta-ureidopropionase (UP) to beta-alanine and beta-aminoisobutyric acid, respectively. UP deficiencies are associated with N-carbamyl-beta-amino aciduria and may lead to abnormalities in neurological activity.

== Interactive pathway map ==
Click on genes, proteins and metabolites below to link to respective articles. (Note: The interactive pathway map can be edited at WikiPathways: "FluoropyrimidineActivity_WP1601".)

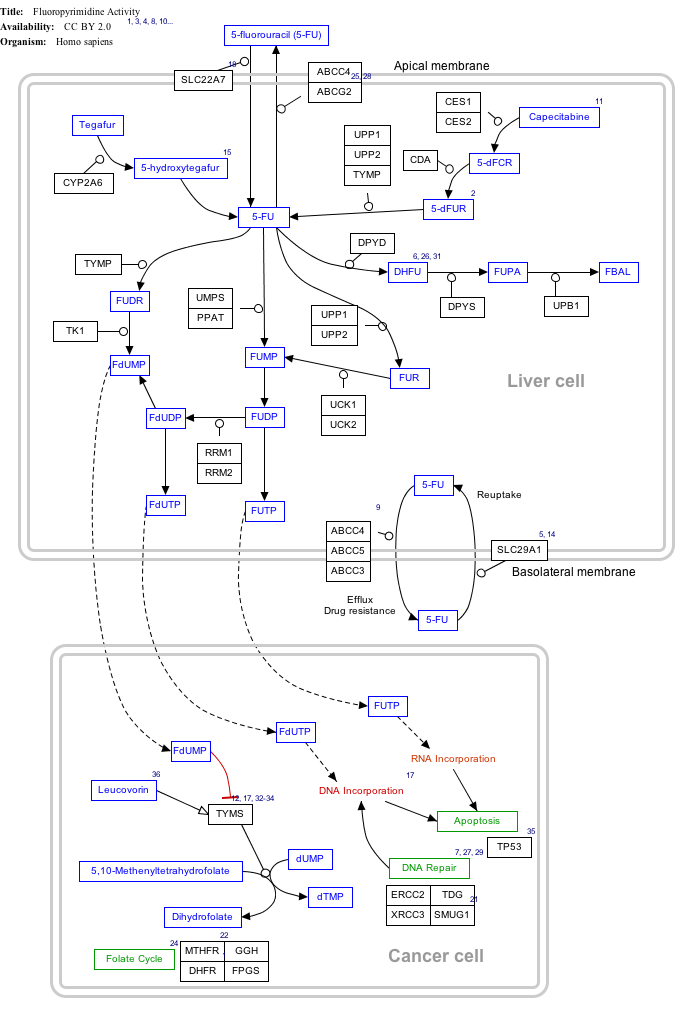

Fluorouracil (5-FU) Activity edit
