= N-acylneuraminate cytidylyltransferase =

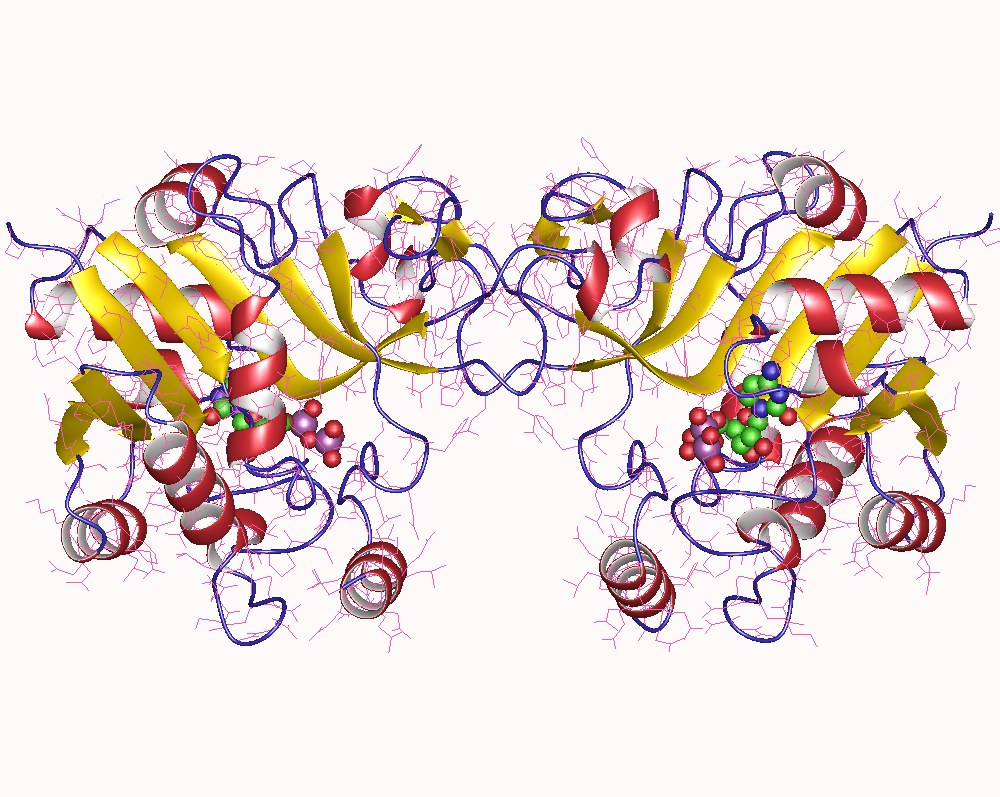
- N-acylneuraminate cytidylyltransferase dimer, Neisseria meningitidis

Identifiers
- EC no.: 2.7.7.43
- CAS no.: 9067-82-7

Databases
- IntEnz: IntEnz view
- BRENDA: BRENDA entry
- ExPASy: NiceZyme view
- KEGG: KEGG entry
- MetaCyc: metabolic pathway
- PRIAM: profile
- PDB structures: RCSB PDB PDBe PDBsum
- Gene Ontology: AmiGO / QuickGO
Search
- PMC: articles
- PubMed: articles
- NCBI: proteins

In enzymology, a N-acylneuraminate cytidylyltransferase (EC 2.7.7.43) is an enzyme that catalyzes the chemical reaction

CTP + N-acylneuraminate $\rightleftharpoons$ diphosphate + CMP-N-acylneuraminate

Thus, the two substrates of this enzyme are CTP and N-acylneuraminate, whereas its two products are diphosphate and CMP-N-acylneuraminate.

This enzyme belongs to the family of transferases, specifically those transferring phosphorus-containing nucleotide groups (nucleotidyltransferases). The systematic name of this enzyme class is CTP:N-acylneuraminate cytidylyltransferase. Other names in common use include CMP-sialate pyrophosphorylase, CMP-sialate synthase, cytidine 5'-monophosphosialic acid synthetase, CMP-Neu5Ac synthetase, CMP-NeuAc synthetase, acylneuraminate cytidyltransferase, CMP-N-acetylneuraminate synthetase, CMP-N-acetylneuraminate synthase, CMP-N-acetylneuraminic acid synthase, CMP-NANA synthetase, CMP-sialate synthetase, CMP-sialic synthetase, cytidine 5'-monophospho-N-acetylneuraminic acid synthetase, cytidine 5-monophosphate N-acetylneuraminic acid synthetase, cytidine monophosphosialic acid synthetase, cytidine monophosphoacetylneuraminic synthetase, cytidine monophosphosialate pyrophosphorylase, cytidine monophosphosialate synthetase, and acetylneuraminate cytidylyltransferase. This enzyme participates in aminosugars metabolism.

== Structural studies ==
As of late 2007, three structures have been solved for this class of enzymes, with PDB accession codes 1EYR, 1EZI, and 1QWJ.
