= CTP synthetase =

Enzyme

CTP synthase
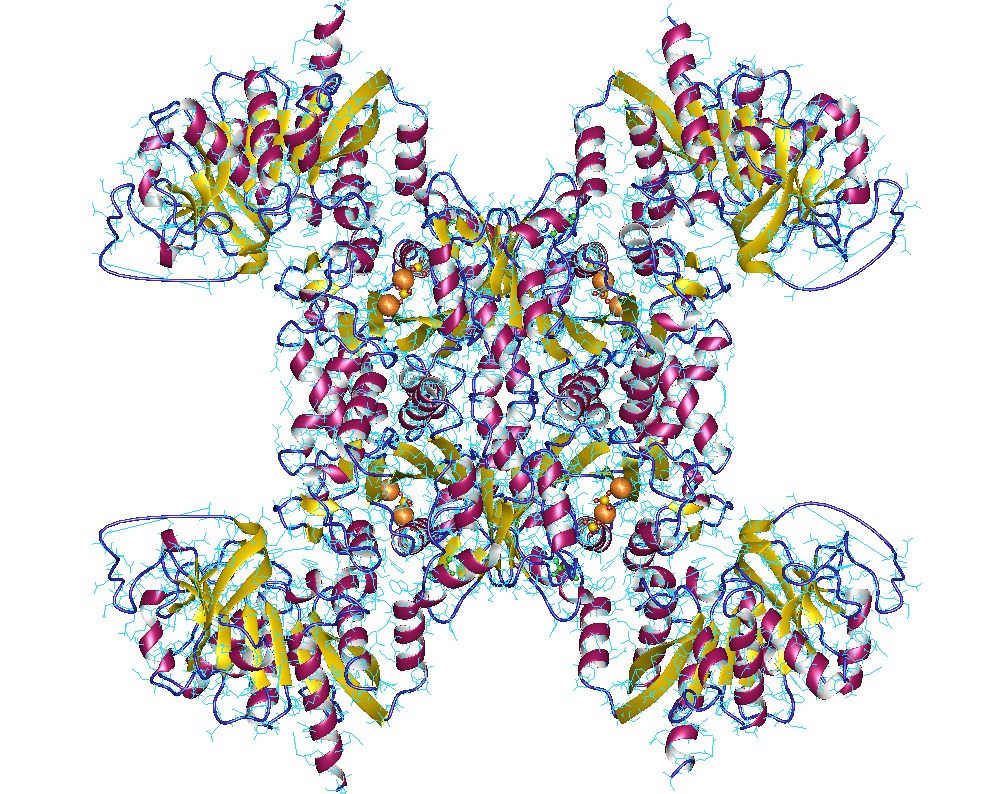

Identifiers
- EC no.: 6.3.4.2
- CAS no.: 9023-56-7

Databases
- BRENDA: enzyme data
- ExPASy: NiceZyme view
- KEGG: enzyme entry
- MetaCyc: metabolic pathway
- Rhea: reactions
- PDB structures: RCSB PDB PDBe PDBsum
- Gene Ontology: AmiGO / QuickGO
Search
- PMC: articles
- PubMed: articles
- NCBI: proteins

CTP synthase is an enzyme (EC 6.3.4.2) involved in pyrimidine biosynthesis that interconverts UTP and CTP.

== Reaction mechanism ==
CTP (cytidine triphosphate) synthetase catalyzes the last committed step in pyrimidine nucleotide biosynthesis:

ATP + UTP + glutamine → ADP + P_{i} + CTP + glutamate

It is the rate-limiting enzyme for the synthesis of cytosine nucleotides from both the de novo and uridine salvage pathways.

The reaction proceeds by the ATP-dependent phosphorylation of UTP on the 4-oxygen atom, making the 4-carbon electrophilic and vulnerable to reaction with ammonia. The source of the amino group in CTP is glutamine, which is hydrolysed in a glutamine amidotransferase domain to produce ammonia. This is then channeled through the interior of the enzyme to the synthetase domain. Here, ammonia reacts with the intermediate 4-phosphoryl UTP.

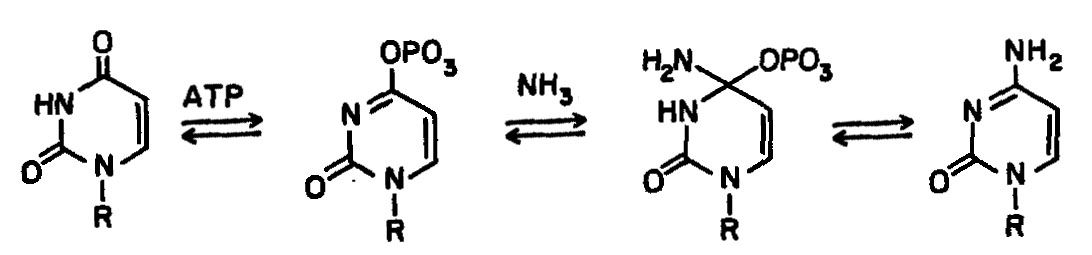

== Isozymes ==
Two isozymes with CTP synthase activity exist in humans, encoded by the following genes:

- CTPS – CTP synthase 1
- CTPS2 – CTP synthase 2

== Structure ==
Dimeric form of CTP synthase from Sulfolobus solfataricus (PDB code: 3NVA). Chain A is depicted in blue and Chain B in green.

Active CTP synthase exists as a homotetrameric enzyme. At low enzyme concentrations and in the absence of ATP and UTP, CTP synthase exists as inactive monomer. As enzyme concentration increases, it polymerizes first to a dimer (such as the form shown to the left) and, in the presence of ATP and UTP, forms a tetramer.

The enzyme contains two major domains, responsible for the aminotransferase and synthase activity, respectively. The amidotransferase domains are located away from the tetramer interfaces and are not affected by the oligomeric state. The ATP-binding site and CTP-binding site in the synthase domain are located at the tetramer interface. It is for this reason that ATP and UTP are required for tetramerization.

== Regulation ==
CTP synthase is precisely regulated by the intracellular concentrations of CTP and UTP, and both hCTPS1 and hCTPS2 have been seen to be maximally active at physiological concentrations of ATP, GTP, and glutamine.

The activity of human CTPS1 isozyme has been demonstrated to be inhibited by phosphorylation. One major example of this is phosphorylation of the Ser-571 residue by glycogen synthase kinase 3 (GSK3) in response to low serum conditions. Additionally, Ser568 has been seen to be phosphorylated by casein kinase 1, inhibiting CTP synthase activity.

CTP is also subject to various forms of allosteric regulation. GTP acts as an allosteric activator that strongly promotes the hydrolysis of glutamine, but is also inhibiting to glutamine-dependent CTP formation at high concentrations. This acts to balance the relative amounts of purine and pyrimidine nucleotides. The reaction product CTP also serves as an allosteric inhibitor. The triphosphate binding site overlaps with that of UTP, but the nucleoside moiety of CTP binds in an alternative pocket opposite the binding site for UTP.

CTP synthase levels have been shown to be dependent on levels of the transcription factor Myc. In turn, CTP synthase activity is required for Myc related phenotypes.

The glutamine analog DON has also been seen to act as an irreversible inhibitor, and has been used as an anti-cancer agent.

== Filaments ==
CTP synthase has been reported to form filaments in several different organisms. These include bacteria (C. crescentus), yeast (S. cerevisiae), fruit flies (D. melanogaster) and human cells. These filamentous structures have been referred to as cytoplasmic rods and rings, cytoophidia (from the Greek "cyto" meaning cell and "ophidium" meaning serpent, due to the structures morphology) or simply CTP synthase filaments. It has been shown that filamentation downregulates or upregulates CTP synthase activity depending on the species. In Drosophila, only one of the CTP synthase isoform forms the filament. Since the discovery of this novel mode of enzyme regulation in CTP synthase, multiple other enzymes have been shown to exhibit similar characteristics, suggesting that this is an important and well conserved strategy for enzymatic regulation. CTP synthase remains a model enzyme for the study of filament formation.

== Clinical significance ==
Upregulated CTP synthase activity has been widely seen in human and rodent tumors. Evidence from fly models and human cancer cells suggests that Myc-dependent cell growth may be more susceptible to suppression of CTP-synthase activity.

Mutations in the CTP synthase have been seen to confer resistance to cytotoxic drugs such as cytosine arabinoside (ara-C) in a Chinese hamster ovary (CHO) cell model of leukemia though such mutations were not found in human patients with ara-C resistance.

== See also ==
- Pyrimidine biosynthesis
