= C5orf46 =

Protein-coding gene in the species Homo sapiens

Identifiers
- Aliases: C5orf46, SSSP1, chromosome 5 open reading frame 46, AP-64
- External IDs: MGI: 2684940; GeneCards: C5orf46

Gene location (Human)
| Chr. | Chromosome 5 (human) |
| Band | 5q32 | Start | 147,880,726 bp |
| Band | 5q32 | End | 147,906,538 bp |

Gene location (Mouse)
| Chr. | Chromosome 18 (mouse) |
| Band | 18|18 B3 | Start | 43,910,261 bp |
| Band | 18|18 B3 | End | 43,925,943 bp |
RNA expression pattern
| Bgee | Human / Mouse (ortholog); Top expressed in: testicle; skin of thigh; human penis; skin of abdomen; ascending aorta; skin of hip; vulva; parotid gland; nipple; Descending thoracic aorta / Top expressed in: esophagus; lip; skin of abdomen; skin of external ear; skin of back; umbilical cord; epidermis; hair follicle; stomach; thymus; More reference expression data |
| BioGPS | n/a |
Gene ontology
| Molecular function | molecular function |
| Cellular component | extracellular exosome; extracellular region |
| Biological process | biological process |
Sources:Amigo / QuickGO
Orthologs
| Databases | NCBI: entry; OMA: entry |
| Species | Human | Mouse |
| Entrez | 389336 | 225443 |
| Ensembl | ENSG00000178776 | ENSMUSG00000071858 |
| UniProt | Q6UWT4 | Q3V2D2 |
| RefSeq (mRNA) | NM_206966 | NM_001033280 |
| RefSeq (protein) | NP_996849 | NP_001028452 |
| Location (UCSC) | Chr 5: 147.88 – 147.91 Mb | Chr 18: 43.91 – 43.93 Mb |
| PubMed search |
- Wikidata
| View/Edit Human | View/Edit Mouse |

C5orf46 is a protein coding gene located on chromosome 5 in humans. It is also known as sssp1, or skin and saliva secreted protein 1. There are two known isoforms known in humans, with isoform 2 (analyzed throughout this page) being the longer of the two. The protein encoded is predicted to have one transmembrane domain, and has a predicted molecular weight of 9,692 Da, and a basal isoelectric point of 4.67.

== Gene ==
Found on the minus strand of chromosome 5, the c5orf46 isoform X2 is 4679 nucleotides in length and has 4 exons.

=== Evolution and orthologs ===
C5orf46 orthologs are only found in Chordata, with the earliest instance being found in the Ornithorhynchus anatinus around 177 million years ago. Highly conserved regions include the signal peptide sequence found towards the N-terminus of the protein. There are no paralogs found in humans.

Table 1: C5orf46 Orthologs
| Genus/Species | Organism Common Name | Order | Accession number | Length (amino acids) | Sequence Identity with Human | Sequence Similarity with Human |
|---|---|---|---|---|---|---|
| Homo sapiens | Human | Primates | XP_005268503.2 | 102 | 100 | 100 |
| Pan paniscus | Bonobo | Primates | XP_003829110.1 | 87 | 98 | 98 |
| Octodon degus | Common degu | Rodentia | XP_004631400.1 | 73 | 68 | 82 |
| Mus musculus | House mouse | Rodentia | NP_001028452.1 | 93 | 68 | 77 |
| Urocitellus parryii | Arctic ground squirrel | Rodentia | XP_026240295.1 | 92 | 59 | 72 |
| Leptonychotes weddelli | Weddell seal | Carnivora | XP_006732700.1 | 124 | 78 | 94 |
| Acinonyx jubatus | Cheetah | Carnivora | XP_026897868.1 | 147 | 76 | 87 |
| Zalophus californianus | California sea lion | Carnivora | XP_027462230.1 | 84 | 75 | 86 |
| Sorex araneus | Common shrew | Eulipotyphla | XP_004618219.1 | 73 | 74 | 79 |
| Vicugna pacos | Alpaca | Artiodactyla | XP_006204536.1 | 88 | 73 | 81 |
| Delphinapertus leucas | Beluga whale | Artiodactyla | XP_030618631.1 | 88 | 73 | 81 |
| Camelus bactrianus | Bactrian camel | Artiodactyla | XP_010954370.1 | 83 | 73 | 79 |
| Orcinus orca | Killer Whale | Artiodactyla | XP_004280428.1 | 88 | 71 | 83 |
| Sus scrofa | Wild boar | Artiodactyla | XP_003354397.2 | 90 | 67 | 82 |
| Manis javanica | Seunda pangolin | Pholidota | XP_017496222.1 | 155 | 62 | 79 |
| Myotis davidii | Bat | Chiroptera | XP_015428095.1 | 104 | 41 | 50 |
| Elephantulus edwardii | Cape elephant shrew | Macroscelidea | XP_006893786.1 | 76 | 78 | 80 |
| Dasypus novemcinctus | Nine-banded armadillo | Cingulata | XP_004447160.1 | 88 | 72 | 82 |
| Vombatus urinus | Common wombat | Diprotodontia | XP_027697780.1 | 78 | 45 | 62 |
| Phascolarctos cinereus | Koala | Diprotodontia | XP_020854530.1 | 78 | 44 | 62 |
| Ornithorhynchus anatinus | Platypus | Monotremata | XP_028912384.1 | 80 | 43 | 61 |

=== Promoters ===
A Genomatix ElDorado promoter database search predicted one promoter for c5orf46. This promoter has the ID number of GXP_123762 and transcript ID number GXT_22785522. The promoter is located on the minus strand of chromosome 5, and was predicted to range from nucleotides 147906451 to 147908007, making it 1557 nucleotides in length.

=== Transcription factors ===
A total of 428 transcription factor binding sites were predicted to be located within the predicted promoter sequence. The predictions included the following transcription factors:

- Sine oculis homeodomain factors (SIXF)
- p53 tumor suppressor (P53F)
- Vertebrate homologues of enhancer of split complex (HESF)
- Histone nuclear factor P (HNFP)
- NKX homeodomain factors (NKXH)
- C/EBP homologous protein (CHOP)
- X-box binding factors (XBBF)
- TALE homeodomain class recognizing TG motifs (TALE)
- Human and murine ETS1 factors (ETSF)
- SWI/SNF related nucleophosphoproteins with a RING finger DNA binding motif (RUSH)
- Fork head domain factors (FKHD)
- RNA Polymerase II transcription factor II B (TF2B)
- TGF-beta induced apoptosis proteins (TAIP)
- GATA binding factors (GATA)
- Ccaat/Enhancer binding protein (CEBP)
- cAMP-responsive element binding proteins (CREB)
- Vertebrate TATA binding protein factor (VTBP)

== Expression ==
C5orf46 is largely expressed in salivary glands and skin tissue, though some expression in heart tissue, testis, and placenta is also observed.

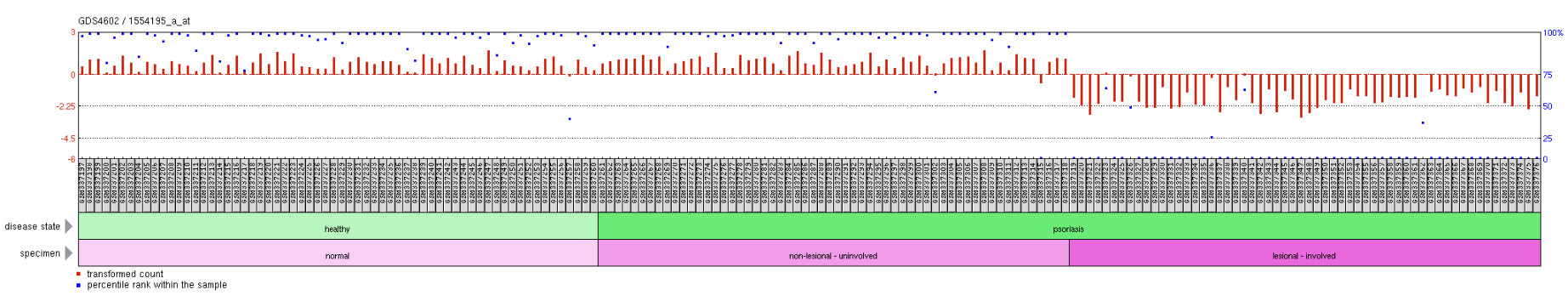
C5orf46 expression microarray data comparisons between healthy and psoriasis patients.

Microarray data measuring c5orf46 expression in psoriasis patients revealed a trend of low expression in patients with lesional psoriasis. Samples from lesional psoriasis patients had significantly lower c5orf46 expression compared to non-lesional psoriasis patients and healthy control samples.

== Protein ==
=== Primary structure ===
C5orf46 is 102 amino acids in length. The protein has a signal peptide sequence at its N-terminus. The signal peptide sequence is highly conserved in orthologs. The amino acid sequence includes a DDKPD sequence that is repeated, with an aspartate and lysine rich region.

=== Secondary structure ===
Through prediction software including the Chou and Fasman Secondary Structure Prediction server and Prabi GOR IV Prediction analysis, two alpha-helical segments were predicted.

=== Tertiary structure ===
Predictive models made by Phyre2 and SWISS-Model have shown two alpha-helical domains with a bend between them.

=== Protein regulation ===
C5orf46 has multiple predicted post-translation modification sites, and one modification identified through mass spectrometry. Mass spectrometry analysis of extracts from a NCI-H2228 lung cancer cell line have identified an acetylation site at K42. C5orf46 has predicted phosphorylation sites at T14, S52, S84, and S86. Predicted sumoylation sites are present at K41, K44, K48, K54, and K57. There are two predicted O-GlcNAcylation sites found at S100 and S101.

=== Localization ===
An analysis of the c5orf46 amino acid sequence revealed that the protein is likely to be secreted. Further sequence analyses have predicted that the protein has one transmembrane domain, with an intracellular N-terminal domain.

=== Interactions ===
C5orf46 has been predicted to interact with phosphopantothenoylcysteine synthetase (PPCS) and transmembrane BAX inhibitor motif containing 6 (TMBIM6) through affinity purification-mass spectrometry methods.

== Clinical significance ==
C5orf46 has been shown to be a prognostic marker in renal and cervical cancer, with high expression being linked to unfavorable outcomes. These conclusions were based on Human Protein Pathology Atlas gene expression analyses and survival outcomes of 651 and 291 patients with renal and cervical cancer respectively. In these analyses, patients that were classified with high expression of c5orf46 were shown to have a 50% lower survival rate after 10 years than patients with low expression.
