= N-methylphosphoethanolamine cytidylyltransferase =

Enzyme

Identifiers
- EC no.: 2.7.7.57
- CAS no.: 119345-28-7

Databases
- IntEnz: IntEnz view
- BRENDA: BRENDA entry
- ExPASy: NiceZyme view
- KEGG: KEGG entry
- MetaCyc: metabolic pathway
- PRIAM: profile
- PDB structures: RCSB PDB PDBe PDBsum
- Gene Ontology: AmiGO / QuickGO
Search
- PMC: articles
- PubMed: articles
- NCBI: proteins

In enzymology, a N-methylphosphoethanolamine cytidylyltransferase (EC 2.7.7.57) is an enzyme that catalyzes the chemical reaction

CTP + N-methylethanolamine phosphate $\rightleftharpoons$ diphosphate + CDP-N-methylethanolamine

Thus, the two substrates of this enzyme are CTP and N-methylethanolamine phosphate, whereas its two products are diphosphate and CDP-N-methylethanolamine.

This enzyme belongs to the family of transferases, specifically those transferring phosphorus-containing nucleotide groups (nucleotidyltransferases). The systematic name of this enzyme class is CTP:N-methylethanolamine-phosphate cytidylyltransferase. Other names in common use include monomethylethanolamine phosphate cytidylyltransferase, and CTP:P-MEA cytidylyltransferase.
