= D-ribitol-5-phosphate cytidylyltransferase =

InterPro Family

Identifiers
- EC no.: 2.7.7.40
- CAS no.: 9027-07-0

Databases
- IntEnz: IntEnz view
- BRENDA: BRENDA entry
- ExPASy: NiceZyme view
- KEGG: KEGG entry
- MetaCyc: metabolic pathway
- PRIAM: profile
- PDB structures: RCSB PDB PDBe PDBsum
- Gene Ontology: AmiGO / QuickGO
Search
- PMC: articles
- PubMed: articles
- NCBI: proteins

D-ribitol-5-phosphate cytidylyltransferase (EC 2.7.7.40) is an enzyme that catalyzes the chemical reaction

D-ribitol-5-phosphate
+
cytidine triphosphate
PP_{i}
PP_{i}
CDP-ribitol

The enzyme characterised from Lactobacillus arabinosus combines cytidine triphosphate and D-ribitol-5-phosphate to give CDP-ribitol, with pyrophosphate (PP_{i}) as a byproduct.

This enzyme is a transferase, specifically one transferring phosphorus-containing nucleotide groups (nucleotidyltransferases). The systematic name of this enzyme class is CTP:D-ribitol-5-phosphate cytidylyltransferase. Other names in common use include CDP ribitol pyrophosphorylase, cytidine diphosphate ribitol pyrophosphorylase, ribitol 5-phosphate cytidylyltransferase, and cytidine diphosphoribitol pyrophosphorylase.
