= PyrC leader =

In molecular biology, the PyrC leader is a cis-regulatory RNA element found at the 5' of the PyrC mRNA in Enterobacteria. The PyrC gene encodes Dihydroorotase, an enzyme involved in pyrimidine biosynthesis. The PyrC leader regulates expression of PyrC. Translation initiation can occur at four different sites within this leader sequence, under high CTP conditions the translation initiation site is upstream of that used under low CTP conditions, additional cytosine residues are incorporated into the mRNA resulting in the formation of an RNA hairpin. This hairpin blocks ribosome-binding at the Shine-Dalgarno sequence, and therefore blocks expression of PyrC. Under low CTP conditions the initiation site is further downstream and does not result in hairpin formation, so the ribosome can bind to the Shine-Dalgarno sequence and PyrC is expressed.
