= (S)-3-amino-2-methylpropionate transaminase =

Class of enzymes

Identifiers
- EC no.: 2.6.1.22
- CAS no.: 9031-95-2

Databases
- IntEnz: IntEnz view
- BRENDA: BRENDA entry
- ExPASy: NiceZyme view
- KEGG: KEGG entry
- MetaCyc: metabolic pathway
- PRIAM: profile
- PDB structures: RCSB PDB PDBe PDBsum
- Gene Ontology: AmiGO / QuickGO
Search
- PMC: articles
- PubMed: articles
- NCBI: proteins

(S)-3-amino-2-methylpropionate transaminase (EC 2.6.1.22) is an enzyme that catalyzes the reversible chemical reaction

(S)-3-aminoisobutyric acid
+
α-ketoglutaric acid
3(S)-methylmalonaldehydic acid
+
L-glutamic acid

The two substrates of this enzyme characterised from kidney and liver are (S)-3-aminoisobutyric acid and α-ketoglutaric acid. Its products are 3(S)-methylmalonaldehydic acid and L-glutamic acid.

This enzyme is a transferase, specifically a transaminase, which transfer nitrogenous groups. The systematic name of this enzyme class is (S)-3-amino-2-methylpropanoate:2-oxoglutarate aminotransferase. Other names in common use include L-3-aminoisobutyrate transaminase, beta-aminobutyric transaminase, L-3-aminoisobutyric aminotransferase, and beta-aminoisobutyrate-alpha-ketoglutarate transaminase. It participates in valine, leucine and isoleucine degradation.
