= Aspartate carbamoyltransferase =

Protein family

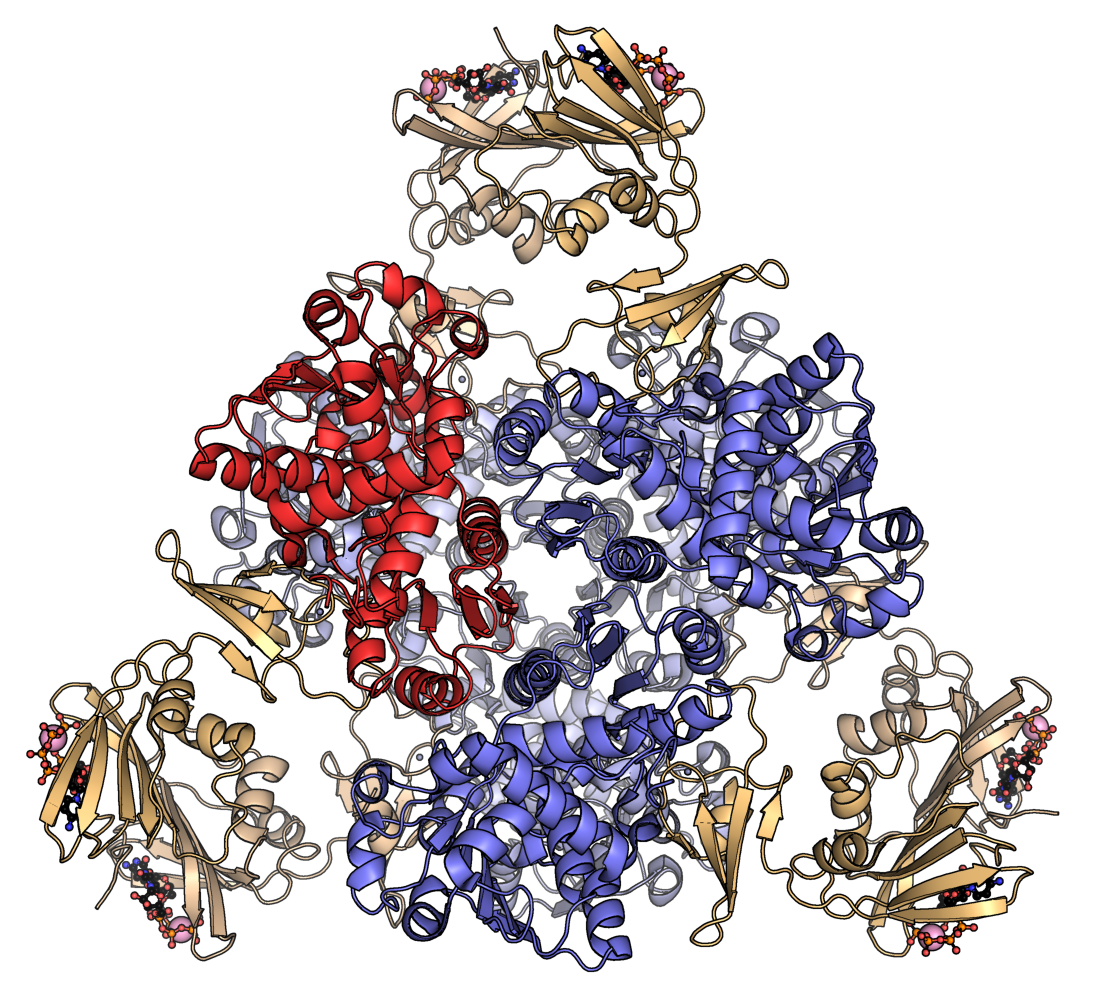
- Escherichia coli aspartate carbamoyltransferase heterododecamer with catalytic subunits coloured red and blue, and regulatory subunits in orange. PDB: 4FYY

Identifiers
- EC no.: 2.1.3.2
- CAS no.: 9012-49-1

Databases
- IntEnz: IntEnz view
- BRENDA: BRENDA entry
- ExPASy: NiceZyme view
- KEGG: KEGG entry
- MetaCyc: metabolic pathway
- PRIAM: profile
- PDB structures: RCSB PDB PDBe PDBsum
- Gene Ontology: AmiGO / QuickGO
Search
- PMC: articles
- PubMed: articles
- NCBI: proteins

Human carbamoyl-phosphate synthetase 2, aspartate transcarbamoylase, dihydroorotase

Identifiers
- Symbol: CAD
- NCBI gene: 790
- HGNC: 1424
- OMIM: 114010
- RefSeq: NM_004341
- UniProt: P27708

Other data
- EC number: 2.1.3.2
- Locus: Chr. 2 p22-p21
Search for
- Structures: Swiss-model
- Domains: InterPro

Aspartate carbamoyltransferase (also known as aspartate transcarbamoylase or ATCase) catalyzes the first step in the pyrimidine biosynthetic pathway (EC 2.1.3.2).

In E. coli, the enzyme is a multi-subunit protein complex composed of 12 subunits (300 kDa in total). The composition of the subunits is C_{6}R_{6}, forming 2 trimers of catalytic subunits (34 kDa) and 3 dimers of regulatory subunits (17 kDa). The particular arrangement of catalytic and regulatory subunits in this enzyme affords the complex with strongly allosteric behaviour with respect to its substrates. The enzyme is an archetypal example of allosteric modulation of fine control of metabolic enzyme reactions.

ATCase does not follow Michaelis–Menten kinetics. Instead, it lies between its low-activity, low-affinity "tense" and its high-activity, high-affinity "relaxed" states. The binding of substrate to the catalytic subunits results in an equilibrium shift towards the R state, whereas binding of CTP to the regulatory subunits results in an equilibrium shift towards the T state. Binding of ATP to the regulatory subunits results in an equilibrium shift towards the R state.

== Reaction ==
ATCase is a highly regulated enzyme that catalyses the first committed step in pyrimidine biosynthesis, the condensation of L-aspartate and carbamoyl phosphate to form N-carbamoyl-L-aspartate and inorganic phosphate. The catalysis by ATCase serves as the rate limiting step in pyrimidine biosynthesis because it alters its catalytic velocity in response to cellular levels of both pyrimidines and purines. The end-product of the pyrimidine pathway, CTP, decreases catalytic velocity, whereas ATP, the end-product of the parallel purine pathway, increases catalytic velocity.

Reaction of aspartate transcarbamylase.

== Structure ==
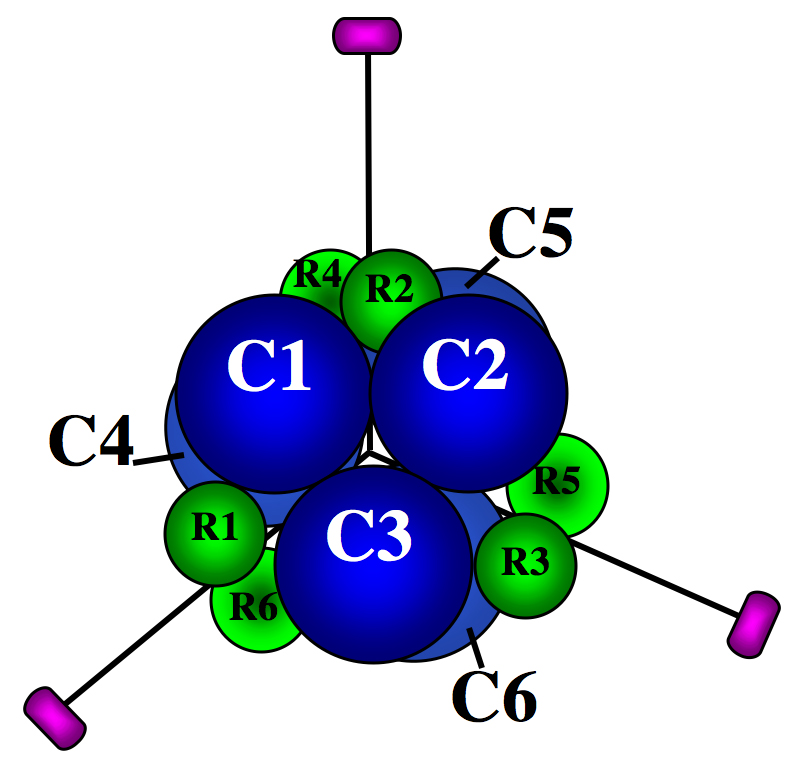
Schematic diagram of ATCase structure, depicting spatial arrangement of green regulatory (R) and blue catalytic (C) subunits. Redrawn and modified from Ke et al., 1984.

The discussion of structure, catalytic center, and allosteric site that follows is based on the prokaryotic version of ATCase, specifically E. coli's.

Early studies demonstrated that ATCase consists of two different kinds of polypeptide chains, which have different roles. The catalytic subunits catalyze the carbamylation of the amino group of aspartate but do not have regulatory properties, while the regulatory subunits do not have any catalytic activity but contain the regulatory sites for effector binding. The ATCase holoenzyme is made of two catalytic trimers that are in contact and held together by three regulatory dimers, so the native form of the enzyme contains six chains of each type, with a total molecular weight of 310 kDa.

Each of the catalytic domains is composed of two structural domains, the aspartate domain, which contains most of the residues responsible for binding aspartate, and the carbamoyl phosphate domain, which contains most of the residues that bind to carbamoyl phosphate. Each regulatory domain is also composed of two domains, the allosteric domain, which has the binding site for the nucleotide effectors, and the zinc domain, consisting of four cysteine residues clustered in its C-terminal region. These residues coordinate a zinc atom that is not involved in any catalytic property, but has been shown to be essential for the association of regulatory and catalytic subunits.

The three-dimensional arrangement of the catalytic and regulatory subunits involves several ionic and hydrophobic stabilizing contacts between amino acid residues. Each catalytic chain is in contact with three other catalytic chains and two regulatory chains. Each regulatory monomer is in contact with one other regulatory chain and two catalytic chains. In the unliganded enzyme, the two catalytic trimers are also in contact.

== Catalytic center ==
The catalytic site of ATCase is located at the interface between two neighboring catalytic chains in the same trimer and incorporates amino acid side-chains from both of these subunits. Insight into the mode of binding of substrates to the catalytic center of ATCase was first made possible by the binding of a bisubstrate analogue, N-(phosphonoacetyl)-L-aspartate (PALA). This compound is a strong inhibitor of ATCase and has a structure that is thought to be very close to that of the transition state of the substrates. Additionally, crystal structures of ATCase bound to carbamoylphosphate and succinate have been obtained. These studies, in addition to investigations using site-directed mutagenesis of specific amino acids, have identified several residues that are crucial for catalysis, such as Ser52, Thr53, Arg54, Thr55, Arg105, His134, Gln137, Arg167, Arg229, Glu231, and Ser80 and Lys84 from an adjacent catalytic chain. The active site is a highly positively charged pocket. One of the most critical side-chains is from Arg54, which interacts with a terminal oxygen and the anhydride oxygen of carbamoyl phosphate, stabilizing the negative charge of the leaving phosphate group. Arg105, His134, and Thr55 help to increase the electrophilicity of the carbonyl carbon by interacting with the carbonyl oxygen. In general, the rate enhancement of ATCase is achieved by orientation and stabilization of substrates, intermediates, and products rather than by direct involvement of amino acid residues in the catalytic mechanism.

== Allosteric site ==
The allosteric site in the allosteric domain of the R chains of the ATCase complex binds to the nucleotides ATP, CTP and/or UTP. There is one site with high affinity for ATP and CTP and one with 10- to 20-fold lower affinity for these nucleotides in each regulatory dimer. ATP binds predominantly to the high-affinity sites and subsequently activates the enzyme, while UTP and CTP binding leads to inhibition of activity. UTP can bind to the allosteric site, but inhibition of ATCase by UTP is possible only in combination with CTP. With CTP present, UTP binding is enhanced and preferentially directed to the low-affinity sites. On the converse, UTP binding leads to enhanced affinity for CTP at the high-affinity sites and together they inhibit enzyme activity by up to 95%, while CTP binding alone inhibits activity to 50% to 70%. Comparison of the crystal structures of the T and R forms of ATCase show that it swells in size during the allosteric transition, and that the catalytic subunits condense during this process. The two catalytic trimers move apart along the threefold axis by 12 Å, and they rotate about this axis by 5° each, ultimately leading to a reorientation of the regulatory subunits around their twofold axis by 15°. This quaternary structure change is associated with alterations in inter-subunit and inter-domain interactions. The interaction between subunits C1-C4 and R1 is extensively modified during this conversion. In particular, there is large movement of amino acid residues 230–254, known collectively as the 240s loop. These residues are located at the cleft between the carbamoyl phosphate and aspartate domains at the C1-C4 interface. The overall outcome of these structural changes is that the two domains of each catalytic chain come closer together, ensuring a better contact with the substrates or their analogues.

During this structural transition, some interactions between side-chains are lost and some others are established. Studies have confirmed that the position of the 240s loop directly affects substrate binding in the corresponding active site. Earlier studies using site-directed mutagenesis of the 240s loop showed that interactions between Asp271 and Tyr240, and between Glu239 of C1 and Tyr165 of C4 would stabilize the T-state, while interactions between Glu239 of C1 and both Lys164 and Tyr165 of C4 would stabilize the R-state.

Located close to the 240s loop and the active site, the loop region encompassing residues 160–166 plays a role in both the internal architecture of the enzyme and its regulatory properties. In particular, the residue Asp162 interacts with Gln231 (known to be involved in aspartate binding), and binds the same residues in both the T and R states. A mutant that had this residue mutated to alanine showed a huge reduction in specific activity, a two-fold decrease in the affinity for aspartate, a loss of homotropic cooperativity, and decreased activation by ATP. It was suggested that the change in the overall structure caused by the introduction of this residue affects other residues in the R1-C1, R1-C4 and C1-C4 interfaces, which are involved in the quaternary structure transition.

== Assembly of the complex ==
The regulatory and catalytic subunits exist as fused protein homologs, providing strong evidence that they would interact together. Two catalytic trimers and two regulatory dimers assemble to form an intermediate of aspartate carbamoyltransferase consisting of 6 catalytic subunits and 4 regulatory subunits.
