= CTP synthase 1 =

Protein found in humans

CTPS1
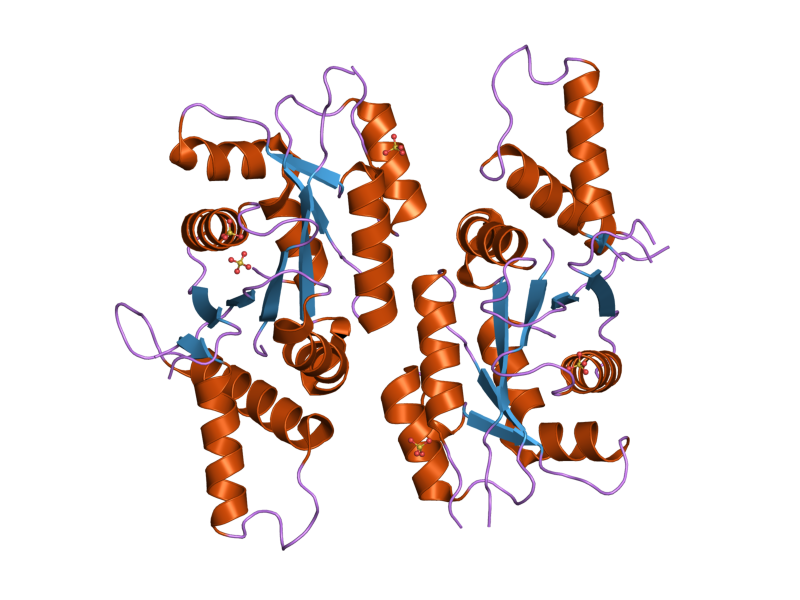

Identifiers
- Aliases: CTPS1, CTPS, IMD24, CTP synthase 1, GATD5
- External IDs: OMIM: 123860; MGI: 1858304; GeneCards: CTPS1
Available structures
PDB	Ortholog search: PDBe RCSB
PDB	List of PDB id codes 2VO1
Enzyme activity
EC #	BRENDA	ExPASy	KEGG	MetaCyc
6.3.4.2	↗	↗	↗	↗

Gene location (Human)
Chr.	Chromosome 1 (human)
Band	1p34.2	Start	40,979,335 bp
Band	1p34.2	End	41,012,565 bp

Gene location (Mouse)
Chr.	Chromosome 4 (mouse)
Band	4 D2.1|4 56.52 cM	Start	120,397,065 bp
Band	4 D2.1|4 56.52 cM	End	120,427,473 bp
RNA expression pattern
Bgee	Human / Mouse (ortholog); Top expressed in: parotid gland; ascending aorta; left uterine tube; right coronary artery; left coronary artery; gonad; body of uterus; popliteal artery; tibial arteries; muscle layer of sigmoid colon / Top expressed in: hair follicle; primitive streak; primary oocyte; superior cervical ganglion; mandibular prominence; somite; maxillary prominence; endothelial cell of lymphatic vessel; endocardial cushion; zygote; More reference expression data
BioGPS	n/a
Gene ontology
Molecular function	nucleotide binding; ligase activity; ATP binding; CTP synthase activity; identical protein binding
Cellular component	cytosol; membrane; cytoplasm; cytoophidium
Biological process	T cell proliferation; B cell proliferation; nucleobase-containing small molecule interconversion; glutamine metabolic process; nucleobase-containing compound metabolic process; 'de novo' CTP biosynthetic process; pyrimidine nucleotide biosynthetic process; immune system process; CTP biosynthetic process; pyrimidine nucleobase biosynthetic process
Sources:Amigo / QuickGO
Orthologs
Databases	NCBI: entry; OMA: entry
Species	Human	Mouse
Entrez	1503	51797
Ensembl	ENSG00000171793	ENSMUSG00000028633
UniProt	P17812	P70698
RefSeq (mRNA)	NM_001301237; NM_001905	NM_016748; NM_001355491
RefSeq (protein)	NP_001288166; NP_001896	NP_058028; NP_001342420
Location (UCSC)	Chr 1: 40.98 – 41.01 Mb	Chr 4: 120.4 – 120.43 Mb
PubMed search
- Wikidata
View/Edit Human	View/Edit Mouse

CTP synthase 1 is an enzyme that is encoded by the CTPS1 gene in humans. CTP synthase 1 is an enzyme in the de novo pyrimidine synthesis pathway that catalyses the conversion of uridine triphosphate (UTP) to cytidine triphosphate (CTP). CTP is a key building block for the production of DNA, RNA and some phospholipids.

== Structure and function ==
CTPS1 is an asymmetrical homotetramer with only three of its four monomers contributing to the catalytic domain. The substrates required for enzymatic activity are adenosine triphosphate (ATP), UTP and the amino acid glutamine. The ATP and UTP binding domains are located at the tetramer interface, whereas the glutamine binding domain is located away from the tetramer interface.

Glutamine is hydrolysed by the glutamine amidotransferase domain on the outside of the CTPS1 enzyme. The ammonia produced is channelled through to the synthase domain in the interior of the enzyme, to the tetrameric interface. ATP-dependent phosphorylation of UTP produces 4-phosphoryl UTP, which reacts with the ammonia to produce CTP. The reaction can also take place using ammonia in solution in place of the glutamine-derived ammonia. Guanosine triphosphate (GTP) is an allosteric activator of enzyme activity which stimulates the hydrolysis of glutamine. CTP is an allosteric inhibitor of enzyme activity; the CTP binding site overlaps with and impedes the UTP binding site. Thus, CTPS1 enzymatic activity is sensitive to the levels of all four essential ribonucleotides.

== De novo pyrimidine synthesis pathway ==
The conversion of UTP to CTP is the final and rate limiting step in the de novo pyrimidine synthesis pathway. This step is unusual as it is catalysed by two homologous enzymes, CTPS1 and CTPS2, which share 74% homology at the protein level in humans. Human genetics suggest different cellular dependencies on CTPS1 and CTPS2 activity (see below).

Pyrimidines can also be generated by a salvage pathway that recycles DNA. Whilst the salvage pathway is sufficient for pyrimidine production in non-dividing cells, de novo pyrimidine synthesis is required for dividing cells.

== Clinical significance ==
=== Inherited mutations ===
Inherited CTPS1 deficiency is associated with a severe immunodeficiency syndrome characterised by life-threatening varicella zoster virus (VZV) and Epstein–Barr virus (EBV) infection in the first decade of life. Several cases of EBV-associated lymphoproliferative disease have also been observed, including in the central nervous system. Importantly, no phenotype has been observed outside of the blood system, suggesting that CTPS2 is able to compensate for the CTPS1 loss in other tissues.

All individuals described to date are homozygous for the same splicing mutation in CTPS1, which results in skipping of exon 18 resulting in a severely hypomorphic enzyme. All reported families have ancestry in the North West of England, indicating a founder effect for the causative mutation.

The blood systems of individuals with inherited CTPS1 deficiency are characterised by the following:

1. Normal numbers of T cells, normal T cell subsets
2. Near absence of invariant NKT cells and mucosal associated invariant T cell
3. Normal numbers of total B cells, reduced proportion of memory B cells
4. Reduced numbers of NK cells
5. Severely impaired T cell proliferation response and reduced IL-2 secretion following activation
6. Impaired B cell proliferation response following activation
7. Elevated IgG with selective deficiencies of specific antibodies
8. Normal numbers and subset distribution of myeloid cells and dendritic cells

Inherited CTPS1 deficiency can be cured by allogeneic bone marrow transplantation.

=== Cancer ===
Increased expression of CTPS1 has been reported to play a role in several different cancer types.

High expression of CTPS1 has been reported to impart a worse prognosis in myeloma, pancreatic cancer and breast cancer.

miR-125b-5p was identified as a tumour suppressor which is down regulated in squamous cell lung cancer; CTPS1 is a potential target of miR-125b-5p, and loss of expression of this miR is predicted to result in increased expression of CTPS1.

CTPS1 knock down by shRNA inhibited tumour cell growth in a breast cancer model. CTPS1 knock down by CRISPR showed synergy with inhibition of ATR in a model of MYC-driven cancer.

== CTPS1 as a therapeutic target ==
=== Cancer therapy ===
The high proliferation rates and metabolic activity of cancer cells are likely to result in a critical dependency on the de novo pyrimidine synthesis pathway. This dependency is exploited therapeutically by several chemotherapy drugs that block de novo pyrimidine synthesis, including the nucleotide analogues cytosine arabinoside (ara-C) and gemcitabine.

Cyclopentenyl cytosine (CPEC) is an inhibitor of both CTPS1 and CTPS2, with activity thought to be mediated by its 5'-triphosphate metabolite CPEC-TP. In phase 1 clinical studies, CPEC administration resulted in unpredictable and refractory hypotension, including fatal events, resulting in discontinuation of clinical development.

Recently, selective small molecule inhibitors have been described with a high degree of selectivity for CTPS1 over CTPS2. The binding mode and mechanism of CTPS1 selectivity has been resolved by cryo-EM which showed docking of the compounds to the CTP binding site of the enzyme. A lead clinical candidate from this chemical series has shown efficacy in preclinical models of B and T cell neoplasia.

A selective CTPS1 inhibitor dencatistat (STP938) is currently in clinical trials for the treatment of lymphomas, solid tumors, and essential thrombocythemia.

=== Anti-viral therapy ===
Nucleoside analogues have a long history in the treatment of viral infection.

Specific inhibition of CTP synthase has been identified as a target for anti-viral therapies.

Epstein–Barr virus (EBV) upregulates the expression of both CTPS1 and CTPS2 in infected B cells, with the expression of CTPS1 increasing earlier than CTPS2. The EBV protein ENBA-LP binds to the CTPS1 promoter, along with MYC and NFκB, to enhance expression of CTPS1.

SARS-CoV-2, the virus that causes COVID-19, uses CTPS1 from infected cells to drive its proliferation; inhibition of CTPS1 has been highlighted as a potential anti-viral therapy.
