= Phosphopantothenate—cysteine ligase =

Mammalian protein found in humans

Identifiers
- EC no.: 6.3.2.5
- CAS no.: 9023-50-1

Databases
- BRENDA: enzyme data
- ExPASy: NiceZyme view
- KEGG: enzyme entry
- MetaCyc: metabolic pathway
- Rhea: reactions
- PDB structures: RCSB PDB PDBe PDBsum
- Gene Ontology: AmiGO / QuickGO
Search
- PMC: articles
- PubMed: articles
- NCBI: proteins

In enzymology, a phosphopantothenate—cysteine ligase also known as phosphopantothenoylcysteine synthetase (PPCS) is an enzyme (EC 6.3.2.5) that catalyzes the chemical reaction which constitutes the second of five steps involved in the conversion of pantothenate to Coenzyme A. The reaction is:

NTP + (R)-4'-phosphopantothenate + L-cysteine $\rightleftharpoons$ NMP + diphosphate + N-[(R)-4'-phosphopantothenoyl]-L-cysteine

The nucleoside triphosphate (NTP) involved in the reaction varies from species to species. Phosphopantothenate—cysteine ligase from the bacterium Escherichia coli uses cytidine triphosphate (CTP) as an energy donor, whilst the human isoform uses adenosine triphosphate (ATP).

== Nomenclature ==
This enzyme belongs to the family of ligases, specifically those forming carbon-nitrogen bonds as acid-D-amino-acid ligases (peptide syntheses). The systematic name of this enzyme class is (R)-4'-phosphopantothenate:L-cysteine ligase. This enzyme is also called phosphopantothenoylcysteine synthetase.

== Gene ==
PPCS

Identifiers
- Aliases: PPCS, Phosphopantothenate—cysteine ligase, phosphopantothenoylcysteine synthetase, CMD2C
- External IDs: OMIM: 609853; MGI: 1915237; GeneCards: PPCS
Available structures
PDB	Ortholog search: PDBe RCSB
PDB	List of PDB id codes 1P9O
Enzyme activity
EC #	BRENDA	ExPASy	KEGG	MetaCyc
6.3.2.51	↗	↗	↗	↗

Gene location (Human)
Chr.	Chromosome 1 (human)
Band	1p34.2	Start	42,456,117 bp
Band	1p34.2	End	42,473,385 bp

Gene location (Mouse)
Chr.	Chromosome 4 (mouse)
Band	4|4 D2.1	Start	119,275,727 bp
Band	4|4 D2.1	End	119,279,617 bp
RNA expression pattern
Bgee	Human / Mouse (ortholog); Top expressed in: right adrenal cortex; body of pancreas; Achilles tendon; rectum; mucosa of transverse colon; monocyte; left adrenal gland; left adrenal cortex; body of stomach; gallbladder / Top expressed in: right kidney; transitional epithelium of urinary bladder; proximal tubule; lumbar spinal ganglion; yolk sac; adrenal gland; left lobe of liver; human kidney; epithelium of small intestine; duodenum; More reference expression data
BioGPS	n/a
Gene ontology
Molecular function	phosphopantothenate--cysteine ligase activity; ligase activity
Cellular component	cytosol
Biological process	coenzyme A biosynthetic process
Sources:Amigo / QuickGO
Orthologs
Databases	NCBI: entry; OMA: entry
Species	Human	Mouse
Entrez	79717	106564
Ensembl	ENSG00000127125	ENSMUSG00000028636
UniProt	Q9HAB8	Q8VDG5
RefSeq (mRNA)	NM_001077447; NM_001287506; NM_001287507; NM_001287508; NM_001287509 NM_001287510; NM_001287511; NM_024664	NM_026494; NM_001355214
RefSeq (protein)	NP_001070915; NP_001274435; NP_001274436; NP_001274437; NP_001274438 NP_001274439; NP_001274440; NP_078940	NP_080770; NP_001342143
Location (UCSC)	Chr 1: 42.46 – 42.47 Mb	Chr 4: 119.28 – 119.28 Mb
PubMed search
- Wikidata
View/Edit Human	View/Edit Mouse

Phosphopantothenoylcysteine synthetase in humans is encoded by the PPCS gene.

== Protein structure ==
As of late 2007, 5 structures have been solved for this class of enzymes, with PDB accession codes PDB: 1P9O, PDB: 1U7U, PDB: 1U7W, PDB: 1U7Z, and PDB: 1U80.
