= Dencatistat =

Investigational drug

Clinical data
- Other names: STP938

Identifiers
- IUPAC name: 4-[2-(cyclopropylsulfonylamino)pyrimidin-4-yl]-N-[5-(6-ethoxypyrazin-2-yl)-2-pyridinyl]oxane-4-carboxamide
- CAS Number: 2377000-84-3
- PubChem CID: 139509953
- UNII: QG9C9SZZ3T
- ChEMBL: ChEMBL5436583

Chemical and physical data
- Formula: C24H27N7O5S
- Molar mass: 525.58 g·mol^{−1}
- 3D model (JSmol): Interactive image
- SMILES: CCOC1=NC(=CN=C1)C2=CN=C(C=C2)NC(=O)C3(CCOCC3)C4=NC(=NC=C4)NS(=O)(=O)C5CC5
- InChI: InChI=InChI=1S/C24H27N7O5S/c1-2-36-21-15-25-14-18(28-21)16-3-6-20(27-13-16)30-22(32)24(8-11-35-12-9-24)19-7-10-26-23(29-19)31-37(33,34)17-4-5-17/h3,6-7,10,13-15,17H,2,4-5,8-9,11-12H2,1H3,(H,26,29,31)(H,27,30,32); Key:WVCJRTCHVUNXST-UHFFFAOYSA-N

Dencatistat is an investigational new drug that is being evaluated by Step Pharma for the treatment of essential thrombocythemia, B-cell lymphoma, and T-cell lymphoma. It is a CTPS1 enzyme inhibitor.

== Clinical trials ==
Dencatistat is currently under clinical trials for lymphomas, solid tumors, and essential thrombocythemia.
