= Beta-ureidopropionase =

Class of enzymes

Identifiers
- EC no.: 3.5.1.6
- CAS no.: 9027-27-4

Databases
- BRENDA: enzyme data
- ExPASy: NiceZyme view
- KEGG: enzyme entry
- MetaCyc: metabolic pathway
- Rhea: reactions
- PDB structures: RCSB PDB PDBe PDBsum
- Gene Ontology: AmiGO / QuickGO
Search
- PMC: articles
- PubMed: articles
- NCBI: proteins

Beta-ureidopropionase (EC 3.5.1.6) is an enzyme that catalyzes the chemical reaction

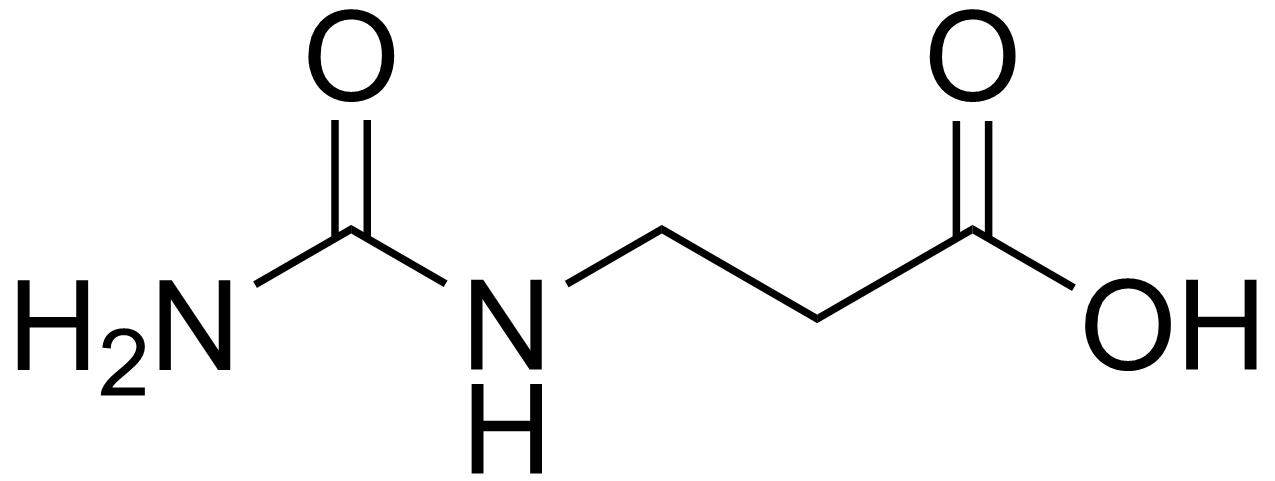
3-ureidopropionic acid
H_{2}O
NH_{3}
β-alanine
+ CO_{2}

The enzyme characterised from rat liver hydrolyses 3-ureidopropionic acid to β-alanine, with ammonia and carbon dioxide as byproducts. In humans, the reaction is part of the breakdown of pyrimidines.

This enzyme is a hydrolase, one acting on carbon-nitrogen bonds other than peptide bonds, specifically in linear amides. The systematic name of this enzyme class is N-carbamoyl-beta-alanine amidohydrolase.

== Structural studies ==
As of late 2007, 6 structures have been solved for this class of enzymes, with PDB accession codes PDB: 1R3N, PDB: 1R43, PDB: 2V8D, PDB: 2V8G, PDB: 2V8H, and PDB: 2V8V.
