= 3-Aminoisobutyric acid =

Product of thymine metabolism

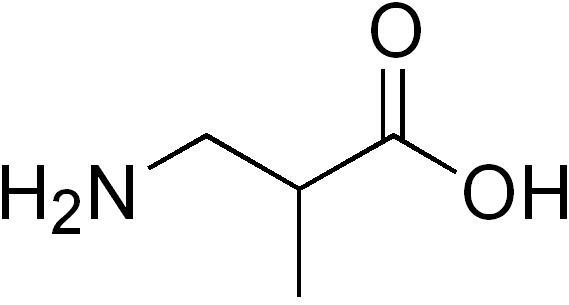

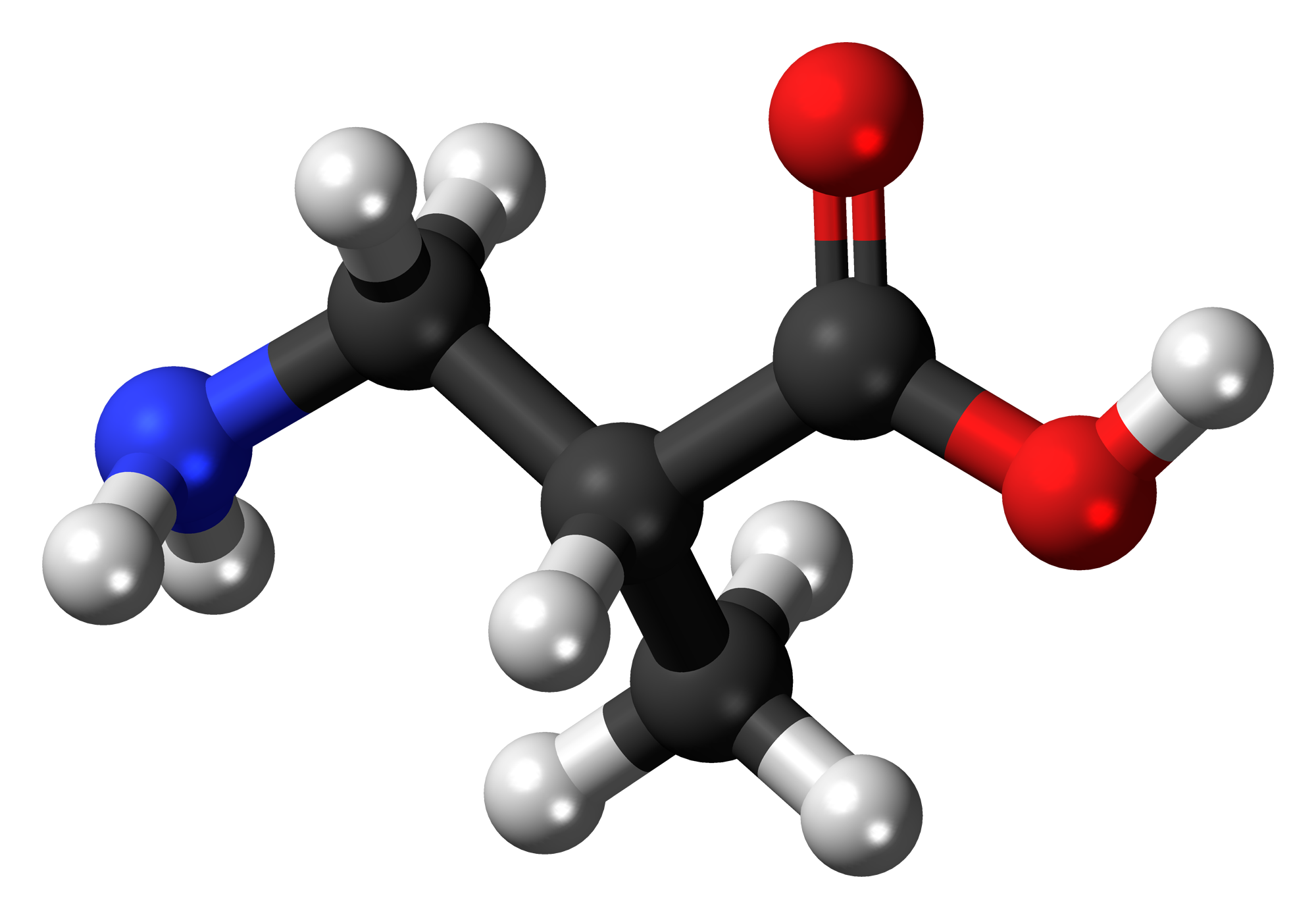

Names
- Preferred IUPAC name 3-Amino-2-methylpropanoic acid
- Other names 3-Aminoisobutyrate

Identifiers
CAS Number	144-90-1
3D model (JSmol)	Interactive image; Interactive image
ChEBI	CHEBI:27389
ChemSpider	58481
ECHA InfoCard	100.005.132
KEGG	C05145
PubChem CID	64956
UNII	T68ALE2O9F
CompTox Dashboard (EPA)	DTXSID10861821
- InChI: InChI=1S/C4H9NO2/c1-3(2-5)4(6)7/h3H,2,5H2,1H3,(H,6,7) Key: QCHPKSFMDHPSNR-UHFFFAOYSA-N; InChI=1/C4H9NO2/c1-3(2-5)4(6)7/h3H,2,5H2,1H3,(H,6,7) Key: QCHPKSFMDHPSNR-UHFFFAOYAN
- SMILES: CC(CN)C(=O)O; O=C(O)C(C)CN

Properties
Chemical formula	C_{4}H_{9}NO_{2}
Molar mass	103.12 g/mol
- Except where otherwise noted, data are given for materials in their standard state (at 25 °C [77 °F], 100 kPa). verify (what is ?) Infobox references

3-Aminoisobutyric acid (also known as β-aminoisobutyric acid or BAIBA) is a product formed by the catabolism of thymine and valine.

During exercise, the increase of PGC-1α protein triggers the secretion of BAIBA from exercising muscles into the blood (concentration 2 to 3 μM in human serum). When BAIBA reaches white fat tissue, it activates the expression of thermogenic genes via PPARα receptors, resulting in browning of white fat cells. One of the consequences of BAIBA activity is increased background metabolism of BAIBA target cells.

BAIBA is thought to play a number of roles in cell metabolism, regulation of fat burning, and regulation of insulin, blood triglycerides, and total cholesterol.

BAIBA is found as a normal metabolite of skeletal muscle (myokine). Its plasma concentrations are increased by exercise. The increased production is likely a result of enhanced mitochondrial activity, as this increase is also observed in muscle of PGC-1a overexpression mice. BAIBA is a proposed protective factor against metabolic disorders since it can induce brown fat function. But healthy diet with exercise is better.

== See also ==
- β-Alanine
- beta-Hydroxy beta-methylbutyric acid (HMB) – Chemical compound
- GABA – Inhibitory neurotransmitter in the mammalian brain
- MB-3 (drug) – Chemical compound
