= CTPS2 =

Protein-coding gene in humans

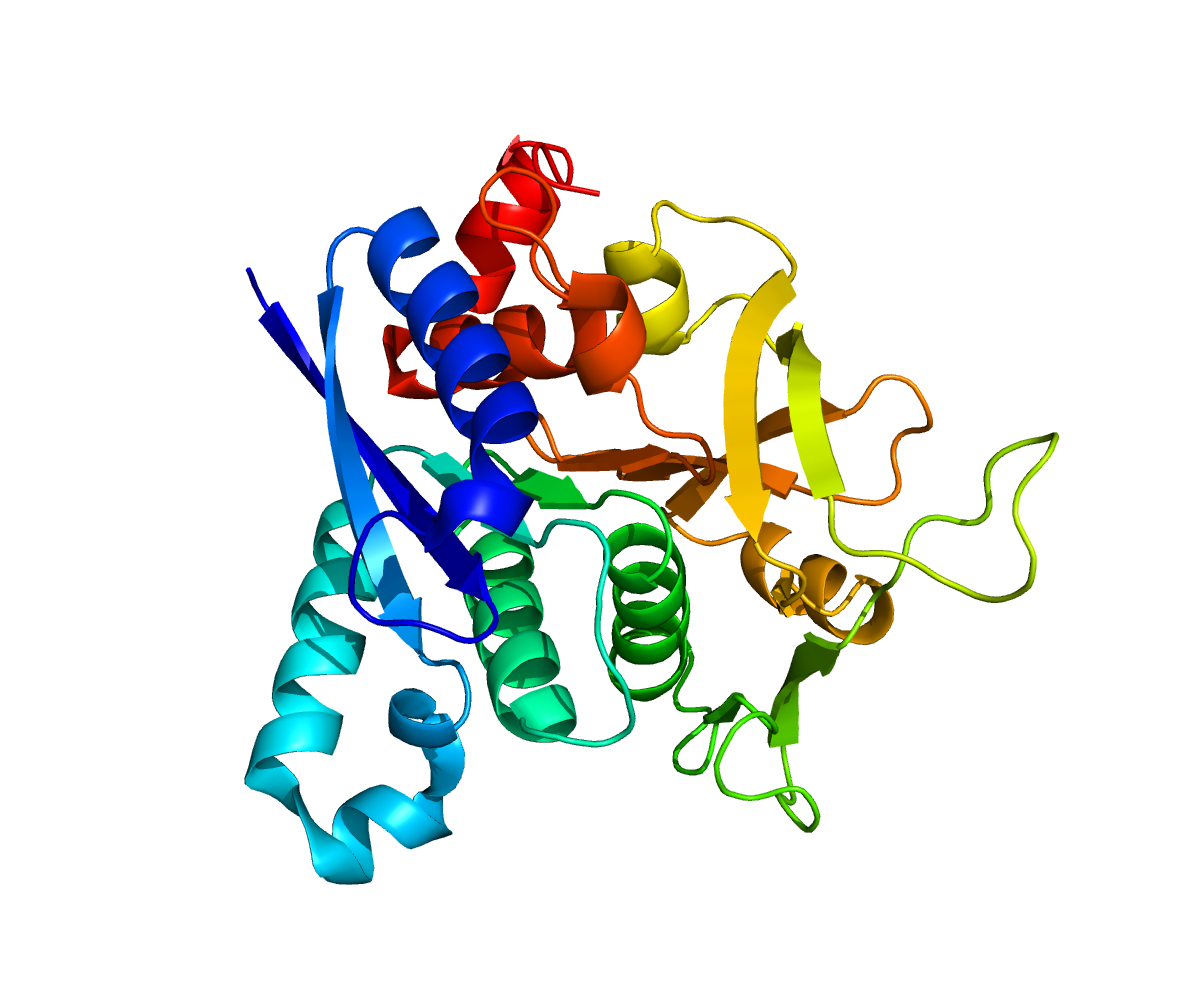

Identifiers
- Aliases: CTPS2, CTP synthase 2, GATD5B
- External IDs: OMIM: 300380; MGI: 1933185; GeneCards: CTPS2
Available structures
PDB	Ortholog search: PDBe RCSB
PDB	List of PDB id codes 2V4U, 2VKT, 3IHL
Enzyme activity
EC #	BRENDA	ExPASy	KEGG	MetaCyc
6.3.4.2	↗	↗	↗	↗

Gene location (Human)
Chr.	X chromosome (human)
Band	Xp22.2	Start	16,587,999 bp
Band	Xp22.2	End	16,712,936 bp

Gene location (Mouse)
Chr.	X chromosome (mouse)
Band	X|X F4	Start	161,684,234 bp
Band	X|X F4	End	161,815,504 bp
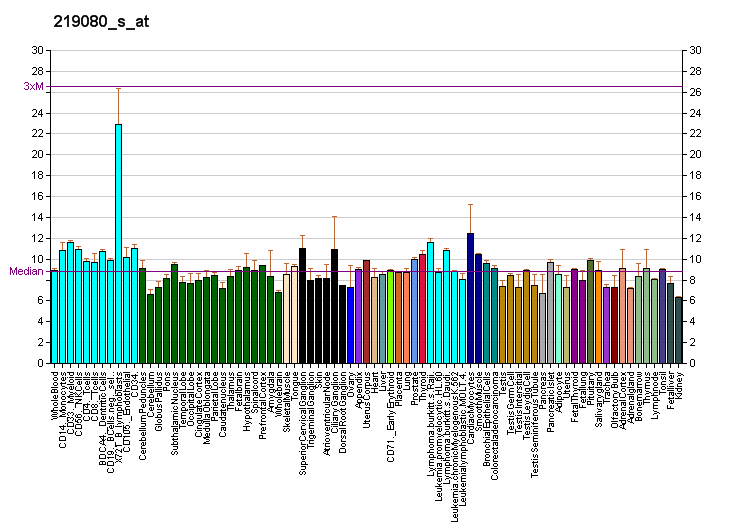
RNA expression pattern
Bgee	Human / Mouse (ortholog); Top expressed in: jejunal mucosa; ventricular zone; body of pancreas; canal of the cervix; right ovary; left ovary; ganglionic eminence; Achilles tendon; duodenum; right uterine tube / Top expressed in: granulocyte; genital tubercle; endothelial cell of lymphatic vessel; ventricular zone; tail of embryo; right kidney; external carotid artery; internal carotid artery; facial motor nucleus; proximal tubule; More reference expression data
BioGPS	More reference expression data
Gene ontology
Molecular function	ligase activity; nucleotide binding; protein binding; ATP binding; CTP synthase activity; identical protein binding
Cellular component	cytosol; cytoplasm; cytoophidium
Biological process	pyrimidine nucleotide metabolic process; glutamine metabolic process; 'de novo' CTP biosynthetic process; pyrimidine nucleotide biosynthetic process; nucleobase-containing small molecule interconversion; CTP biosynthetic process; pyrimidine nucleobase biosynthetic process
Sources:Amigo / QuickGO
Orthologs
Databases	NCBI: entry; OMA: entry
Species	Human	Mouse
Entrez	56474	55936
Ensembl	ENSG00000047230	ENSMUSG00000031360
UniProt	Q9NRF8	P70303
RefSeq (mRNA)	NM_001144002; NM_019857; NM_175859	NM_001168568; NM_001168569; NM_001168571; NM_018737; NM_001358398
RefSeq (protein)	NP_001137474; NP_062831; NP_787055	NP_001162040; NP_001162041; NP_001162043; NP_061207; NP_001345327
Location (UCSC)	Chr X: 16.59 – 16.71 Mb	Chr X: 161.68 – 161.82 Mb
PubMed search
- Wikidata
View/Edit Human	View/Edit Mouse

CTP synthase 2 is an enzyme that in humans is encoded by the CTPS2 gene.

The protein encoded by this gene catalyzes the formation of CTP from UTP with the concomitant deamination of glutamine to glutamate.

This protein is the rate-limiting enzyme in the synthesis of cytosine nucleotides, which play an important role in various metabolic processes and provide the precursors necessary for the synthesis of RNA and DNA. Cancer cells that exhibit increased cell proliferation also exhibit an increased activity of this encoded protein.

Thus, this protein is an attractive target for selective chemotherapy. Two alternatively spliced transcript variants encoding the same protein have been described for this gene.
