= Cytidine triphosphate =

Chemical compound

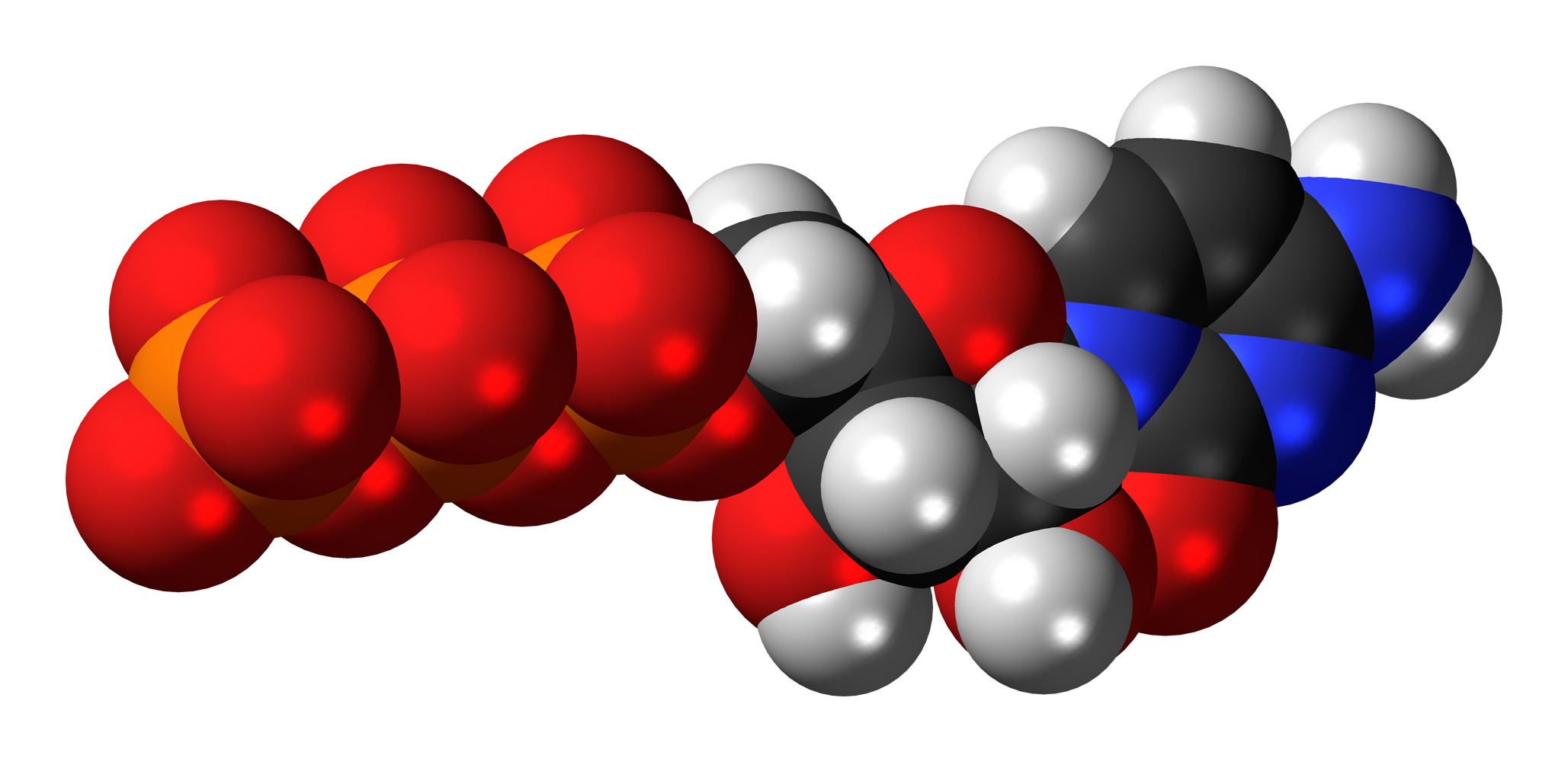

Names
- IUPAC name Cytidine 5′-(tetrahydrogen triphosphate)
- Systematic IUPAC name O^{1}-{[(2R,3S,4R,5R)-5-(4-Amino-2-oxopyrimidin-1(2H)-yl)-3,4-dihydroxyoxolan-2-yl]methyl} tetrahydrogen triphosphate
- Other names CTP; Cytidine-5'-triphosphate

Identifiers
| CAS Number | 65-47-4 |
| 3D model (JSmol) | Interactive image; Interactive image |
| ChemSpider | 19952488 |
| ECHA InfoCard | 100.000.556 |
| IUPHAR/BPS | 1741 |
| MeSH | Cytidine+triphosphate |
| PubChem CID | 6176 |
| UNII | K0118UX80T |
| CompTox Dashboard (EPA) | DTXSID70889324 |
- InChI: InChI=1S/C9H13N3O5.3H3O4P/c10-5-1-2-12(9(16)11-5)8-7(15)6(14)4(3-13)17-8;3*1-5(2,3)4/h1-2,4,6-8,13-15H,3H2,(H2,10,11,16);3*(H3,1,2,3,4)/t4-,6-,7-,8-;;;/m1.../s1 Key: NPIWPFUCEAMYFN-LLWADOMFSA-N; InChI=1/C9H16N3O14P3/c10-5-1-2-12(9(15)11-5)8-7(14)6(13)4(24-8)3-23-28(19,20)26-29(21,22)25-27(16,17)18/h1-2,4,6-8,13-14H,3H2,(H,19,20)(H,21,22)(H2,10,11,15)(H2,16,17,18)/t4-,6-,7-,8-/m1/s1 Key: PCDQPRRSZKQHHS-XVFCMESIBL; InChI=1/C9H13N3O5.3H3O4P/c10-5-1-2-12(9(16)11-5)8-7(15)6(14)4(3-13)17-8;3*1-5(2,3)4/h1-2,4,6-8,13-15H,3H2,(H2,10,11,16);3*(H3,1,2,3,4)/t4-,6-,7-,8-;;;/m1.../s1 Key: NPIWPFUCEAMYFN-LLWADOMFBY
- SMILES: c1cn(c(=O)nc1N)[C@H]2[C@@H]([C@@H]([C@H](O2)CO[P@](=O)(O)O[P@](=O)(O)OP(=O)(O)O)O)O; OP(O)(=O)O.OP(O)(=O)O.OP(O)(=O)O.N/C1=N/C(=O)N(/C=C1)[C@@H]2O[C@H](CO)[C@@H](O)[C@H]2O

Properties
| Chemical formula | C_{9}H_{16}N_{3}O_{14}P_{3} |
| Molar mass | 483.156 |
| Melting point | 215 to 218 °C (419 to 424 °F; 488 to 491 K) |
- Except where otherwise noted, data are given for materials in their standard state (at 25 °C [77 °F], 100 kPa). verify (what is ?) Infobox references

Cytidine triphosphate (CTP) is a pyrimidine nucleoside triphosphate. CTP, much like ATP, consists of a ribose sugar, and three phosphate groups. The major difference between the two molecules is the base used, which in CTP is cytosine.

CTP is a substrate in the synthesis of RNA.

CTP is a high-energy molecule similar to ATP, but its role as an energy coupler is limited to a much smaller subset of metabolic reactions. CTP is a coenzyme in metabolic reactions like the synthesis of glycerophospholipids, where it is used for activation and transfer of diacylglycerol and lipid head groups, and glycosylation of proteins.

CTP acts as an inhibitor of the enzyme aspartate carbamoyltransferase, which is used in pyrimidine biosynthesis.

== See also ==
- CTP synthase
- Cytidine
- Cytosine
- Pyrimidine biosynthesis
