= Acute uric acid nephropathy =

Decreasing kidney function due to high levels of uric acid in the urine

- Specialty: Nephrology

Acute uric acid nephropathy (AUAN, also acute urate nephropathy) is a rapidly worsening (decreasing) kidney function (acute kidney injury) that is caused by high levels of uric acid in the urine (hyperuricosuria).

== Causes ==
Acute uric acid nephropathy is usually seen as part of the acute tumour lysis syndrome in patients undergoing chemotherapy or radiation therapy for the treatment of malignancies with rapid cell turnover, such as leukemia and lymphoma. It may also occur in these patients before treatment is begun, due to spontaneous tumor cell lysis (high incidence in Burkitt's lymphoma).

Acute uric acid nephropathy can also be caused by an acute attack of gout.

== Pathophysiology ==
Acute uric acid nephropathy is caused by deposition of uric acid crystals within the kidney interstitium and tubules, leading to partial or complete obstruction of collecting ducts, renal pelvis, or ureter. This obstruction is usually bilateral, and patients follow the clinical course of acute kidney failure.

== Diagnosis ==
The picture of acute kidney failure is observed: decreased urine production and rapidly rising serum creatinine levels. Acute uric acid nephropathy is differentiated from other forms of acute kidney failure by the finding of a urine uric acid/creatinine ratio > 1 in a random urine sample.

== Prevention ==
Patients at risk for acute uric acid nephropathy can be given allopurinol or rasburicase (a recombinant urate oxidase) prior to treatment with cytotoxic drugs.

== Treatment ==
Treatment is focused on preventing deposition of uric acid within the urinary system by increasing urine volume with potent diuretics such as furosemide. Raising the urinary pH to a level higher than 7 (alkalinization) is often difficult to attain, although sodium bicarbonate and/or acetazolamide are sometimes used in an attempt to increase uric acid solubility.

Dialysis (preferably hemodialysis) is started if the above measures fail.
