= QRICH2 =

Protein-coding gene in the species Homo sapiens

Identifiers
- Aliases: QRICH2, glutamine rich 2, SPGF35
- External IDs: OMIM: 618304; MGI: 2684912; HomoloGene: 12951; GeneCards: QRICH2; OMA:QRICH2 - orthologs

Gene location (Human)
Chr.	Chromosome 17 (human)
Band	17q25.1	Start	76,274,049 bp
Band	17q25.1	End	76,308,276 bp

Gene location (Mouse)
Chr.	Chromosome 11 (mouse)
Band	11|11 E2	Start	116,332,151 bp
Band	11|11 E2	End	116,357,067 bp
RNA expression pattern
Bgee	Human / Mouse (ortholog); Top expressed in: left testis; right testis; right lobe of thyroid gland; ventricular zone; stromal cell of endometrium; cerebellar hemisphere; right hemisphere of cerebellum; left lobe of thyroid gland; sural nerve; ganglionic eminence / Top expressed in: spermatid; seminiferous tubule; spermatocyte; zygote; embryo; embryo; primary oocyte; epiblast; secondary oocyte; granulocyte; More reference expression data
BioGPS	n/a
Orthologs
Species	Human	Mouse
Entrez	84074	217341
Ensembl	ENSG00000129646	ENSMUSG00000070331
UniProt	Q9H0J4	Q3V2A7
RefSeq (mRNA)	NM_032134; NM_001388453	NM_001033267
RefSeq (protein)	NP_115510	NP_001028439
Location (UCSC)	Chr 17: 76.27 – 76.31 Mb	Chr 11: 116.33 – 116.36 Mb
PubMed search
- Wikidata
View/Edit Human	View/Edit Mouse

Glutamine-rich protein 2 is a protein that in humans is encoded by the QRICH2 gene on human chromosome 17. The function of QRICH2 protein is mostly unknown, but it has been shown that QRICH2 gene contains a high molecular weight glutenin domain and an ATPase involved domain. QRICH2 gene is highly expressed in testis, and the subcellular location of QRICH2 protein is in the nucleus.

NCBI Reference Number	Length	location	Molecular weight	PI
mRNA: NM_032134.1 Protein: NP_115510.1	mRNA: 5411 bp Protein: 1663 aa	17q25.1	180.8 kDa	6.25

== Gene ==
QRICH2 mRNA is 5411 bp long, and its chromosomal location in human is 17q25.1. QRICH2 mRNA has 19 exons and it contains two main function domains: a high molecular weight glutenin domain (amino acid 446-979) and an ATPase involved domain (amino acid 1036-1413). QRICH2 locates between UBAL D2 gene and PRPSAP1 gene on chromosome 17. There is no predicted stem loop structure on QRICH2 mRNA because there isn't any complementary RNA sequences.

== Protein ==
QRICH2 protein is 1663 amino acids long, and 10.9% of the amino acids are glutamine (Q). 38% of the QRICH2 protein secondary structure is alpha-helix, 39% is beta-sheet and 13% is turning. The human tissue type with the highest level of QRICH2 expression is testis, and this result is confirmed by the Gene Expression Profile for mouse and dog too. The subcellular location of QRICH2 protein is in the nucleus. QRICH2 is a soluble protein, its average hydrophobicity is -0.5995. QRICH2 protein interact with a number of other proteins including SSSCA1, TSSC1, GAPDH, NUP98 and SNAI1.

== Homology ==
=== paralogs ===
Species	Gene name	Accession (mRNA)	Length (bp)	E-value	Identity	Coverage	Location
Human	FLJ25373	AK058102	1499	0.0	99%	27%	ch7

FLJ25737 mRNA sequences perfectly match with two regions on the QRICH2 mRNA (bp 3157-4302 on QRICH2 match with bp 1-1146 on FLJ25737, bp 4998-5307 on QRICH2 match with bp 1140-1499 on FLJ25737). However, FLJ25737 locates on chromosome 7 and QRICH2 locates on chromosome 17.

Species	Protein name	Accession (protein)	Length (aa)	E-value	Identity	Coverage	Location
Human	Spermine like protein 1	NP_001012998.2	632	6.00e-46	34%	39%	Xq21.1
Human	Protein piccolo isoform 1	NP_149015.2	5142	3.00e-10	30%	33%	7q11.23

=== Orthologs ===
Species	Common name	Divergence (Million years ago)	Accession(Protein)	Length(aa)	Identity	Coverage
Rattus norvegicus	Brown rat	92.3	XP_577148.4	1971	51%	99%
Nomascus leucogenys	Gibbon	20.4	XP_003279182.2	1768	80%	99%
Canis lupus familiaris	Dog	94.2	XP_533125.3	1936	67%	99%
Loxodonta africana	Elephant	98.7	XP_003417424.1	1973	65%	99%
Ailuropoda melanoleuca	Panda	94.2	XP_002919929.1	1903	64%	99%
Otolemur garnettii	Bushbaby	74	XP_003785524.1	1963	63%	99%
Sus scrofa	Boar	94.2	XP_003131230.1	1983	63%	99%
Cavia porcellus	Guinea pig	92.3	XP_003461498	1852	61%	99%
Felis catus	Cat	94.2	XP_003997276.1	1755	61%	98%
Papio anubis	Babbon	29	XP_003913523.1	2043	80%	97%
Gorilla gorilla	Gorilla	8.8	XP_004041087	507	99%	30%
Mus musculus	House mouse	92.3	NP_001028439.1	592	77%	30%

QRICH2 protein has well conserved orthologs in many species. The orthologous protein sequences match very well at the region where the high molecular weight glutenin domain and ATPase involved domain is.

== Function ==
The function of QRICH2 protein is mostly unknown. QRICH2 has been shown to belong to the common expression groups on human chromosome 17. The following genes belonged to the common expression groups on chromosome 17: NCOR1, GFAP, QRICH2, ANAPC11 and PER1. QRICH2 may also be an up-regulated gene involved in cell adhesion and cellular morphogenesis. The high expression of QRICH2 gene in testis may suggest that QRICH2 protein has some functions related to hormone production in males. QRICH2 protein has some sequence similarities with the spermidine/spermine N(1)-acetyl-like protein 1 in several species.
