= Tophus =

- Other names: Harrison syndrome
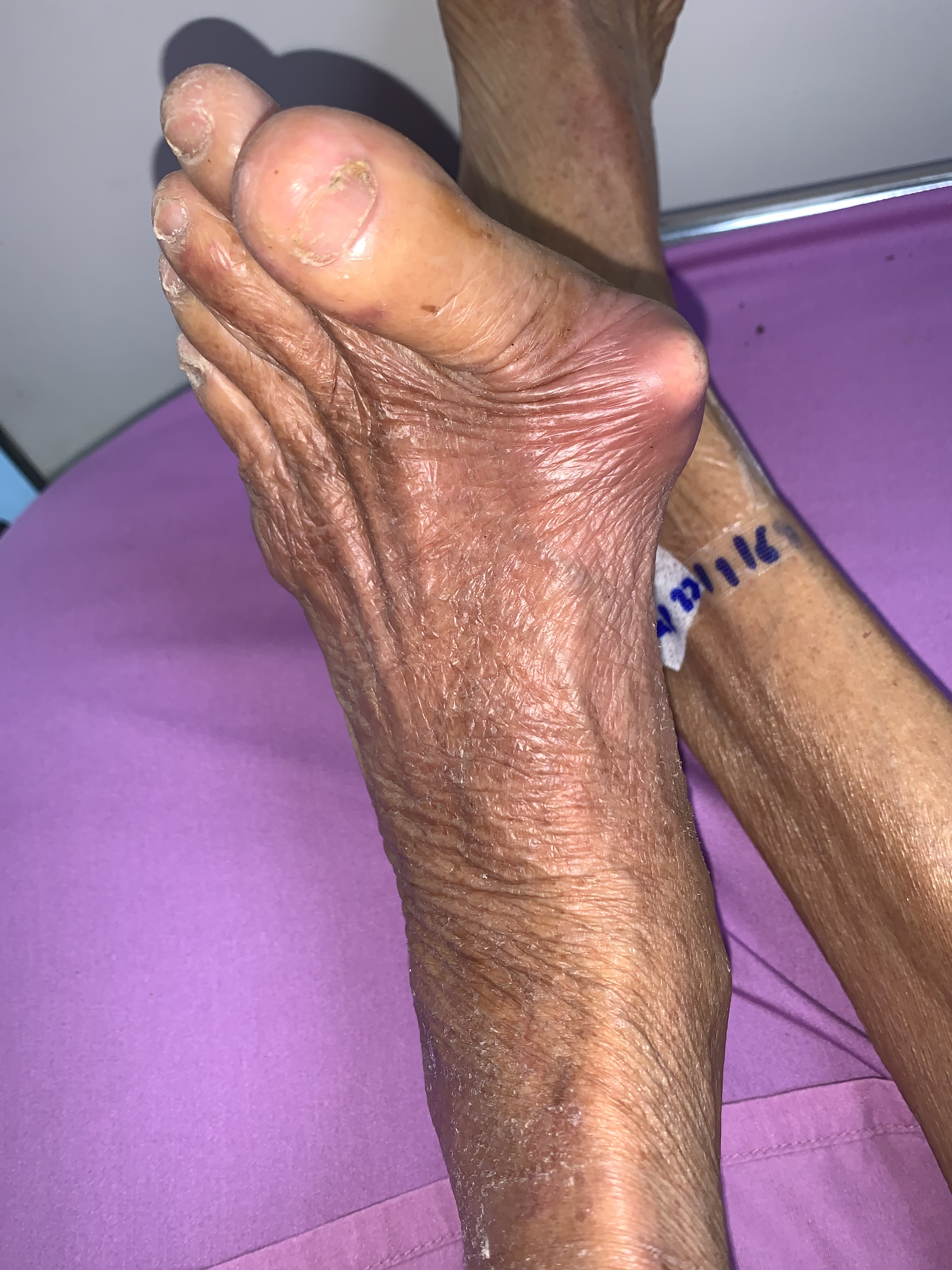
- A tophus on the left metatarsophalangeal joint, causing hallux valgus in a Thai female patient with chronic gouty arthritis
- Causes: Longstanding high hyperuricemia

A tophus (Latin: "stone", pl.: tophi) is a deposit of monosodium urate crystals in people with longstanding high levels of uric acid (urate) in the blood, a condition known as hyperuricemia. Tophi are pathognomonic for the disease gout. Most people with tophi have had previous attacks of acute arthritis, eventually leading to the formation of tophi. Chronic tophaceous gout is known as Harrison syndrome.

Tophi form in the joints, cartilage, bones, and other places throughout the body. Sometimes, tophi break through the skin and appear as white or yellowish-white, chalky nodules. Without treatment, tophi may develop on average about ten years after the onset of gout, although their first appearance can range from three to forty-two years. The development of gouty tophi can also limit joint function and cause bone destruction, leading to noticeable disabilities, especially when gout cannot successfully be treated.

When uric acid levels and gout symptoms cannot be controlled with standard gout medicines that decrease the production of uric acid (e.g., allopurinol, febuxostat) or increase uric acid elimination from the body through the kidneys (e.g., probenecid), this can be referred to as refractory chronic gout (RCG). They are more apt to appear early in the course of the disease in people who are older.

Although less common, tophi can also form in the kidneys and nasal cartilage.

== Pathophysiology ==
It appears that monosodium urate crystals trigger a distinct physiological NETosis pathway that coats them in DNA. These coated crystals then persist in tissues as a foreign body granuloma constituting gouty tophus.

== Gallery ==
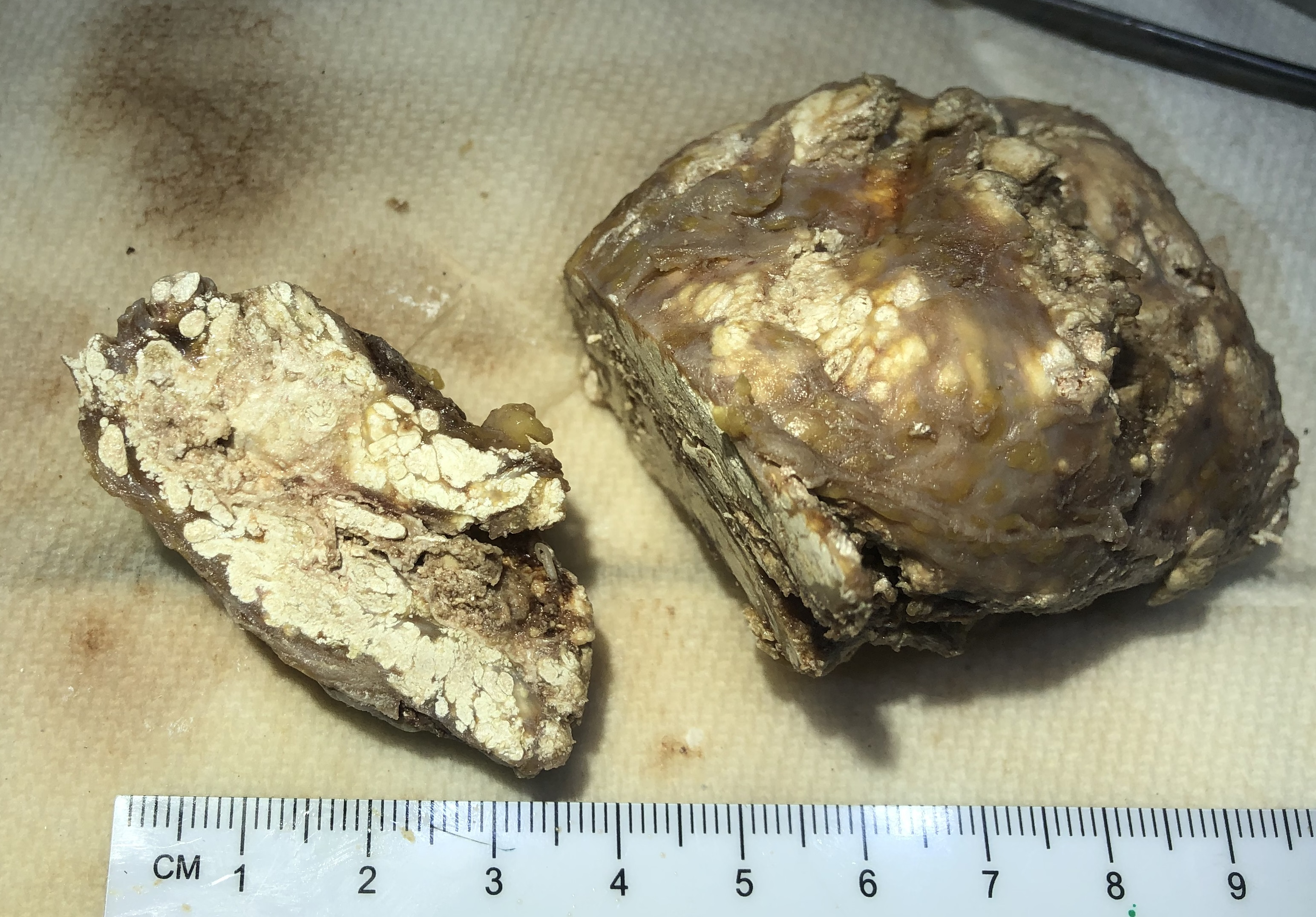
Gross pathology of a large tophus

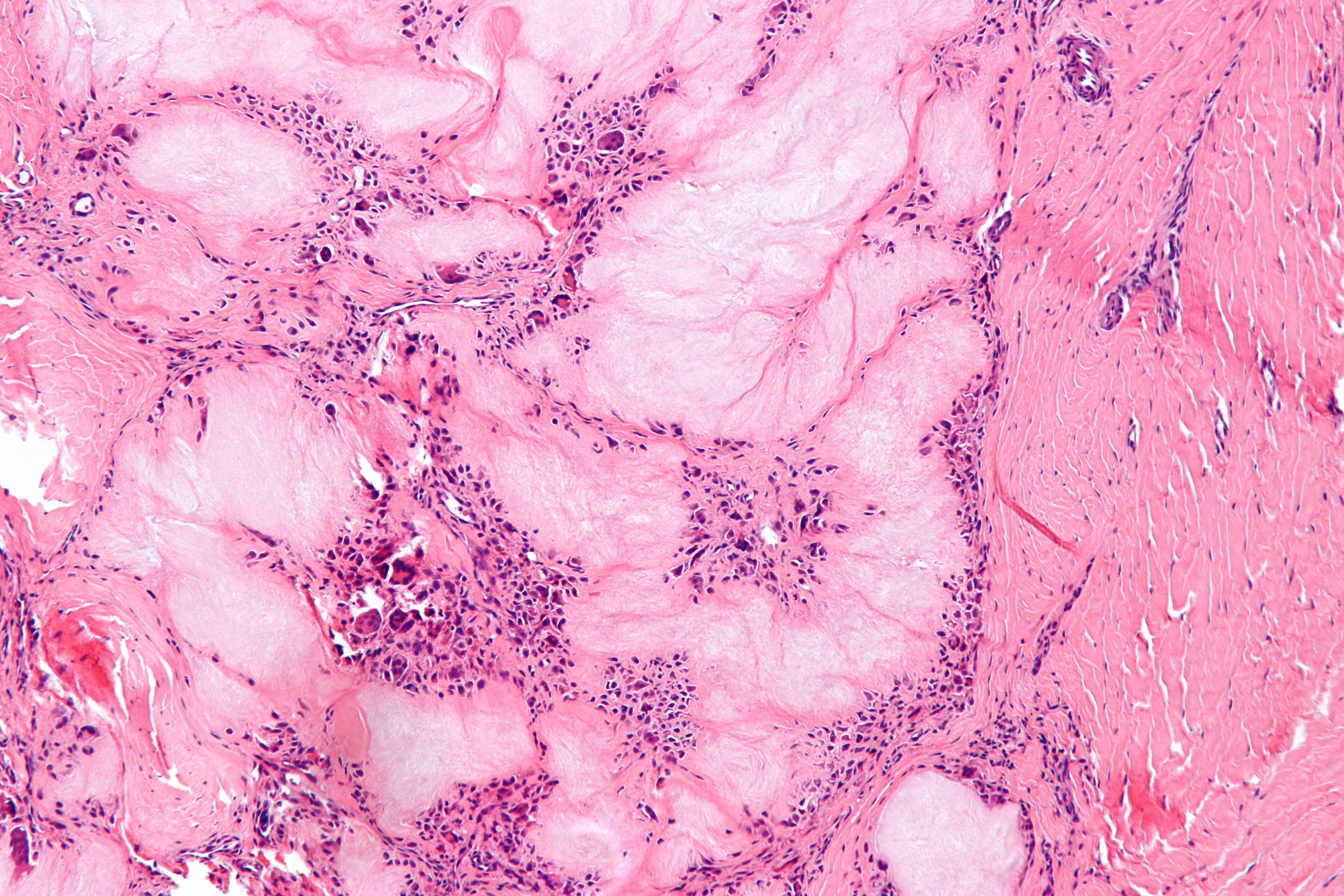
Micrograph of a gouty tophus

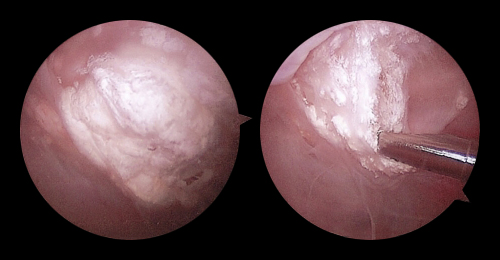
A tophus being removed from inside a knee joint by arthroscopic surgery

Tophus of uric acid crystals from toe joint fluid (100x polarized light)

== See also ==
- Chondrocalcinosis (pseudogout)
