= Gout =

Form of arthritis causing swollen joints

- Other names: Rheumatic gout, podagra
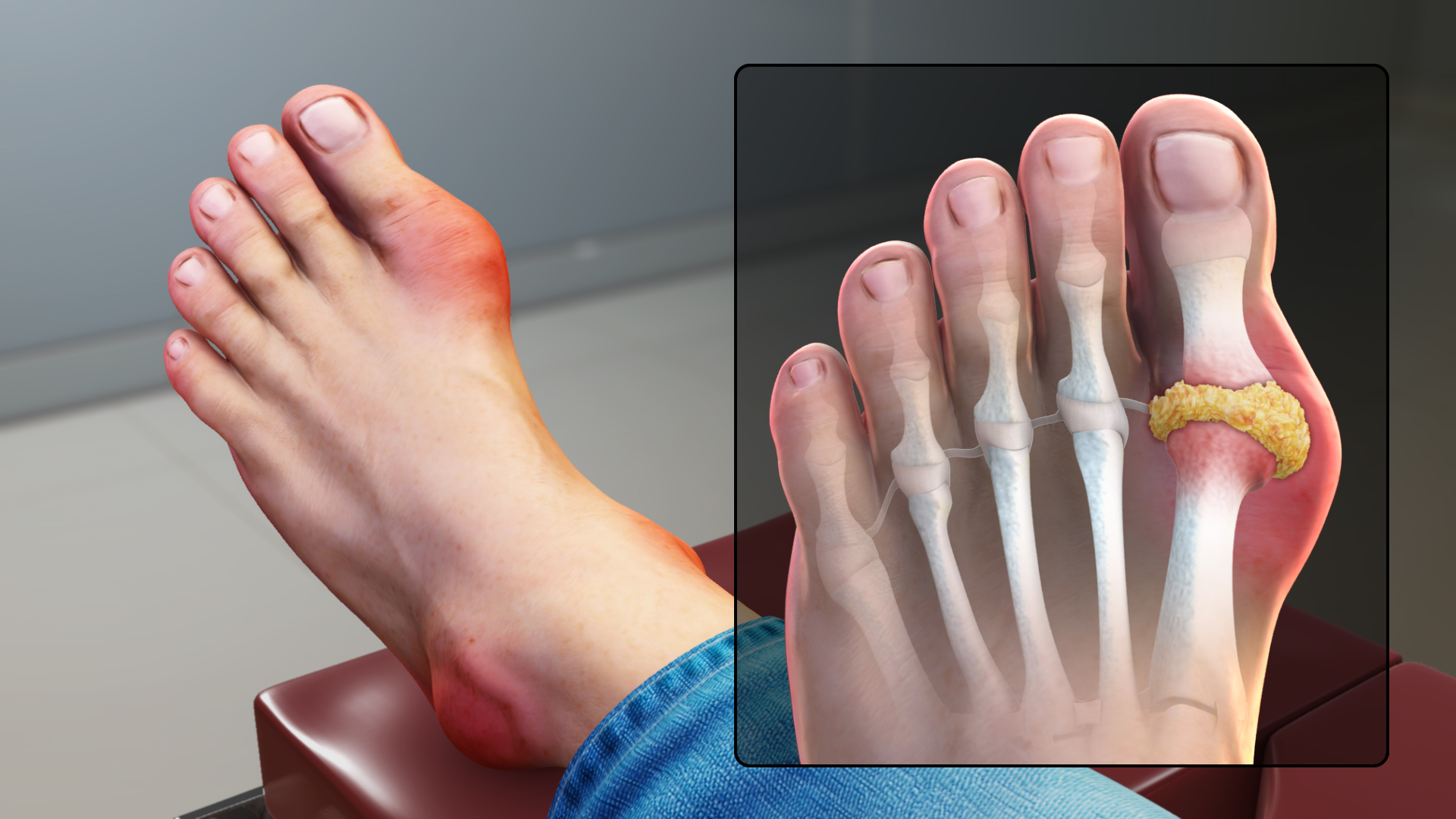
- Medical illustration of the big toe joint affected by gout
- Pronunciation: /ɡaʊt/
- Specialty: Emergency medicine, family medicine
- Symptoms: Joint pain, swelling, and redness
- Usual onset: Older men, postmenopausal women
- Causes: Uric acid
- Risk factors: Diet high in meat or beer, being overweight, genetics
- Differential diagnosis: Joint infection, rheumatoid arthritis, pseudogout
- Prevention: Weight loss, not drinking alcohol, allopurinol
- Treatment: NSAIDs, glucocorticoids, colchicine
- Frequency: 1–5% (developed world)

Gout is a form of joint inflammation characterized by recurrent attacks of a painful, red, tender, hot, and swollen joint. Pain typically comes on rapidly, reaching maximal intensity in less than 12 hours. In about half of cases, the joint at the base of the big toe is affected (podagra). It may also result in tophi, kidney stones, or kidney damage.

It is due to persistently elevated levels of uric acid (urate) in the blood (hyperuricemia). This occurs from a combination of diet, other health problems, and genetic factors. At high levels, uric acid crystallizes and the crystals deposit in joints, tendons, and surrounding tissues, resulting in an attack of gout. Gout occurs more commonly in those who regularly eat meat or seafood, drink beer or sugar-sweetened beverages, or are overweight. Diagnosis may be confirmed by the presence of crystals in the joint fluid or in a deposit outside the joint. Blood uric acid levels may be normal during an attack.

Treatment with nonsteroidal anti-inflammatory drugs (NSAIDs), glucocorticoids, or colchicine improves symptoms. Once the acute attack subsides, levels of uric acid may be lowered by lifestyle changes; in those with frequent attacks, allopurinol or probenecid provides long-term prevention. Taking vitamin C and eating a diet high in low-fat dairy products may be preventive.

Gout affects about 1–5% of adults in the developed world at some point in their lives. It has become more common in recent decades. This is believed to be due to increasing risk factors in the population, such as metabolic syndrome, longer life expectancy, and changes in diet. Older males are most commonly affected. Gout was historically known as "the disease of kings" or "rich man's disease". It has been recognized at least since the time of the ancient Egyptians.

== Signs and symptoms ==
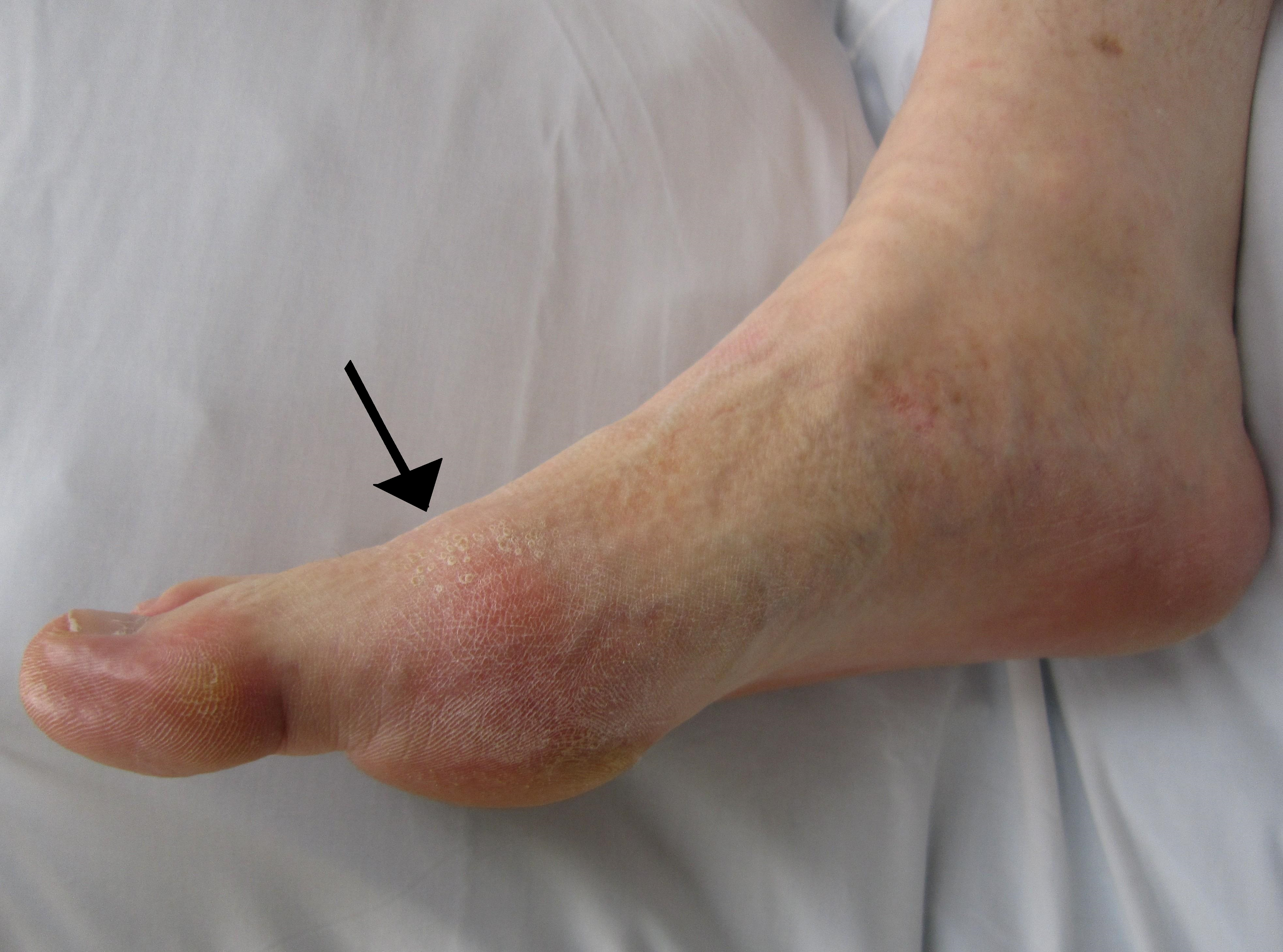
Gout presenting as slight redness in the metatarsophalangeal joint of the big toe

Gout can present in several ways, although the most common is a recurrent attack of acute inflammatory arthritis (a red, tender, hot, swollen joint). The metatarsophalangeal joint at the base of the big toe is affected most often, accounting for half of cases. It can also involve midfoot structures, including the cuneiform bones. Other joints, such as the heels, knees, wrists, and fingers, may also be affected. Joint pain usually begins during the night and peaks within 24 hours of onset. This is mainly due to lower body temperature. Other symptoms may rarely occur along with the joint pain, including fatigue and high fever.

Long-standing elevated levels of uric acid (hyperuricemia) may result in other symptoms, including hard, painless deposits of uric acid crystals called tophi. Extensive tophi may lead to chronic arthritis due to bone erosion. Elevated levels of uric acid may also lead to crystals precipitating in the kidneys, resulting in kidney stone formation and subsequent acute uric acid nephropathy.

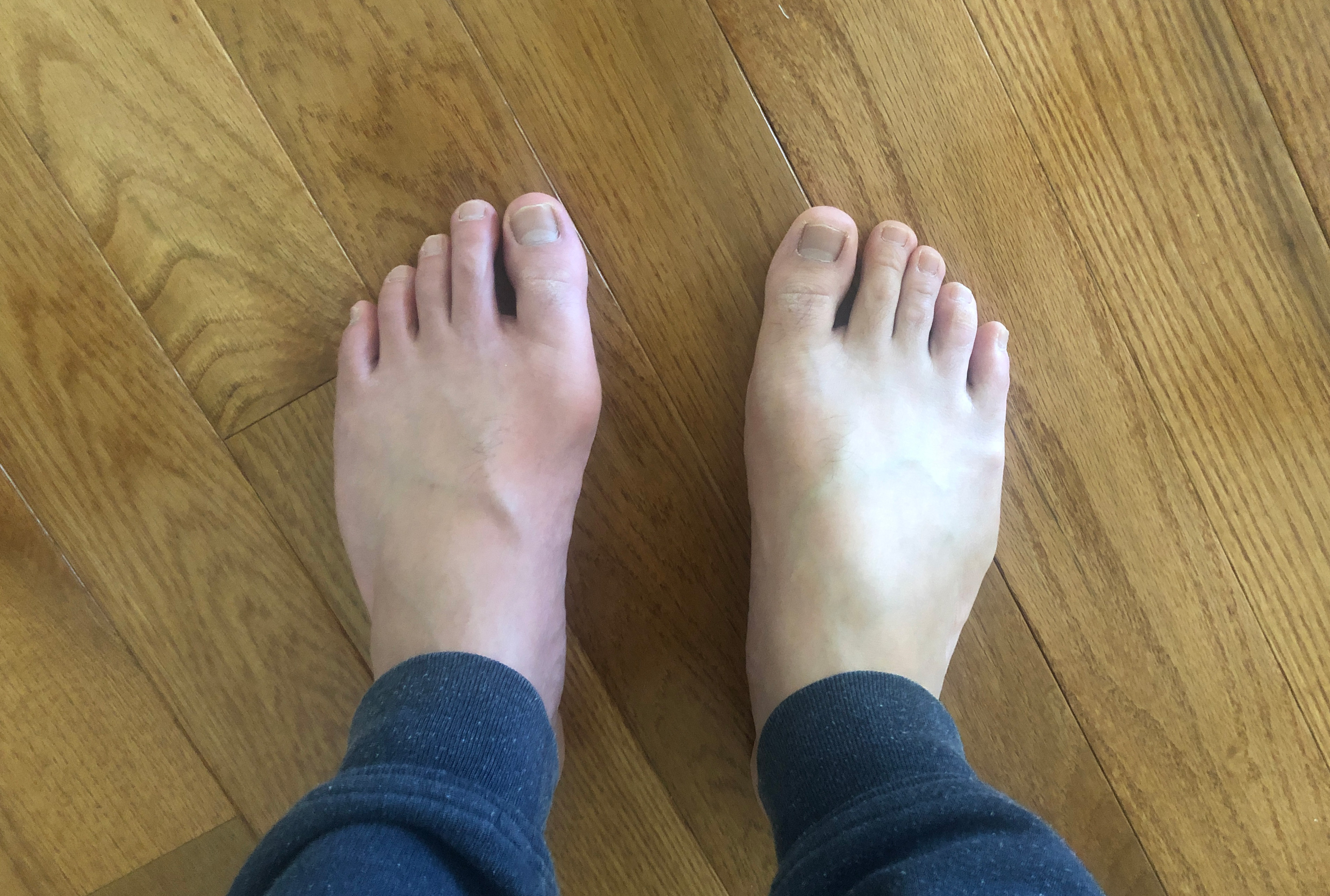
Gout in the big toe of the left foot, compared to the healthy right foot

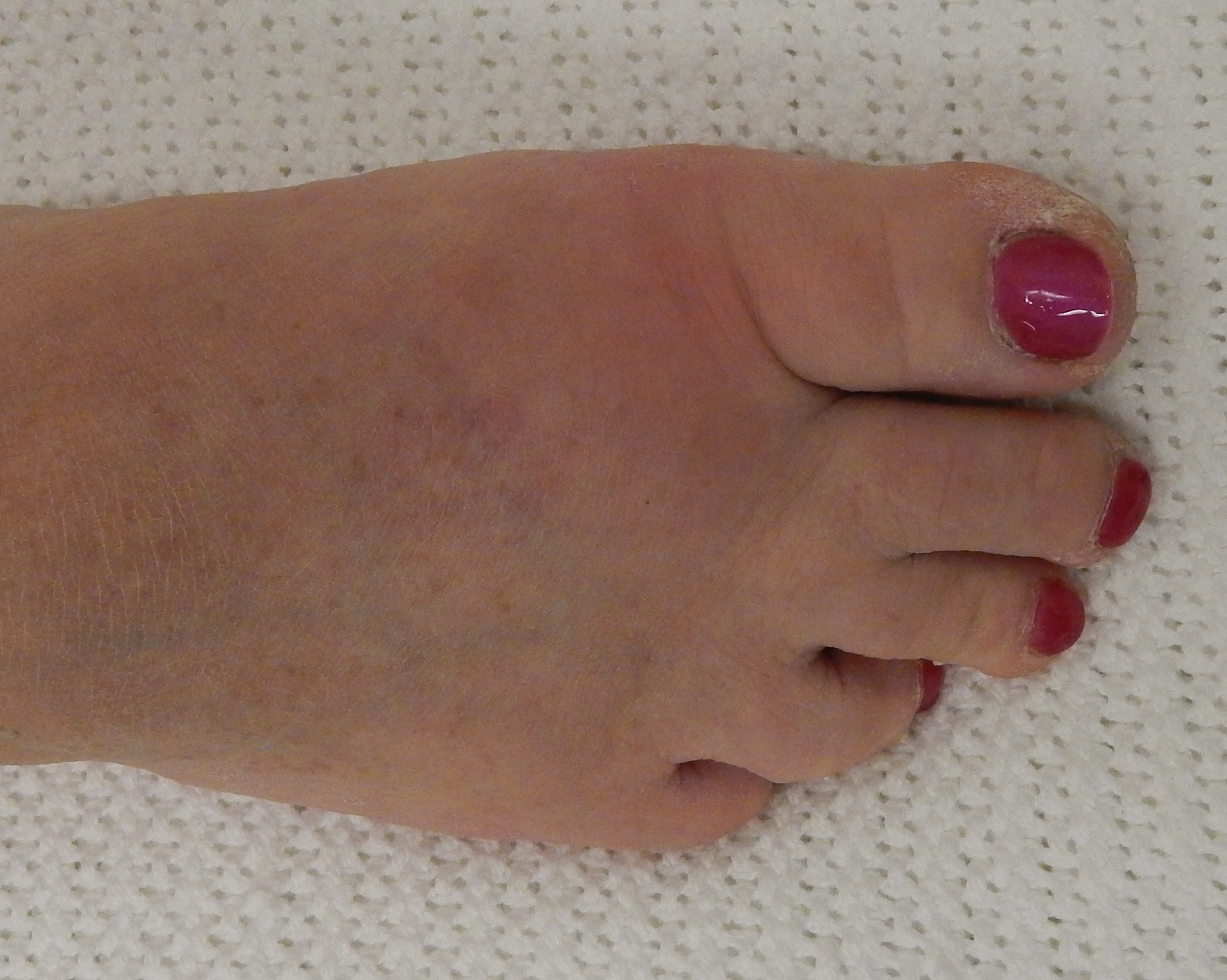
Gout in the joint of the big toe

== Cause ==
The crystallization of uric acid, often related to relatively high levels in the blood, is the underlying cause of gout. This can occur because of diet, genetic predisposition, or underexcretion of urate, the salts of uric acid. Underexcretion of uric acid by the kidney is the primary cause of hyperuricemia in about 90% of cases, while overproduction is the cause in less than 10%. About 10% of people with hyperuricemia develop gout at some point in their lifetimes. The risk, however, varies depending on the degree of hyperuricemia. When levels are between 415 and 530 μmol/L (7 and 8.9 mg/dL), the risk is 0.5% per year, while in those with a level greater than 535 μmol/L (9 mg/dL), the risk is 4.5% per year.

=== Lifestyle ===
Dietary causes account for about 12% of gout. In particular the consumption of alcohol, sugar-sweetened beverages, as well as meat and seafood contribute to gout. The dietary mechanisms and nutritional basis involved in gout provide evidence for strategies of prevention and improvement of gout, and dietary modifications based on effective regulatory mechanisms may be a promising strategy to reduce the high prevalence of gout. Among foods richest in purines yielding high amounts of uric acid are dried anchovies, shrimp, organ meat, dried mushrooms, seaweed, and beer yeast. Chicken and potatoes also appear related. Other triggers include physical trauma and surgery.

Studies in the early 2000s found that other dietary factors are not relevant. Specifically, a diet with moderate purine-rich vegetables (e.g., beans, peas, lentils, and spinach) is not associated with gout. Neither is total dietary protein. Alcohol consumption is strongly associated with increased risk, with wine presenting somewhat less of a risk than beer or spirits. Eating skim milk powder enriched with glycomacropeptide (GMP) and G600 milk fat extract may reduce pain but may result in diarrhea and nausea.

Physical fitness, healthy weight, low-fat dairy products, and to a lesser extent, coffee and taking vitamin C, appear to decrease the risk of gout; however, taking vitamin C supplements does not appear to have a significant effect in people who already have established gout. Peanuts, brown bread, and fruit also appear protective. This is believed to be partly due to their effect in reducing insulin resistance.

Other than dietary and lifestyle choices, the recurrence of gout attacks is also linked to the weather. High ambient temperature and low relative humidity may increase the risk of a gout attack.

=== Genetics ===
Gout is partly genetic, contributing to about 60% of variability in uric acid level. The SLC2A9, SLC22A12, and ABCG2 genes are commonly associated with gout and variations in them can approximately double the risk. Loss-of-function mutations in SLC2A9 and SLC22A12 causes low blood uric acid levels by reducing urate absorption and unopposed urate secretion. The rare genetic disorders familial juvenile hyperuricemic nephropathy, medullary cystic kidney disease, phosphoribosylpyrophosphate synthetase superactivity and hypoxanthine-guanine phosphoribosyltransferase deficiency as seen in Lesch–Nyhan syndrome, are complicated by gout.

=== Medical conditions ===
Gout frequently occurs in combination with other medical problems. Metabolic syndrome, a combination of abdominal obesity, hypertension, insulin resistance, and abnormal lipid levels, occurs in nearly 75% of cases. Other conditions commonly complicated by gout include lead poisoning, kidney failure, hemolytic anemia, psoriasis, solid organ transplants, and myeloproliferative disorders such as polycythemia. A body mass index greater than or equal to 35 increases male risk of gout threefold. Chronic lead exposure and lead-contaminated alcohol are risk factors for gout due to the harmful effect of lead on kidney function.

=== Medication ===
Diuretics have been associated with attacks of gout, but a low dose of hydrochlorothiazide does not seem to increase risk. Other medications that increase the risk include niacin, aspirin (acetylsalicylic acid), ACE inhibitors, angiotensin receptor blockers, beta blockers, ritonavir, and pyrazinamide. The immunosuppressive drugs ciclosporin and tacrolimus are also associated with gout, the former more so when used in combination with hydrochlorothiazide.

== Pathophysiology ==
Chemical structure of uric acid

Gout is a disorder of purine metabolism, and occurs when its final metabolite, uric acid, crystallizes in the form of monosodium urate, precipitating and forming deposits (tophi) in joints, on tendons, and in the surrounding tissues. Microscopic tophi may be walled off by a ring of proteins, which blocks interaction of the crystals with cells and therefore avoids inflammation. Naked crystals may break out of walled-off tophi due to minor physical damage to the joint, medical or surgical stress, or rapid changes in uric acid levels. When they break through the tophi, they trigger a local immune-mediated inflammatory reaction in macrophages, which is initiated by the NLRP3 inflammasome protein complex. Activation of the NLRP3 inflammasome recruits the enzyme caspase 1, which converts pro-interleukin 1β into active interleukin 1β, one of the key proteins in the inflammatory cascade. An evolutionary loss of urate oxidase (uricase), which breaks down uric acid, in humans and higher primates has made this condition common.

The triggers for the precipitation of uric acid are not well understood. While it may crystallize at normal levels, it is more likely to do so as levels increase. Other triggers believed to be important in acute episodes of arthritis include cool temperatures, rapid changes in uric acid levels, acidosis, articular hydration and extracellular matrix proteins. The increased precipitation at low temperatures partly explains why the joints in the feet are most commonly affected. Rapid changes in uric acid may occur due to factors including trauma, surgery, chemotherapy and diuretics. The starting or increasing of urate-lowering medications can lead to an acute attack of gout with febuxostat of a particularly high risk. Calcium channel blockers and losartan are associated with a lower risk of gout compared to other medications for hypertension.

== Diagnosis ==
Synovial fluid examination
Type	WBC (per mm^{3})	% neutrophils	Viscosity	Appearance
Normal	<200	0	High	Transparent
Osteoarthritis	<5000	<25	High	Clear yellow
Trauma	<10,000	<50	Variable	Bloody
Inflammatory	2,000–50,000	50–80	Low	Cloudy yellow
Septic arthritis	>50,000	>75	Low	Cloudy yellow
Gonorrhea	~10,000	60	Low	Cloudy yellow
Tuberculosis	~20,000	70	Low	Cloudy yellow
Inflammatory: Gout, rheumatoid arthritis, rheumatic fever

Gout may be diagnosed and treated without further investigations in someone with hyperuricemia and the classic acute arthritis of the base of the great toe (known as podagra). Synovial fluid analysis should be done if the diagnosis is in doubt. Plain X-rays are usually normal and are not useful for confirming a diagnosis of early gout. They may show signs of chronic gout, such as bone erosion.

=== Synovial fluid ===
A definitive diagnosis of gout is based upon the identification of monosodium urate crystals in synovial fluid or a tophus. All synovial fluid samples obtained from undiagnosed inflamed joints by arthrocentesis should be examined for these crystals. Under polarized light microscopy, they have a needle-like morphology and strong negative birefringence. This test is difficult to perform and requires a trained observer. The fluid must be examined relatively soon after aspiration, as temperature and pH affect solubility.

=== Blood tests ===
Hyperuricemia is a classic feature of gout, but nearly half of the time gout occurs without hyperuricemia and most people with raised uric acid levels never develop gout. Thus, the diagnostic utility of measuring uric acid levels is limited. Hyperuricemia is defined as a plasma urate level greater than 420 μmol/L (7.0 mg/dL) in males and 360 μmol/L (6.0 mg/dL) in females. Other blood tests commonly performed are white blood cell count, electrolytes, kidney function and erythrocyte sedimentation rate (ESR). However, both the white blood cells and ESR may be elevated due to gout in the absence of infection. A white blood cell count as high as 40.0×10^{9}/l (40,000/mm^{3}) has been documented.

=== Differential diagnosis ===
The most important differential diagnosis in gout is septic arthritis. This should be considered in those with signs of infection or those who do not improve with treatment. To help with diagnosis, a synovial fluid Gram stain and culture may be performed. Other conditions that can look similar include CPPD (pseudogout), rheumatoid arthritis, psoriatic arthritis, palindromic rheumatism, and reactive arthritis. Gouty tophi, in particular when not located in a joint, can be mistaken for basal cell carcinoma or other neoplasms.

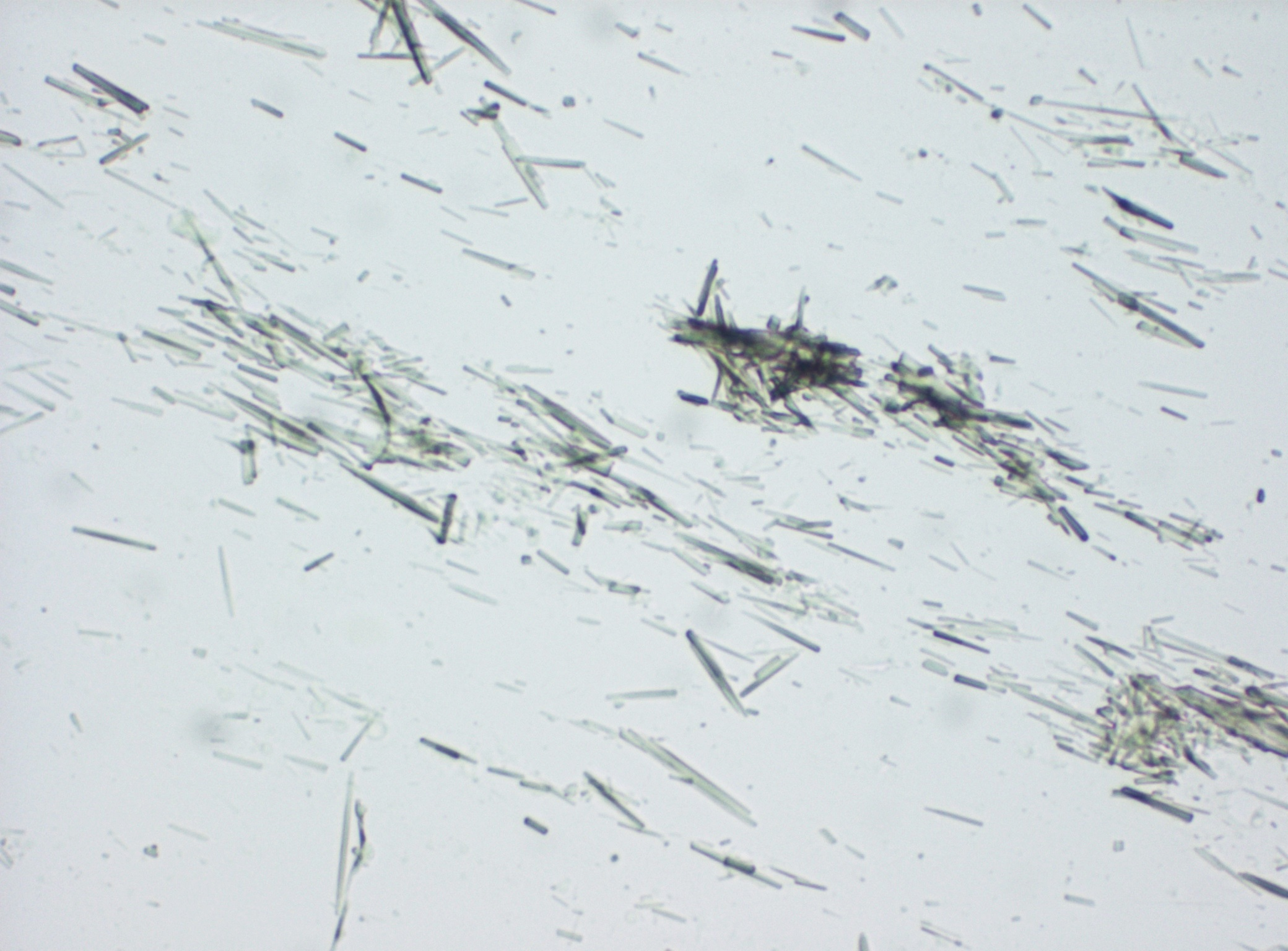
Light microscopy of a touch preparation of a gout tophus, showing needle-shaped crystals.

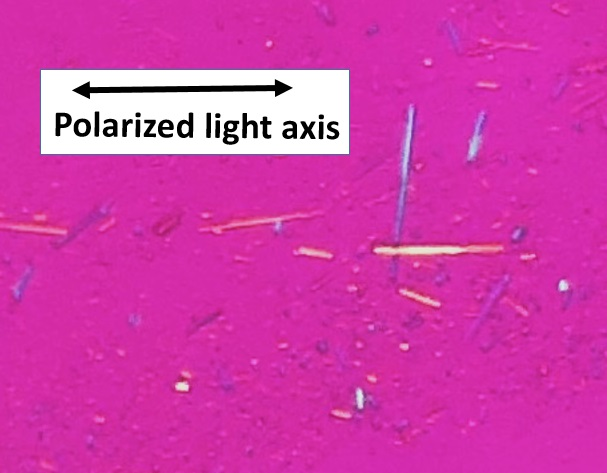
Uric acid crystals in polarized light, showing negative birefringence, with yellow color when aligned parallel to the axis of the red compensator, and blue when aligned perpendicularly to it.

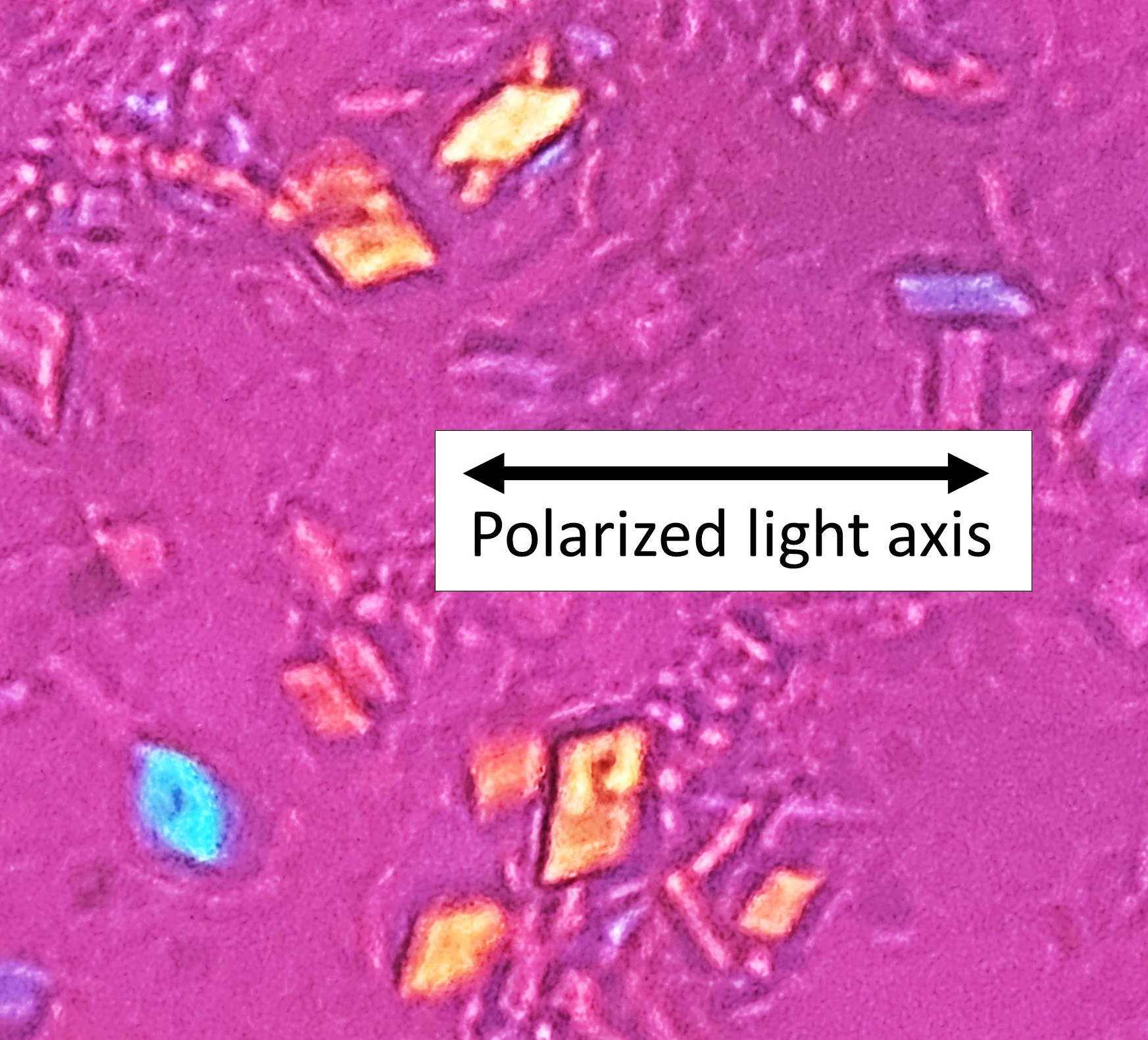
In contrast, CPPD (pseudogout) displays rhombus-shaped crystals with positive birefringence.

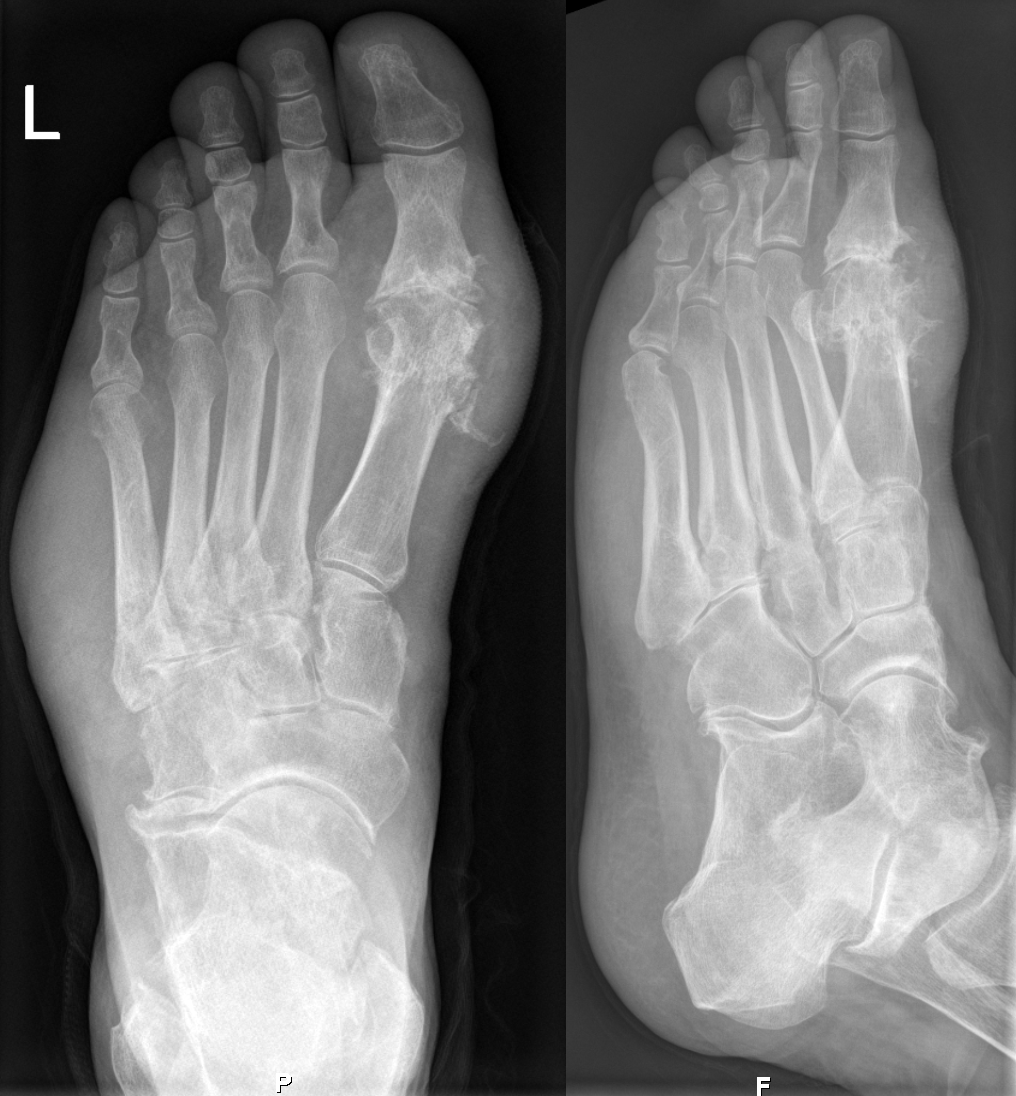
Gout on X-rays of a left foot in the metatarsal-phalangeal joint of the big toe. Note also the soft tissue swelling at the lateral border of the foot.

== Prevention ==
Risk of gout attacks can be lowered by complete abstinence from drinking alcoholic beverages, reducing the intake of fructose (e.g., sucrose and high fructose corn syrup), and purine-rich foods of animal origin, such as organ meats and seafood. Eating dairy products, vitamin C-rich foods, coffee, and cherries may help prevent gout attacks, as does losing weight. Gout may be secondary to sleep apnea via the release of purines from oxygen-starved cells. Treatment of apnea can lessen the occurrence of attacks.

=== Medications ===
As of 2020, allopurinol is generally the recommended preventive treatment if medications are used. A number of other medications may occasionally be considered to prevent further episodes of gout, including probenecid, febuxostat, benzbromarone, and colchicine. Long term medications are not recommended until a person has had two attacks of gout, unless destructive joint changes, tophi, or urate nephropathy exist. It is not until this point that medications are cost-effective. They are not usually started until one to two weeks after an acute flare has resolved, due to theoretical concerns of worsening the attack. They are often used in combination with either an NSAID or colchicine for the first three to six months.

While it has been recommended that urate-lowering measures should be increased until serum uric acid levels are below 300–360 μmol/L (5.0–6.0 mg/dL), there is little evidence to support this practice over simply putting people on a standard dose of allopurinol. If these medications are in chronic use at the time of an attack, it is recommended that they be continued. Levels that cannot be brought below 6.0 mg/dL while attacks continue indicates refractory gout.

While historically it is not recommended to start allopurinol during an acute attack of gout, this practice appears acceptable. Allopurinol blocks uric acid production, and is the most commonly used agent. Long term therapy is safe and well-tolerated and can be used in people with renal impairment or urate stones, although hypersensitivity occurs in a small number of individuals. The HLA-B*58:01 allele of the human leukocyte antigen B (HLA-B) is strongly associated with severe cutaneous adverse reactions during treatment with allopurinol and is most common among Asian subpopulations, notably those of Korean, Han-Chinese, or Thai descent.

Febuxostat is only recommended in those who cannot tolerate allopurinol. There are concerns about more deaths with febuxostat compared to allopurinol. Febuxostat may also increase the rate of gout flares during early treatment. However, there is tentative evidence that febuxostat may bring down urate levels more than allopurinol.

Probenecid appears to be less effective than allopurinol and is a second-line agent. Probenecid may be used if undersecretion of uric acid is present (24-hour urine uric acid less than 800 mg). It is, however, not recommended if a person has a history of kidney stones. Probenecid can be used in a combined therapy with allopurinol is more effective than allopurinol monotherapy.

Pegloticase is an option for the 3% of people who are intolerant to other medications. It is a third line agent. Pegloticase is given as an intravenous infusion every two weeks, and reduces uric acid levels. Pegloticase is useful decreasing tophi but has a high rate of side effects and many people develop resistance to it. Using lesinurad 400 mg plus febuxostat is more beneficial for tophi resolution than lesinural 200 mL with febuxostat, with similar side effects. Lesinural plus allopurinol is not effective for tophi resolution. Potential side effects include kidney stones, anemia and joint pain. In 2016, it was withdrawn from the European market.

Lesinurad reduces blood uric acid levels by preventing uric acid absorption in the kidneys. It was approved in the United States for use together with allopurinol, among those who were unable to reach their uric acid level targets. Side effects include kidney problems and kidney stones.

== Treatment ==
The initial aim of treatment is to settle the symptoms of an acute attack.

Options for acute treatment include nonsteroidal anti-inflammatory drugs (NSAIDs), colchicine, and glucocorticoids. While glucocorticoids and NSAIDs work equally well, glucocorticoids may be safer.

Repeated attacks can be prevented by medications that reduce serum uric acid levels. Options for prevention include allopurinol, febuxostat, and probenecid. Lowering uric acid levels can cure the disease.

=== NSAIDs ===
NSAIDs (Non-steroidal anti-inflammatory drugs) such as ibuprofen or naproxen can be used to treat the acute pain and to reduce swelling caused by gout. No specific agent is significantly more or less effective than any other. Improvement may be seen within four hours, and treatment is recommended for one to two weeks. They are not recommended for those with certain other health problems, such as gastrointestinal bleeding, kidney failure, or heart failure. While indometacin has historically been the most commonly used NSAID, an alternative, such as ibuprofen, may be preferred due to its better side effect profile in the absence of superior effectiveness. For those at risk of gastric side effects from NSAIDs, an additional proton pump inhibitor may be given. There is some evidence that COX-2 inhibitors may work as well as nonselective NSAIDs for acute gout attack with fewer side effects.

=== Colchicine ===
Colchicine is an alternative for those unable to tolerate NSAIDs. At high doses, side effects (primarily gastrointestinal upset) limit its usage. At lower doses, which are still effective, it is well tolerated. Colchicine may interact with other commonly prescribed drugs, such as atorvastatin and erythromycin, among others.

=== Glucocorticoids ===
Glucocorticoids have been found to be as effective as NSAIDs and may be used if contraindications exist for NSAIDs. They also lead to improvement when injected into the joint. A joint infection must be excluded, however, as glucocorticoids worsen this condition. There were no short-term adverse effects reported.

=== Others ===
Interleukin-1 inhibitors, such as canakinumab, showed moderate effectiveness for pain relief and reduction of joint swelling, but have increased risk of adverse events, such as back pain, headache, and increased blood pressure. They, however, may work less well than usual doses of NSAIDS. The high cost of this class of drugs may also discourage their use for treating gout.

== Prognosis ==
Without treatment, an acute attack of gout usually resolves in five to seven days; however, 60% of people have a second attack within one year. Those with gout are at increased risk of hypertension, diabetes mellitus, metabolic syndrome, and kidney and cardiovascular disease; thus, they are at increased risk of death. It is unclear whether medications that lower urate affect cardiovascular disease risks. This may be partly due to its association with insulin resistance and obesity, but some of the increased risk appears to be independent.

Without treatment, episodes of acute gout may develop into chronic gout with destruction of joint surfaces, joint deformity, and painless tophi. These tophi occur in 30% of those who are untreated for five years, often in the helix of the ear, over the olecranon processes, or on the Achilles tendons. With aggressive treatment, they may dissolve. Kidney stones also frequently complicate gout, affecting between 10 and 40% of people, and occur due to low urine pH, promoting the precipitation of uric acid. Other forms of chronic kidney dysfunction may occur.

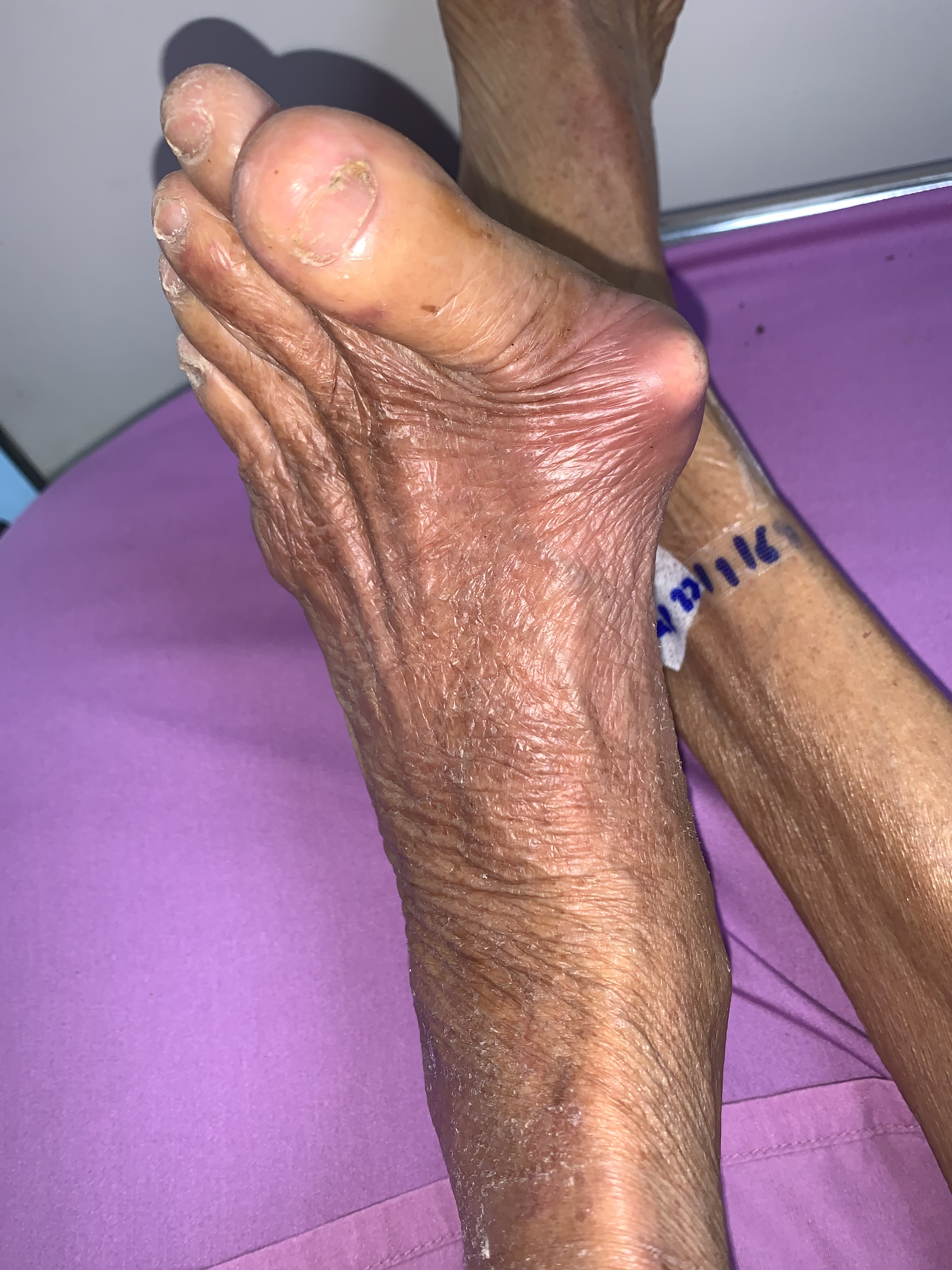
Gouty tophus of the left metatarsophalangeal joint, causing hallux valgus

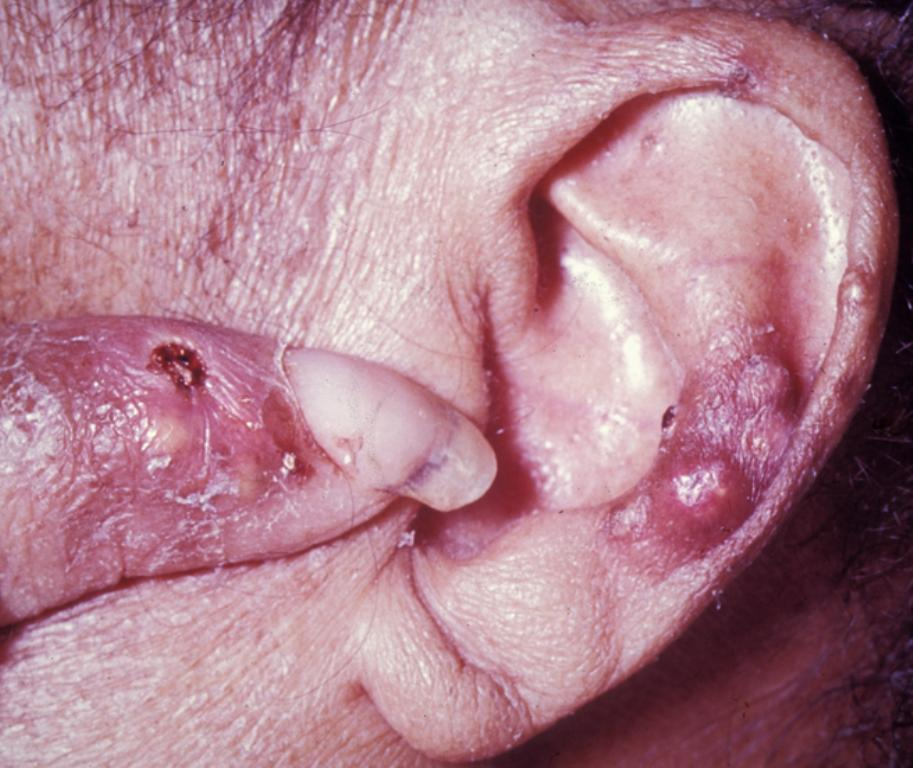
Gouty tophi presenting as nodules on the finger and helix of the ear

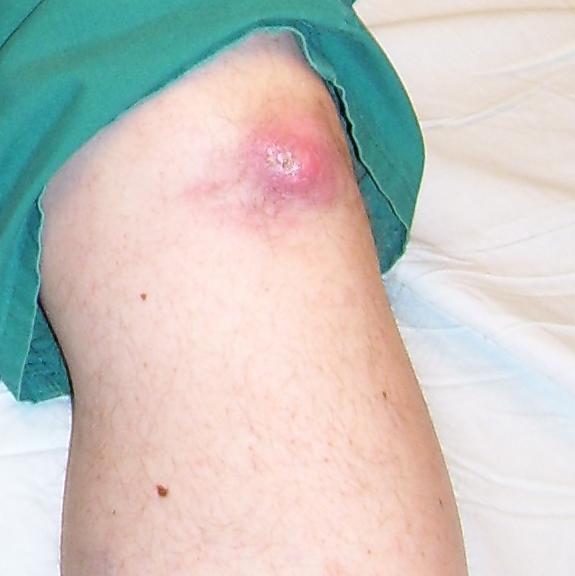
Tophus of the knee

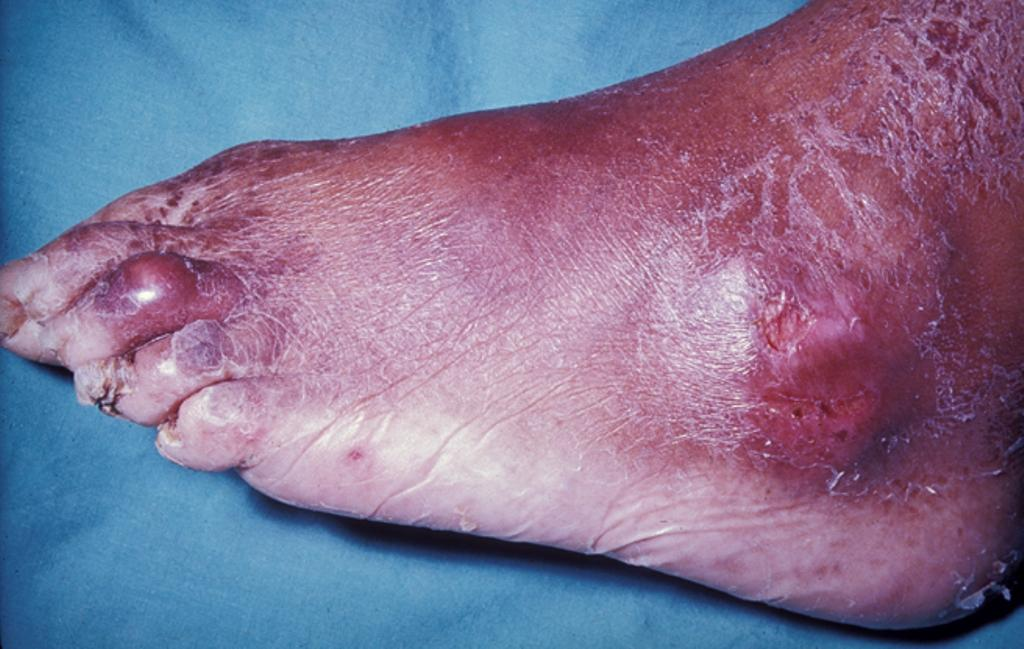
Tophi on the toe and ankle

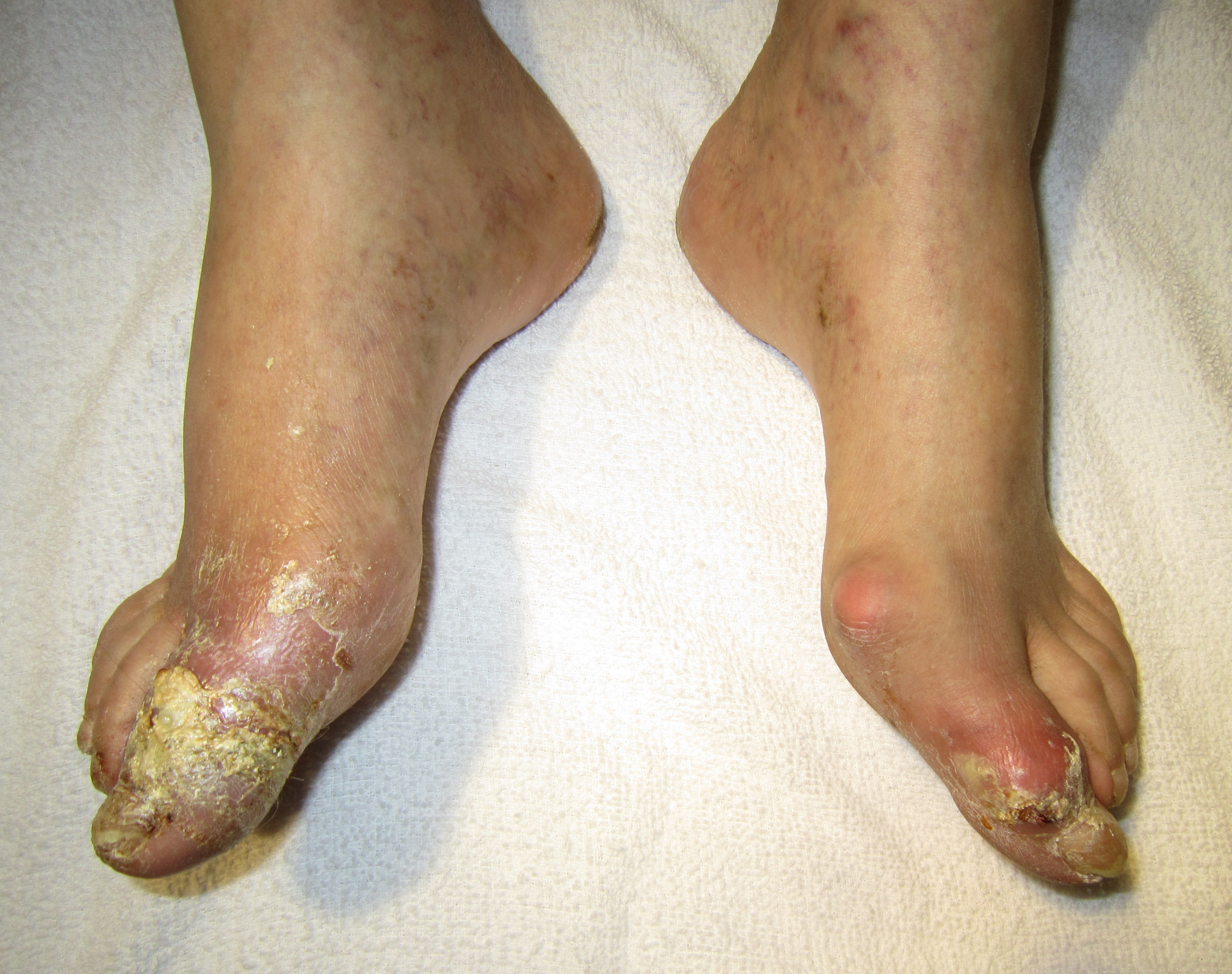
Gout complicated by ruptured tophi, the exudate of which tested positive for uric acid crystals

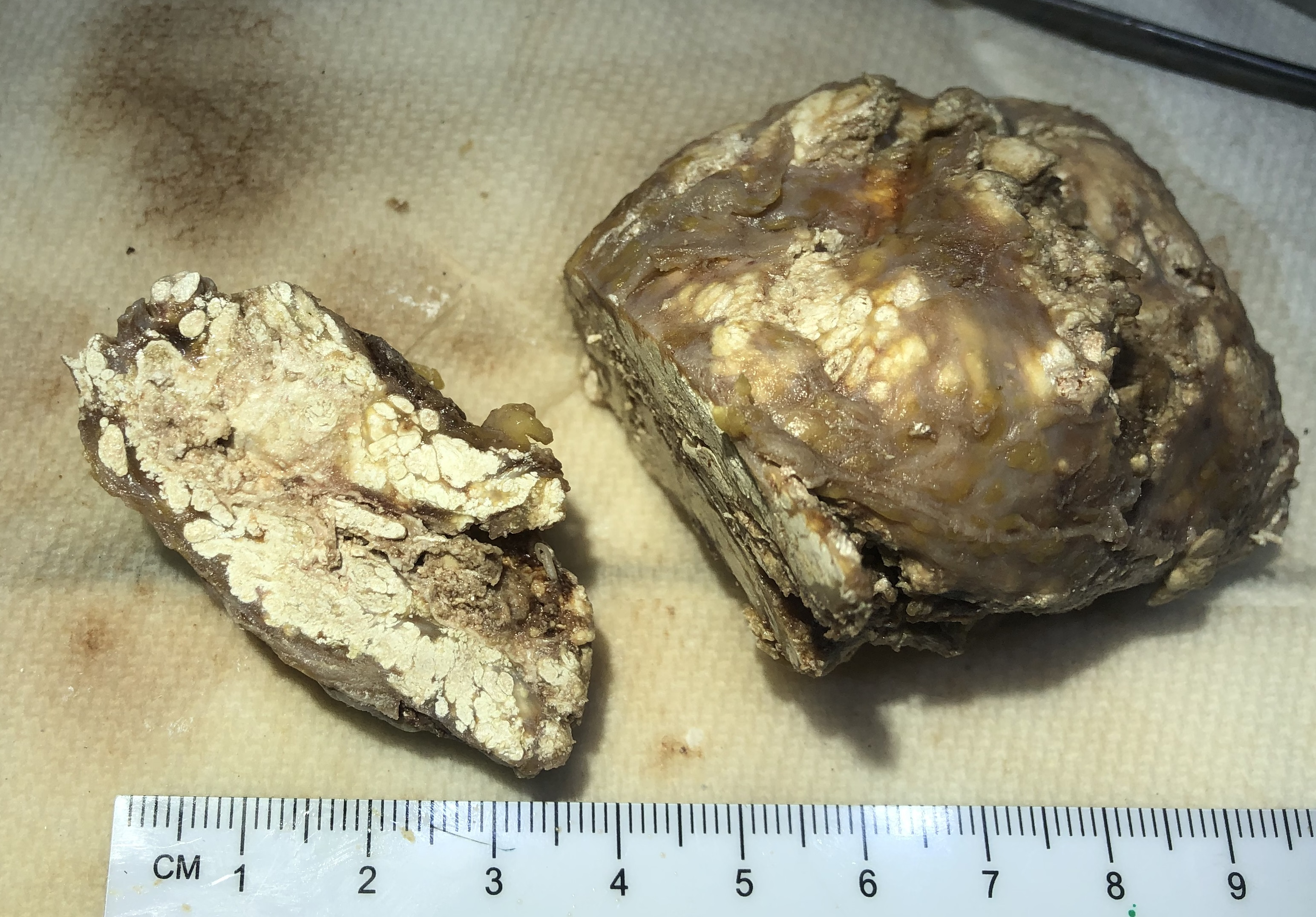
Gross pathology of a large tophus

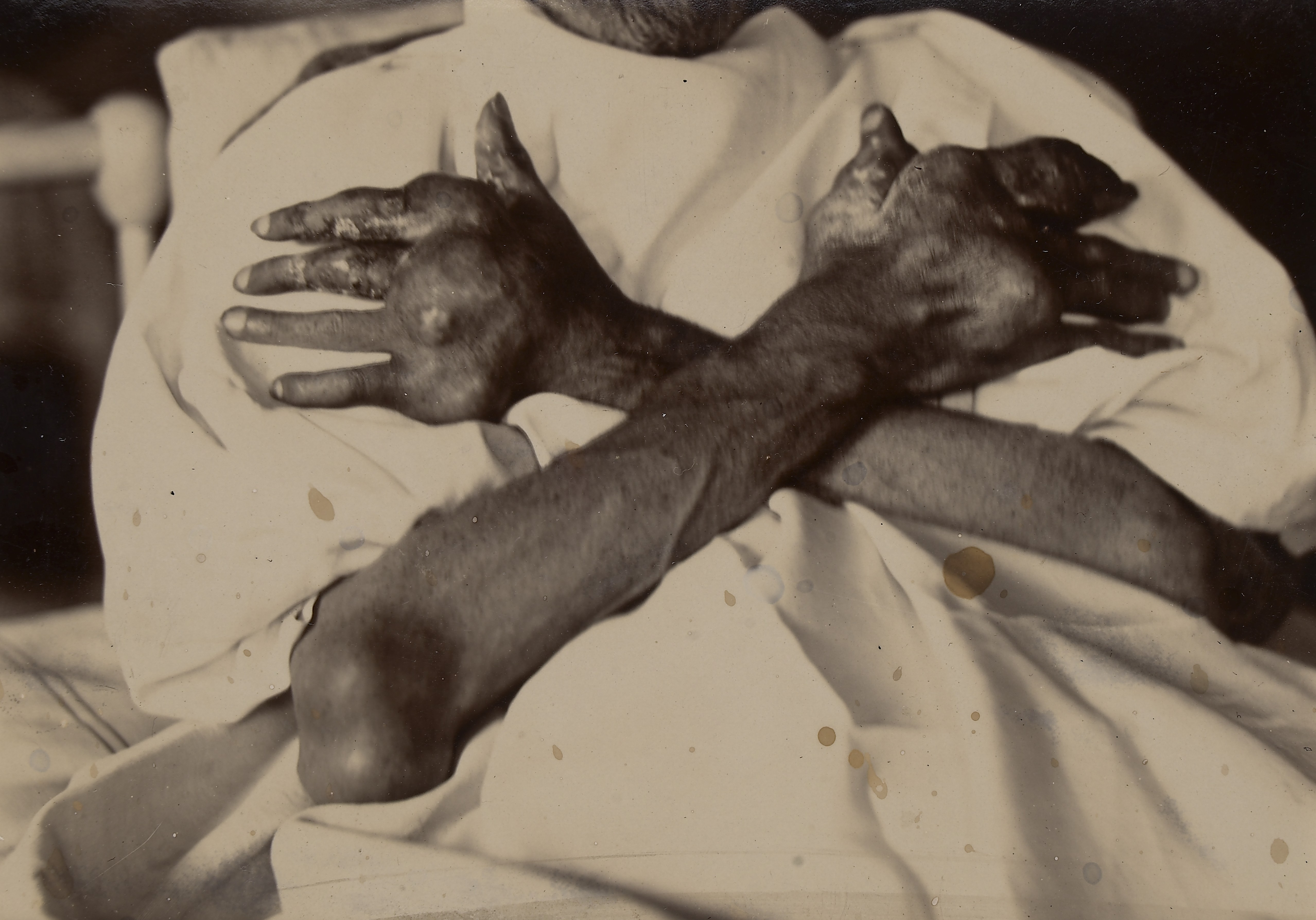
Arms and hands of a 50-year-old man, showing large tophi of sodium urate affecting the elbow, knuckles, and finger joints.

== Epidemiology ==
Gout affects around 1–2% of people in the Western world at some point in their lifetimes and is becoming more common. Some 5.8 million people were affected in 2013. Rates of gout approximately doubled between 1990 and 2010. This rise is believed to be due to increasing life expectancy, changes in diet, and an increase in diseases associated with gout, such as metabolic syndrome and high blood pressure. Factors that influence rates of gout include age, race, and the season of the year. In men over 30 and women over 50, the rates are 2%.

In the United States, gout is twice as likely in males of African descent than those of European descent. Rates are high among Polynesians; however, the disease is rare in aboriginal Australians, despite a higher mean uric acid serum concentration in the latter group. It has become common in China, Polynesia, and urban Sub-Saharan Africa. Some studies found that attacks of gout occur more frequently in the spring. This has been attributed to seasonal changes in diet, alcohol consumption, physical activity, and temperature.

Taiwan, Hong Kong, and Singapore have a relatively higher prevalence of gout. A study based on the National Health Insurance Research Database (NHIRD) estimated that 4.92% of Taiwanese residents had gout in 2004. A survey held by the Hong Kong government found that 5.1% of Hong Kong residents between 45 and 59 years and 6.1% of those older than 60 years have gout. A 2015 study held in Singapore found that 2,117 out of 52,322 people between 45 and 74 years had gout, roughly equal to 4.1%.

== History ==
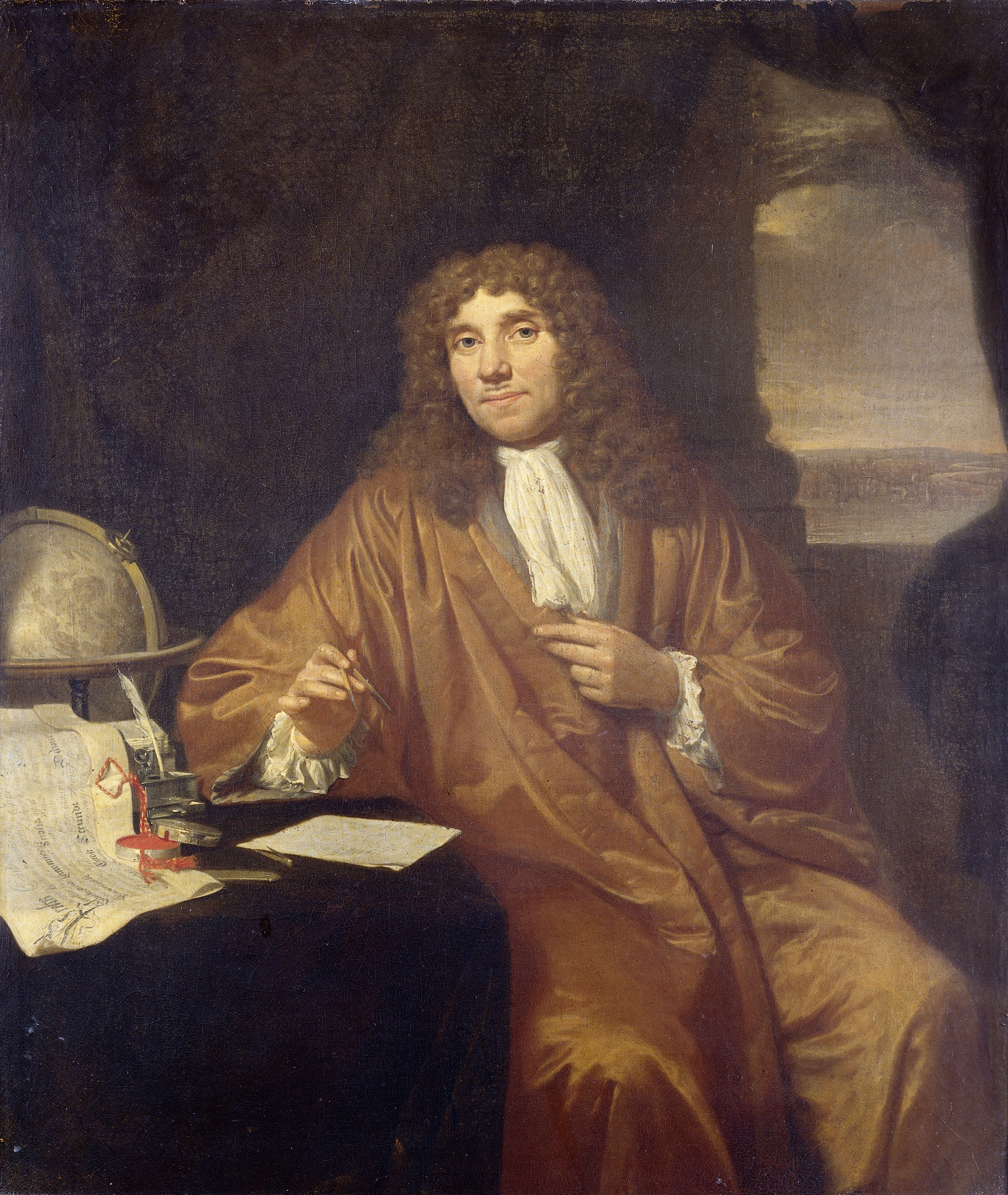
Antonie van Leeuwenhoek described the microscopic appearance of uric acid crystals in 1679.

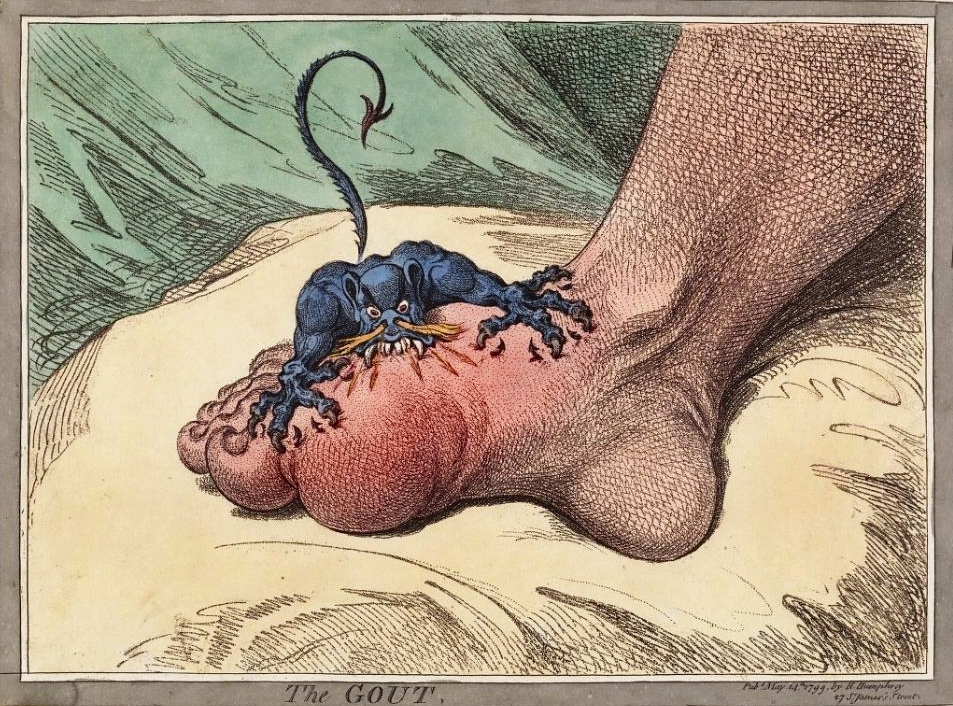
The gout by James Gillray, 1799

The English term "gout" first occurs in the work of Randolphus of Bocking, around 1200 AD. It derives from the Latin word gutta, meaning "a drop" (of liquid). According to the Oxford English Dictionary, this originates from humorism and "the notion of the 'dropping' of a morbid material from the blood in and around the joints".

Gout has been known since antiquity. Historically, wits have referred to it as "the king of diseases and the disease of kings" or as "rich man's disease" for its relationship to a rich diet and obesity. The Ebers papyrus and the Edwin Smith papyrus, (c. 1550 BC) each mention arthritis of the first metacarpophalangeal joint as a distinct type of arthritis. These ancient manuscripts cite (now missing) Egyptian texts about gout that are claimed to have been written 1,000 years earlier and ascribed to Imhotep. Greek physician Hippocrates around 400 BC commented on it in his Aphorisms, noting its absence in eunuchs and premenopausal women. Aulus Cornelius Celsus (30 AD) described the linkage with alcohol, later onset in women and associated kidney problems:

Again thick urine, the sediment from which is white, indicates that pain and disease are to be apprehended in the region of joints or viscera ... Joint troubles in the hands and feet are very frequent and persistent, such as occur in cases of podagra and cheiragra. These seldom attack eunuchs or boys before coition with a woman, or women except those in whom the menses have become suppressed ... some have obtained lifelong security by refraining from wine, mead and venery.

Benjamin Welles, an English physician, authored the first medical book on gout, A Treatise of the Gout, or Joint Evil, in 1669. In 1683, Thomas Sydenham, an English physician, described its occurrence in the early hours of the morning and its predilection for older males:

Gouty patients are, generally, either old men or men who have so worn themselves out in youth as to have brought on a premature old age—of such dissolute habits none being more common than the premature and excessive indulgence in venery and the like exhausting passions. The victim goes to bed and sleeps in good health. About two o'clock in the morning he is awakened by a severe pain in the great toe; more rarely in the heel, ankle, or instep. The pain is like that of a dislocation and yet parts feel as if cold water were poured over them. Then follows chills and shivers and a little fever ... The night is passed in torture, sleeplessness, turning the part affected and perpetual change of posture; the tossing about of body being as incessant as the pain of the tortured joint and being worse as the fit comes on.

In the 18th century, Thomas Marryat distinguished different manifestations of gout:

The Gout is a chronical disease most commonly affecting the feet. If it attacks the knees, it is called Gonagra; if the hands, Chiragra; if the elbow, Onagra; if the shoulder, Omagra; if the back or loins, Lumbago.

Dutch scientist Antonie van Leeuwenhoek first described the microscopic appearance of urate crystals in 1679. In 1848, English physician Alfred Baring Garrod identified excess uric acid in the blood as the cause of gout.

== Other animals ==
Gout is rare in most other animals due to their ability to produce uricase, which breaks down uric acid. Humans and other great apes do not have this ability, and can manifest gout. Other animals with uricase include fish, amphibians, and most non-primate mammals. Avian gout is known to affect some bird species. The Tyrannosaurus rex specimen known as "Sue" is believed to have had gout.

== Research ==
Several new medications are under study for treating gout, including anakinra, canakinumab, and rilonacept. Canakinumab may result in better outcomes than a low dose of a glucocorticoid, but costs five thousand times more. A recombinant uricase enzyme (rasburicase) is available but its use is limited, as it triggers an immune response. Versions that are less antigenic are in development.
