= Tumor lysis syndrome =

Disease due to contents of killed cancer cells being released into the bloodstream

- Specialty: Oncology, hematology, critical care medicine, nephrology
- Symptoms: Muscle spasms, heart arrhythmias, seizures, decreased urine output
- Complications: Torsades de pointes, heart arrhythmias leading to death, heart failure, kidney failure
- Usual onset: Usually 24–72 hours after chemotherapy, but rarely may occur spontaneously
- Risk factors: Hematologic cancers with high tumor burden or lymphocytosis, such as ALL, AML, Burkitt's lymphoma, CLL with large lymph node masses, intensive chemotherapy regimens, anthracycline based chemotherapy, venetoclax based chemotherapy
- Diagnostic method: Cairo-Bishop diagnostic criteria: Blood chemistry showing high uric acid, high potassium, high phosphorus, low calcium in combination with clinical findings (acute kidney injury, heart arrhythmias)
- Treatment: IV fluids, diuretics, xanthine oxidase inhibitors such as allopurinol or recombinant urate oxidase agent rasburicase to lower uric acid, methods to reduce potassium, phosphorus, methods to stabilize heart cells to prevent arrythmias (intravenous calcium), dialysis
- Medication: Uric acid lowering agents (allopurinol, febuxostat, rasburicase)

Tumor lysis syndrome (TLS) is a group of metabolic abnormalities that can occur as a complication from the treatment of cancer, where large amounts of tumor cells are killed off (lysed) from the treatment, releasing their contents into the bloodstream. This occurs most commonly after the treatment of lymphomas and leukemias and in particular when treating non-Hodgkin lymphoma, acute myeloid leukemia, and acute lymphoblastic leukemia. This is a potentially fatal complication and people at an increased risk for TLS should be closely monitored while receiving chemotherapy and should receive preventive measures and treatments as necessary. TLS can also occur on its own (while not being treated with chemotherapy) although this is less common.

Tumor lysis syndrome is characterized by high blood potassium (hyperkalemia), high blood phosphate (hyperphosphatemia), low blood calcium (hypocalcemia), high blood uric acid (hyperuricemia), and higher than normal levels of blood urea nitrogen (BUN). These changes in blood electrolytes and metabolites are a result of the release of cellular contents of dying cells into the bloodstream. In this respect, TLS is analogous to rhabdomyolysis, with comparable mechanism and blood chemistry effects but with different cause. In TLS, the breakdown occurs after cytotoxic therapy or from cancers with high cell turnover and tumor proliferation rates. The metabolic abnormalities seen in tumor lysis syndrome can ultimately result in serious complications such as acute uric acid nephropathy, acute kidney failure, seizures, cardiac arrhythmias, and death.

== Signs and symptoms ==
Tumor lysis syndrome most commonly occurs after chemotherapy treatments for cancer, and usually occurs within 24 to 72 hours of treatment. Signs and symptoms of TLS are due to release of cellular contents into the bloodstream as cancer cells die.

- Hyperkalemia. Potassium is mainly an intracellular ion. High turnover of tumor cells leads to release of potassium from cells into the blood. Symptoms usually do not manifest until levels are high (> 6.5 mmol/L) [normal 3.5–5.0 mmol/L] and they include
  - palpitations, cardiac conduction abnormalities, and arrhythmias (can be fatal)
  - muscle weakness or paralysis
- Hyperphosphatemia. Like potassium, phosphates are also predominantly intracellular and are also released as tumor cells die during therapy. Hyperphosphatemia causes acute kidney injury in tumor lysis syndrome, because of deposition of calcium phosphate crystals in the kidney tissue.
- Hypocalcemia. Because of the hyperphosphatemia, phosphorus binds calcium and is precipitated to form calcium phosphate, leading to hypocalcemia. Symptoms of hypocalcemia include:
  - tetany
  - paresthesias
  - muscle cramps
  - muscle weakness
  - sudden changes in mental status, including emotional lability
  - Parkinsonian (extrapyramidal) movement disorders
  - papilledema
  - Torsades des pointes: a type of heart arrhythmia that may progress to cardiac arrest and death.
- Hyperuricemia and hyperuricosuria. Massive cell death and nuclear (DNA) breakdown generates large quantities of nucleic acids. Of these, the purines (adenine and guanine) are converted to uric acid via the purine degradation pathway and excreted in the urine. However, at the high concentrations of uric acid generated by tumor lysis, uric acid is apt to precipitate as monosodium urate crystals. Acute uric acid nephropathy (AUAN) due to hyperuricosuria has been a dominant cause of acute kidney failure, but with the advent of effective treatments for hyperuricemia, AUAN has become a less common cause than hyperphosphatemia.

== Risk factors ==
Risk factors for tumor lysis syndrome depend on several different characteristics of the patient, the type of cancer, and the type of chemotherapy used.

Tumor characteristics: Tumors with a high cell turnover rate, rapid growth rate, and high tumor bulk tend to be more associated with the development of tumor lysis syndrome. The most common tumors associated with this syndrome are poorly differentiated lymphomas (such as Burkitt's lymphoma), other Non-Hodgkin Lymphomas (NHL), acute lymphoblastic leukemia (ALL), and acute myeloid leukemia (AML). Chronic lymphocytic leukemia (CLL) with large lymph node masses (greater than 10 cm) or greater than 5 cm with lymphocytosis is associated with a higher risk of TLS.

Patient characteristics: Certain patient-related factors may increase the risk of tumor lysis syndrome. These factors include chronic kidney disease, older age, dehydration, and other issues affecting urinary flow or the acidity of urine. Use of certain medications such as Non-steroidal anti-inflammatory drugs (NSAIDs) or other medications which may damage the kidneys increases the risk of TLS.

Chemotherapy characteristics: Intensive induction chemotherapy (the initiation dose) that is highly effective and cytotoxic (leading to cancer cell death) has a higher risk of tumor lysis syndrome. The chemotherapeutic drugs anthracycline and cytarabine have a higher risk as well. Venetoclax (a chemotherapeutic regimen often used in the treatment of B-cell lymphomas) has a high risk of TLS. Radiation therapy for cancer is less commonly associated with TLS.

Chemosensitive tumors, such as lymphomas, carry a higher risk for the development of tumor lysis syndrome as they are more responsive to a chemotherapy agent. Usually, the precipitating medication regimen includes combination chemotherapy, but TLS can be triggered in cancer patients by steroid treatments, and sometimes without any treatment—in this case the condition is referred to as "spontaneous tumor lysis syndrome".

== Diagnosis ==
Tumor lysis syndrome should be suspected in people with cancer who develop hyperuricemia (high uric acid levels), hyperphosphatemia (high phosphorus), hyperkalemia (high potassium), and hypocalcemia (low calcium) with clinical signs of kidney failure, heart arrhythmias, or heart failure within 24 to 72 hours of starting chemotherapy for cancer. Although, rarely, TLS has been associated with radiation therapy, glucocorticoids or occurring spontaneously (irrespective of cancer therapy). Kidney failure in TLS may present as an increased creatinine level or a drop in urine output. The urinalysis may show uric acid crystals or amorphous urates. The hypersecretion of uric acid can be detected with a high urine uric acid - creatinine ratio > 1.0, compared to a value of 0.6–0.7 for most other causes of acute kidney failure.

=== Cairo-Bishop definition ===
In 2004, Cairo and Bishop defined a classification system for tumor lysis syndrome. A least two laboratory and one clinical criteria must be met for a diagnosis of TLS.

- Laboratory tumor lysis syndrome: abnormality in two or more of the following, occurring within three days before or seven days after chemotherapy.
  - uric acid > 8 mg/dL or 25% increase
  - potassium > 6 meq/L or 25% increase
  - phosphate > 4.5 mg/dL or 25% increase
  - calcium < 7 mg/dL or 25% decrease
- Clinical tumor lysis syndrome: laboratory tumor lysis syndrome plus one or more of the following:
  - increased serum creatinine (1.5 times upper limit of normal); a marker of kidney damage
  - cardiac arrhythmia or sudden death
  - seizure

A grading scale (0–5) is used depending on the presence and severity of laboratory abnormalities and severity of signs and symptoms. The higher numbers in the scale are associated with a more severe stage, grade 5 is TLS that results in death.

=== Howard definition ===
In 2011, Howard proposed a refinement of the standard Cairo-Bishop definition of TLS accounting for 2 limitations:

- Two or more electrolyte laboratory abnormalities must be present simultaneously to be considered related to TLS. In fact, some patients may present with one abnormality, but later another one may develop that is unrelated to the TLS (e.g., hypocalcemia associated with sepsis).
- A 25% change from baseline should not be considered a criterion since such increases are rarely clinically important unless the value is already outside the normal range.

Moreover, any symptomatic hypocalcemia should constitute clinical TLS.

== Prevention ==
Tumor lysis syndrome most commonly occurs 24-72 hours after chemotherapy, therefore certain preventative measures may be initiated before, during and after chemotherapy to prevent TLS.

It is important to prevent life-threatening manifestations associated with TLS which include acute kidney injury, hyperkalemia (which may cause cardiac arrhythmias), and or hypocalcemia (which may cause cardiac arrhythmias and neuromuscular irritability).

Acute kidney injury: Patients at risk for developing TLS (e.g. patients about to receive chemotherapy for a cancer with a high cell turnover rate, especially lymphomas and leukemias) should receive appropriate intravenous hydration in order to improve blood flow to the kidneys, maximize urine output, and ultimately prevent precipitation of uric acid crystals that can lead to acute kidney injury. A diuretic may also be indicated to further increase urine output in addition to intravenous hydration. Another approach to prevent damage to the kidneys is to prevent the buildup of uric acid, and this can be accomplished with use of uric acid lowering therapies. These include xanthine oxidase inhibitors such as allopurinol (preferred) or febuxostat. Allopurinol and febuxostat work by preventing the formation of uric acid following tumor cell lysis during treatment. Rasburicase is a synthetic urate oxidase enzyme and acts by degrading uric acid into highly soluble allantoin which is then excreted by the kidneys. No current guidelines endorse the concurrent use of allopurinol and rasburicase. It is not recommended to alkalinize urine in the management of TLS: although doing so increases the solubility of urate, it also creates calcium phosphate crystals which deposit in the kidneys leading to kidney damage.

Hyperkalemia: Monitoring potassium levels in the blood frequently and cardiac monitoring (given the risk of cardiac arrhythmias) are important components in the prevention of adverse consequences in TLS. Other strategies, such as limiting oral intake of potassium, and excreting potassium through the gastrointestinal tract using agents such as oral sodium polystyrene sulfonate, can be beneficial. Insulin therapy (in conjunction with glucose administration) as well as beta-receptor agonists (such as albuterol) can also be used to shift potassium into cells, lowering serum potassium levels. But these are temporary interventions, and potassium is not excreted from the body.

Hypocalcemia: Hyperphosphatemia is a common finding in TLS, and high phosphorus levels can in turn contribute to hypocalcemia. Therefore, phosphate binders may be beneficial in preventing this form of hypocalcemia.

== Treatment ==
Treatment is first targeted at the specific metabolic disorder.

In general, uric acid lowering therapy (allopurinol or rasburicase) and hydration with intravenous fluids are the mainstays of treatment in patients with clinical evidence of tumor lysis syndrome. With widespread use of uric acid lowering therapy, hyperphosphatemia has now supplanted uric acid as the most common cause of kidney damage in those with tumor lysis syndrome.

A loop diuretic may also be indicated to maintain appropriate production of urine by the kidneys. Further treatment is targeted towards the specific metabolic abnormalities present in patients with TLS (see "main articles" linked above). Mild hyperkalemia without symptoms can be treated with a loop diuretic and potassium binders which bind potassium and facilitate its excretion through the gastrointestinal tract, examples include sodium zirconium cyclosilicate (Lokelma) or sodium polystyrene sulfonate. Temporizing agents such as rapid acting insulin (in conjunction with glucose), inhaled beta-agonists such as albuterol and an agent to stabilize cardiac membranes such as calcium carbonate may be given in cases of severe hyperkalemia. Concerning symptoms related to hypocalcemia (e.g. seizures) in TLS patients can be treated with calcium gluconate. Tumor lysis patients may ultimately also require renal replacement therapy such as dialysis if indicated, which can quickly normalize electrolyte levels in the blood.

Alkalinization of the urine, once commonly used in the treatment of tumor lysis syndrome as it was thought to increase uric acid solubility, is no longer recommended. It is not associated with benefits and may actually worsen outcomes as it is associated with high phosphorus, low calcium levels and calcium-phosphate crystal kidney deposits with kidney damage.

Those with TLS undergoing treatment require frequent blood chemistry monitoring, and continuous cardiac monitoring with telemetry and frequent electrocardiograms to identify any life-threatening arrhythmias that are common.

== Prognosis ==
In a registry based study examining more than 28,000 patients discharged from hospitals in the United States between 2010-2013 with a diagnosis of tumor lysis syndrome, the condition was associated with an in-hospital mortality of 21%. Other potential complications in those with tumor lysis syndrome included sepsis (seen in 22% of people), requiring dialysis (15%), respiratory failure (23%), requiring a ventilator (16%), gastrointestinal bleeding (6%), brain bleed (2%), seizures (1%) and cardiac arrest (2%). Older age, having more medical co-morbidities, and the type of cancer predicted a poorer response in those with TLS.

The occurrence of acute kidney injury with TLS confers a worse prognosis given the high mortality that is generally associated with it.
