= Hydroxyisourate hydrolase =

Class of enzymes

Identifiers
- EC no.: 3.5.2.17

Databases
- BRENDA: enzyme data
- ExPASy: NiceZyme view
- KEGG: enzyme entry
- MetaCyc: metabolic pathway
- Rhea: reactions
- PDB structures: RCSB PDB PDBe PDBsum
Search
- PMC: articles
- PubMed: articles
- NCBI: proteins

Hydroxyisourate hydrolase (EC 3.5.2.17) is an enzyme characterised from soybean that catalyzes the hydrolysis of 5-hydroxyisouric acid to 5-hydroxy-2-oxo-4-ureido-2,5-dihydro-1H-imidazole-5-carboxylate:

5-hydroxyisouric acid
H_{2}O
5-hydroxy-2-oxo-4-ureido-2,5-dihydro-1H-imidazole-5-carboxylate

This reaction is part of the breakdown pathway in purine metabolism, starting when uric acid is oxidised by urate oxidase to give 5-hydroxyisouric acid and leading to the (S) enantiomer of allantoin after the product is acted on by 2-oxo-4-hydroxy-4-carboxy-5-ureidoimidazoline decarboxylase.

This enzyme is a hydrolase, one acting on carbon-nitrogen bonds other than peptide bonds, specifically in cyclic amides. The systematic name of this enzyme class is 5-hydroxyisourate amidohydrolase. Other names in use include HIUHase, and 5-hydroxyisourate hydrolase.

== Structural studies ==
As of late 2007, two structures have been solved for this class of enzymes, with PDB accession codes PDB: 2H1X and PDB: 2H6U.
