= FAD-dependent urate hydroxylase =

Class of enzymes

Identifiers
- EC no.: 1.14.13.113

Databases
- IntEnz: IntEnz view
- BRENDA: BRENDA entry
- ExPASy: NiceZyme view
- KEGG: KEGG entry
- MetaCyc: metabolic pathway
- PRIAM: profile
- PDB structures: RCSB PDB PDBe PDBsum
Search
- PMC: articles
- PubMed: articles
- NCBI: proteins

FAD-dependent urate hydroxylase (EC 1.14.13.113, HpxO enzyme, FAD-dependent urate oxidase, urate hydroxylase) is an enzyme with systematic name urate,NADH:oxygen oxidoreductase (5-hydroxyisourate forming). A non-homologous isofunctional enzyme (NISE) to HpxO was found, and named HpyO. HpyO was determined to be a typical Michaelian enzyme. These FAD-dependent urate hydroxylases are flavoproteins.

This enzyme catalyses the following chemical reaction

urate + FADH + H^{+} + O_{2} $\rightleftharpoons$ 5-hydroxyisourate + FAD^{+} + H_{2}O
