= 2-oxo-4-hydroxy-4-carboxy-5-ureidoimidazoline decarboxylase =

Class of enzymes

Identifiers
- EC no.: 4.1.1.97

Databases
- BRENDA: enzyme data
- ExPASy: NiceZyme view
- KEGG: enzyme entry
- MetaCyc: metabolic pathway
- Rhea: reactions
- PDB structures: RCSB PDB PDBe PDBsum
Search
- PMC: articles
- PubMed: articles
- NCBI: proteins

OHCU decarboxylase

Identifiers
- Symbol: OHCU_decarbox
- Pfam: PF09349
- InterPro: IPR018020
Available protein structures:
- PDB: IPR018020 PF09349 (ECOD; PDBsum)
- AlphaFold: IPR018020; PF09349

2-oxo-4-hydroxy-4-carboxy-5-ureidoimidazoline decarboxylase (OHCU decarboxylase) EC 4.1.1.97 is an enzyme involved in purine catabolism. It catalyses the decarboxylation of 2-oxo-4-hydroxy-4-carboxy-5-ureidoimidazoline (OHCU) into (S)-(+)-allantoin.

OCHU
CO_{2}
(S)-(+)-allantoin

This is the third step of the conversion of uric acid (a purine derivative) to allantoin. Step one is catalysed by urate oxidase and step two is catalysed by hydroxyisourate hydrolase.
