= Urate oxidase =

Metabolic enzyme expressed in all species except certain primates

UOX

Identifiers
- Aliases: UOX, UOXP, URICASE, Urate oxidase, urate oxidase (pseudogene)
- External IDs: MGI: 98907; GeneCards: UOX

Gene location (Mouse)
Chr.	Chromosome 3 (mouse)
Band	3 H2|3 72.09 cM	Start	146,276,181 bp
Band	3 H2|3 72.09 cM	End	146,338,060 bp
Orthologs
Databases	NCBI: entry; OMA: entry
Species	Human	Mouse
Entrez	391051	22262
Ensembl	ENSG00000240520	ENSMUSG00000028186
UniProt	n a	P25688
RefSeq (mRNA)	n/a	NM_009474
RefSeq (protein)	n/a	NP_033500
Location (UCSC)	n/a	Chr 3: 146.28 – 146.34 Mb
PubMed search
- Wikidata
View/Edit Human	View/Edit Mouse

In molecular biology, urate oxidase (UO), also known as uricase or factor-independent urate hydroxylase, is a metabolic enzyme found in nearly all species from bacteria to mammals, but is not expressed in humans, great apes, and certain New World monkeys, in which it exists as a pseudogene. It catalyzes the oxidation of uric acid to 5-hydroxyisourate:

Uric acid + O_{2} + H_{2}O → 5-hydroxyisourate + H_{2}O_{2}
5-hydroxyisourate + H_{2}O → 2-oxo-4-hydroxy-4-carboxy-5-ureidoimidazoline
2-oxo-4-hydroxy-4-carboxy-5-ureidoimidazoline → allantoin + CO_{2}

sequence of oxidation of ureate.

== Species distribution ==
Urate oxidase is found in nearly all organisms, from bacteria to mammals, but is a pseudogene in humans, great apes, and certain New World monkeys, having been lost during primate evolution. This means that instead of producing allantoin as the end product of purine oxidation, the pathway ends with uric acid. This leads to humans and many primates having much higher and more highly variable levels of urate in the blood than most other mammals.

== Convergent evolution ==
Urate oxidase is a notable example of the existence of non-homologous isofunctional enzymes, proteins with independent evolutionary origin catalyzing the same chemical reaction.

Besides the cofactorless urate oxidase (UOX), which is found in all three domains of life, other bacterial proteins are known that catalyze the same reaction without being evolutionarily related to UOX. These are two different oxidases (named HpxO and HpyO) that use FAD and NAD+ as cofactors, and one integral membrane protein (named PuuD) that additionally contains a cytochrome c protein domain.

== Localization ==
In rat, urate oxidase is mainly localised in the liver, where it forms a large electron-dense paracrystalline core in many peroxisomes.

== Structure ==
Uricase

Identifiers
- Symbol: Uricase
- Pfam: PF01014
- InterPro: IPR002042
- PROSITE: PDOC00315
- SCOP2: 1uox / SCOPe / SUPFAM
Available protein structures:
- PDB: 1ws2D:142-291 1r56A:142-291 1ws3B:142-291 1xxjD:142-291 1xt4A:142-291 1r4uA:142-291 1r51A:142-291 1r4sA:142-291 1j2gB:336-476 IPR002042 PF01014 (ECOD; PDBsum)
- AlphaFold: IPR002042; PF01014

The enzyme exists as a tetramer of identical subunits, each containing a possible type 2 copper-binding site.

Urate oxidase is a homotetrameric enzyme containing four identical active sites situated at the interfaces between its four subunits. UO from A. flavus is made up of 301 residues and has a molecular weight of 33438 daltons. It is unique among the oxidases in that it does not require a metal atom or an organic co-factor for catalysis. Sequence analysis of several organisms has determined that there are 24 amino acids which are conserved, and of these, 15 are involved with the active site.

== Function ==
factor-independent urate hydroxylase

Identifiers
- EC no.: 1.7.3.3
- CAS no.: 9002-12-4

Databases
- BRENDA: enzyme data
- ExPASy: NiceZyme view
- KEGG: enzyme entry
- MetaCyc: metabolic pathway
- Rhea: reactions
- PDB structures: RCSB PDB PDBe PDBsum
- Gene Ontology: AmiGO / QuickGO
Search
- PMC: articles
- PubMed: articles
- NCBI: proteins

Urate oxidase is the first enzyme in a pathway of three enzymes to convert uric acid to S-(+)-allantoin. After uric acid is converted to 5-hydroxyisourate by urate oxidase, 5-hydroxyisourate (HIU) is converted to 2-oxo-4-hydroxy-4-carboxy-5-ureidoimidazoline (OHCU) by HIU hydrolase, and then to S-(+)-allantoin by 2-oxo-4-hydroxy-4-carboxy-5-ureidoimidazoline decarboxylase (OHCU decarboxylase). Without HIU hydrolase and OHCU decarboxylase, HIU will spontaneously decompose into racemic allantoin.

The active site binds uric acid (and its analogues), allowing it to interact with O_{2}. According to X-ray crystallography, it is the conjugate base of uric acid that binds and is then deprotonated to a dianion. The dianion is stabilized by extensive hydrogen-bonding, e.g., to Arg 176 and Gln 228 . Oxygen accepts two electrons from the urate dianion, via a sequence of one-electron transfers, ultimately yielding hydrogen peroxide and the dehydrogenated substrate. The dehydrourate adds water (hydrates) to produce 5-hydroxyisourate.

== Inhibitors ==
Urate oxidase is known to be inhibited by both cyanide and chloride ions. Inhibition involves anion-π interactions between the inhibitor and the uric acid substrate.

== Clinical significance ==
Genetically, the loss of urate oxidase function in humans was caused by two nonsense mutations at codons 33 and 187 and an aberrant splice site.

It has been proposed that the loss of urate oxidase gene expression has been advantageous to hominoids, since uric acid is a powerful antioxidant and scavenger of singlet oxygen and radicals. Its presence provides the body with protection from oxidative damage, thus prolonging life and decreasing age-specific cancer rates.

However, uric acid plays a complex physiological role in several processes, including inflammation and danger signalling, and modern purine-rich diets can lead to hyperuricaemia, which is linked to many diseases including an increased risk of developing gout.

Children with non-Hodgkin's lymphoma (NHL), specifically with Burkitt's lymphoma and B-cell acute lymphoblastic leukemia (B-ALL), often experience tumor lysis syndrome (TLS), which occurs when breakdown of tumor cells by chemotherapy releases uric acid and cause the formation of uric acid crystals in the renal tubules and collecting ducts. This can lead to kidney failure and even death. Studies suggest that patients at a high risk of developing TLS may benefit from the administration of urate oxidase. However, humans lack the subsequent enzyme HIU hydroxylase in the pathway to degrade uric acid to allantoin, so long-term urate oxidase therapy could potentially have harmful effects because of toxic effects of HIU.

Higher uric acid levels have also been associated with epilepsy. However, it was found in mouse models that disrupting urate oxidase actually decreases brain excitability and susceptibility to seizures.

Graft-versus-host disease (GVHD) is often a side effect of allogeneic hematopoietic stem cell transplantation (HSCT), driven by donor T cells destroying host tissue. Uric acid has been shown to increase T cell response, so clinical trials have shown that urate oxidase can be administered to decrease uric acid levels in the patient and subsequently decrease the likelihood of GVHD.

== Medical uses ==
Urate oxidase is formulated as a protein drug (rasburicase) for the treatment of acute hyperuricemia in patients receiving chemotherapy. A PEGylated form of urate oxidase, pegloticase, was FDA approved in 2010 for the treatment of chronic gout in adult patients refractory to "conventional therapy".

== In legumes ==
UO is also an essential enzyme in the ureide pathway, where nitrogen fixation occurs in the root nodules of legumes. The fixed nitrogen is converted to metabolites that are transported from the roots throughout the plant to provide the needed nitrogen for amino acid biosynthesis.

In legumes, 2 forms of uricase are found: in the roots, the tetrameric form; and, in the uninfected cells of root nodules, a monomeric form, which plays an important role in nitrogen-fixation.

== See also ==
- 5-hydroxyisourate hydrolase
- 2-oxo-4-hydroxy-4-carboxy-5-ureidoimidazoline decarboxylase
