= EIPR1 =

Protein-coding gene in humans

Identifiers
- Aliases: EIPR1, TSSC1, tumor suppressing subtransferable candidate 1, EIPR-1, EARP complex and GARP complex interacting protein 1
- External IDs: OMIM: 608998; MGI: 1289332; GeneCards: EIPR1

Gene location (Human)
Chr.	Chromosome 2 (human)
Band	2p25.3	Start	3,188,925 bp
Band	2p25.3	End	3,377,830 bp

Gene location (Mouse)
Chr.	Chromosome 12 (mouse)
Band	12 A2|12 11.26 cM	Start	28,801,802 bp
Band	12 A2|12 11.26 cM	End	28,919,864 bp
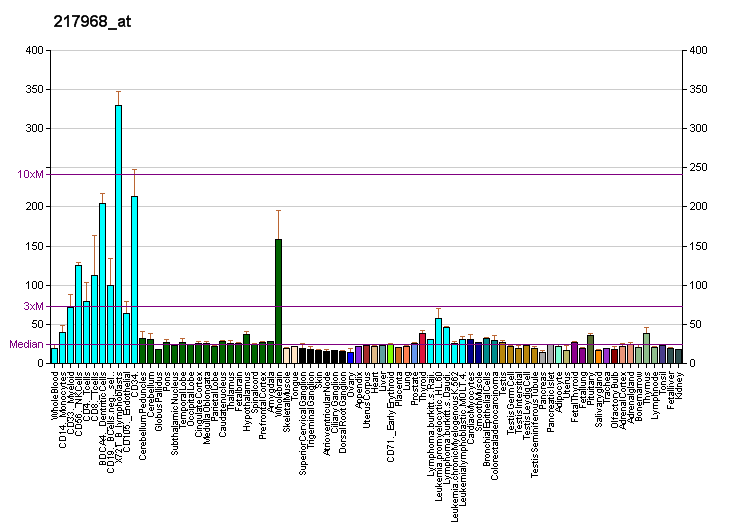
RNA expression pattern
Bgee	Human / Mouse (ortholog); Top expressed in: prefrontal cortex; anterior pituitary; nucleus accumbens; anterior cingulate cortex; right frontal lobe; putamen; Brodmann area 9; caudate nucleus; oocyte; olfactory zone of nasal mucosa / Top expressed in: dentate gyrus of hippocampal formation granule cell; yolk sac; superior frontal gyrus; morula; embryo; blood; right kidney; embryo; primary visual cortex; neural tube; More reference expression data
BioGPS	More reference expression data
Orthologs
Databases	NCBI: entry; OMA: entry
Species	Human	Mouse
Entrez	7260	380752
Ensembl	ENSG00000032389	ENSMUSG00000036613
UniProt	Q53HC9	Q8K0G5
RefSeq (mRNA)	NM_003310; NM_001330530; NM_001330531	NM_201357; NM_001379229; NM_001379230
RefSeq (protein)	NP_001317459; NP_001317460; NP_003301	NP_958745; NP_001366158; NP_001366159; NP_001390093; NP_001390094
Location (UCSC)	Chr 2: 3.19 – 3.38 Mb	Chr 12: 28.8 – 28.92 Mb
PubMed search
- Wikidata
View/Edit Human	View/Edit Mouse

EARP and GARP complex-interacting protein 1 is a protein that in humans is encoded by the EIPR1 gene (previously TSSC1).

== Function ==
This gene has been reported as one of several tumor-suppressing subtransferable fragments located in the imprinted gene domain of 11p15.5, an important tumor-suppressor gene region. Alterations in this region have been associated with the Beckwith-Wiedemann syndrome, Wilms tumor, rhabdomyosarcoma, adrenocortical carcinoma, and lung, ovarian, and breast cancer. Alignment of this gene to genomic sequence data suggests that this gene may reside on chromosome 2 rather than chromosome 11.
