= Rasburicase =

Pharmaceutical drug

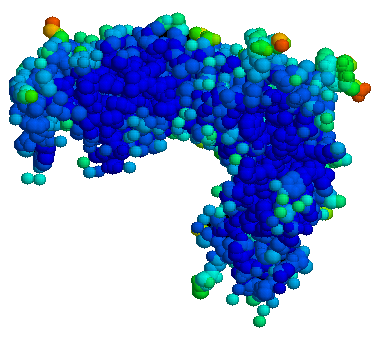

Clinical data
- Trade names: Elitek, Fasturtec
- AHFS/Drugs.com: Monograph
- License data: US DailyMed: Rasburicase
- Pregnancy category: AU: B2
- Routes of administration: Intravenous infusion
- ATC code: V03AF07 (WHO)

Legal status
- Legal status: AU: S4 (Prescription only); US: ℞-only; EU: Rx-only; In general: ℞ (Prescription only)

Pharmacokinetic data
- Bioavailability: N/A
- Elimination half-life: 18 hrs

Identifiers
- IUPAC name: Aspergillus urate oxidase
- CAS Number: 134774-45-1
- IUPHAR/BPS: 7467
- DrugBank: DB00049
- ChemSpider: none
- UNII: 08GY9K1EUO
- KEGG: D05704
- ChEMBL: ChEMBL1201594
- ECHA InfoCard: 100.207.686

Chemical and physical data
- Formula: C_{1521}H_{2381}N_{417}O_{461}S_{7}
- Molar mass: 34109.66 g·mol^{−1}

Rasburicase, sold under the brand name Elitek in the US and Fasturtec in the EU, is a medication that helps to clear uric acid from the blood. It is a recombinant version of urate oxidase, an enzyme that metabolizes uric acid to allantoin. Urate oxidase is known to be present in many mammals but does not naturally occur in humans. Rasburicase is produced by a genetically modified Saccharomyces cerevisiae strain. The complementary DNA (cDNA) coding for rasburicase was cloned from a strain of Aspergillus flavus.

Rasburicase (Q00511) is a tetrameric protein with identical subunits. Each subunit is made up of a single 301 amino acid polypeptide chain with a molecular mass of about 34 kDa. The drug product is a sterile, white to off-white, lyophilized powder intended for intravenous administration following reconstitution with a diluent. Elitek (rasburicase) is supplied in 3 mL and 10 mL colorless, glass vials containing rasburicase at a concentration of 1.5 mg/mL after reconstitution.

It is on the World Health Organization's List of Essential Medicines.

== Medical uses ==
Rasburicase is approved for use by the U.S. Food and Drug Administration (and European counterparts) for the prevention and treatment of tumor lysis syndrome (TLS) in people receiving chemotherapy for hematologic cancers such as leukemias and lymphomas. However, it is not clear if it results in important benefits such as decreased kidney problems or decreased risk of death as of 2017.

It is being investigated for treating severely high blood levels of uric acid from other sources. For example, it has been used for hyperuricemia in gout, in other rheumatologic conditions, and in rhabdomyolysis with kidney failure.

=== Contraindication ===
Rasburicase use is contraindicated in patients with a G6PDH deficiency as it may cause sudden, severe hemolysis. The blood smear revealed numerous abnormal red blood cells (RBCs) with membranous defects (bite cells) and submembranous blister-like structures (blister cells). These cell types are characteristic of Heinz body hemolytic anemia (HBHA). While Heinz bodies are not visible on a Giemsa-stained smear, they can be detected with supravital staining, appearing as 1- to 3-μm inclusions in RBCs (inset).

== Side effects ==
Rasburicase administration can cause anaphylaxis (incidence unknown); methemoglobinemia may occur in susceptible individuals such as those with G6PDH deficiency due to the production of hydrogen peroxide in the urate oxidase reaction. Testing patients for G6PDH deficiency prior to starting a course of rasburicase has been recommended.

== Pharmacology ==
=== Mechanism of Action ===
In humans, uric acid is the final step in the catabolic pathway of purines. Rasburicase catalyzes enzymatic oxidation of poorly soluble uric acid into an inactive and more soluble metabolite allantoin with carbon dioxide and hydrogen peroxide as byproducts in the chemical reaction.

=== Pharmacodynamics ===
The measurement of plasma uric acid was used to evaluate the effectiveness of rasburicase in clinical studies. Following administration of either 0.15 or 0.20 mg/kg rasburicase daily for up to 5 days, plasma uric acid levels decreased within 4 hours and were maintained below 7.5 mg/dL in 98% of adult and 90% of pediatric patients for at least 7 days. There was no evidence of a dose response effect on uric acid control for doses between 0.15 and 0.20 mg/kg rasburicase.

=== Pharmacokinetics ===
The pharmacokinetics of rasburicase were evaluated in both pediatric and adult patients with leukemia, lymphoma or other hematological malignancies. Rasburicase exposure, as measured by AUC0-24 hr and Cmax, tended to increase with a dose range from 0.15 to 0.2 mg/kg. The mean terminal half-life was similar between pediatric and adult patients and ranged from 15.7 to 22.5 hours. The mean volume of distribution of rasburicase ranged from 110 to 127 mL/kg in pediatric patients and from 75.8 to 138 mL/kg in adult patients, respectively. Minimal accumulation of rasburicase ( < 1.3 fold) was observed between days 1 and 5 of dosing. In adults, age, gender, baseline liver enzymes and creatinine clearance did not impact the pharmacokinetics of rasburicase. A cross-study comparison revealed that after administration of rasburicase at 0.15 or 0.20 mg/kg, the geometric mean values of body-weight normalized clearance were approximately 40% lower in Japanese (n=20) than that in Caucasians (n=22).

== Society and culture ==
=== Economics ===
Rasburicase is much more expensive than the conventional uric acid lowering treatment for tophaceous gout.
