= PRPSAP1 =

Protein-coding gene in the species Homo sapiens

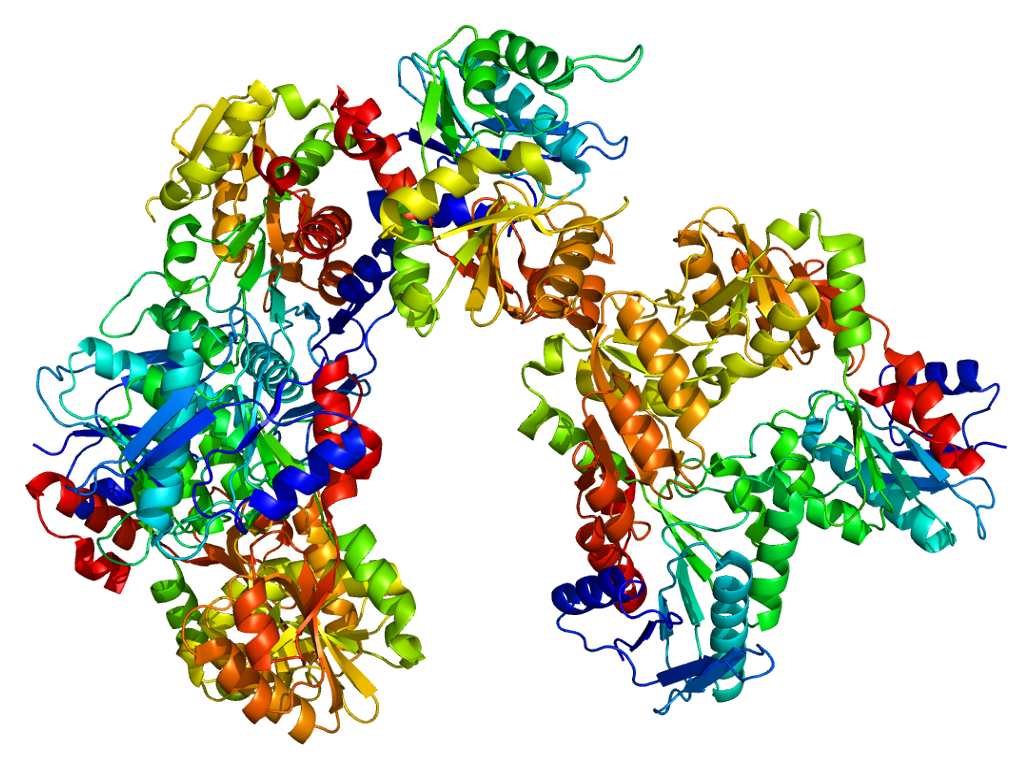
Available structures
PDB	Ortholog search: PDBe RCSB
PDB	List of PDB id codes 2C4K

Identifiers
- Aliases: PRPSAP1, PAP39, phosphoribosyl pyrophosphate synthetase-associated protein 1, phosphoribosyl pyrophosphate synthetase associated protein 1
- External IDs: OMIM: 601249; MGI: 1915013; HomoloGene: 55687; GeneCards: PRPSAP1; OMA:PRPSAP1 - orthologs

Gene location (Human)
Chr.	Chromosome 17 (human)
Band	17q25.1	Start	76,309,478 bp
Band	17q25.1	End	76,384,521 bp

Gene location (Mouse)
Chr.	Chromosome 11 (mouse)
Band	11|11 E2	Start	116,361,671 bp
Band	11|11 E2	End	116,385,028 bp
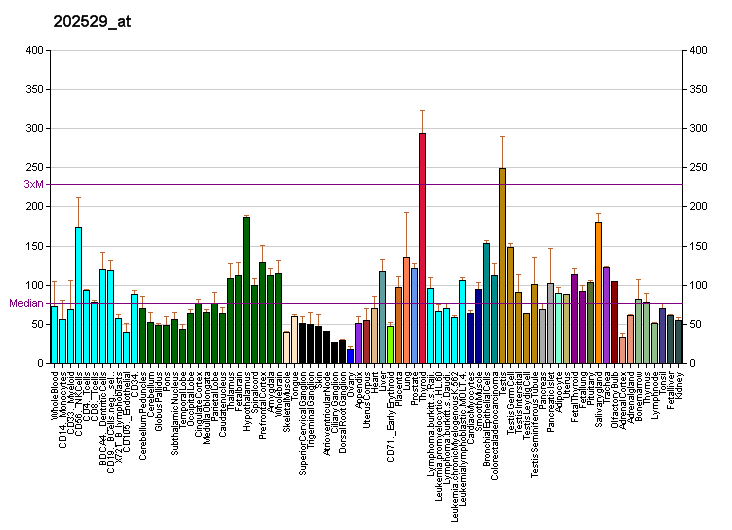
RNA expression pattern
Bgee	Human / Mouse (ortholog); Top expressed in: parotid gland; right lobe of thyroid gland; gonad; minor salivary glands; left lobe of thyroid gland; left testis; right testis; right lung; ventricular zone; right adrenal cortex / Top expressed in: Paneth cell; internal carotid artery; epithelium of lens; external carotid artery; duodenum; crypt of lieberkuhn of small intestine; endothelial cell of lymphatic vessel; left lobe of liver; condyle; jejunum; More reference expression data
BioGPS	More reference expression data
Gene ontology
Molecular function	enzyme inhibitor activity; ribose phosphate diphosphokinase activity; magnesium ion binding; protein binding; identical protein binding; enzyme regulator activity
Cellular component	ribose phosphate diphosphokinase complex; cytoplasm
Biological process	nucleotide biosynthetic process; nucleobase-containing compound metabolic process; negative regulation of catalytic activity; 5-phosphoribose 1-diphosphate biosynthetic process; purine nucleotide biosynthetic process; regulation of catalytic activity
Sources:Amigo / QuickGO
Orthologs
Species	Human	Mouse
Entrez	5635	67763
Ensembl	ENSG00000161542	ENSMUSG00000015869
UniProt	Q14558	Q9D0M1
RefSeq (mRNA)	NM_002766; NM_001330503; NM_001366236	NM_026364
RefSeq (protein)	NP_001317432; NP_002757; NP_001353165	NP_080640; NP_001391595; NP_001391596; NP_001391597; NP_001391598
Location (UCSC)	Chr 17: 76.31 – 76.38 Mb	Chr 11: 116.36 – 116.39 Mb
PubMed search
- Wikidata
View/Edit Human	View/Edit Mouse

Phosphoribosyl pyrophosphate synthetase-associated protein 1 is an enzyme that in humans is encoded by the PRPSAP1 gene.
