= 5-Hydroxyisourate =

Names
- IUPAC name 5-hydroxy-3,7-dihydropurine-2,6,8-trione

Identifiers
CAS Number	6960-30-1
3D model (JSmol)	Interactive image; Interactive image
ChEBI	CHEBI:18072
ChemSpider	219288
KEGG	C11821
MeSH	5-Hydroxyisourate
PubChem CID	250388
UNII	DU6PJ7L9BX
CompTox Dashboard (EPA)	DTXSID10290591
- InChI: InChI=1S/C5H4N4O4/c10-2-5(13)1(6-3(11)8-2)7-4(12)9-5/h13H,(H3,6,7,8,9,10,11,12) Key: LTQYPAVLAYVKTK-UHFFFAOYSA-N; InChI=1/C5H4N4O4/c10-2-5(13)1(6-3(11)8-2)7-4(12)9-5/h13H,(H3,6,7,8,9,10,11,12) Key: LTQYPAVLAYVKTK-UHFFFAOYAS
- SMILES: C12=NC(=O)NC1(C(=O)NC(=O)N2)O; O=C1NC(=O)N/C2=N/C(=O)NC12O

Properties
Chemical formula	C_{5}H_{4}N_{4}O_{4}
Molar mass	184.11 g/mol
- Except where otherwise noted, data are given for materials in their standard state (at 25 °C [77 °F], 100 kPa). verify (what is ?) Infobox references

5-Hydroxyisourate is an organic compound that is produced by the oxidation of uric acid. The conversion is a major pathway in the antioxidant properties of urate. The conversion is catalysed by urate oxidase.

sequence of oxidation of ureate.

5-Hydroxyisourate rearranges to allantoin.

== See also ==
- Urate oxidase
- Glycolaldehyde
