= Adenine phosphoribosyltransferase deficiency =

- Other names: APRT deficiency or 2,8 Dihydroxyadenine urolithiasis
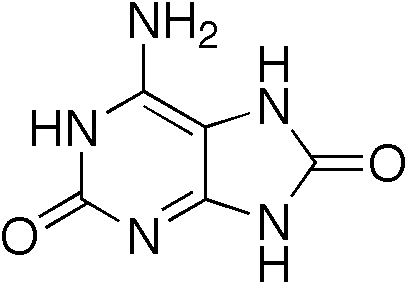
- Dihydroxyadenine, an insoluble purine
- Specialty: Endocrinology
- Symptoms: Kidney and urinary tract stones, Urinary tract infections, blood in the urine, and chronic kidney disease.
- Complications: End-stage renal disease.
- Usual onset: Infancy to late adulthood.
- Types: Type 1 and type 2.
- Causes: Mutations in the APRT gene.
- Diagnostic method: Urine microscopy and kidney stone analysis.
- Differential diagnosis: Uric acid nephrolithiasis, Xanthinuria, and Primary hyperoxaluria.
- Medication: Allopurinol.
- Frequency: 0.4% to 1.2%

Adenine phosphoribosyltransferase deficiency is a rare autosomal recessive metabolic disorder caused by mutations of the APRT gene. Adenine phosphoribosyltransferase (APRT) catalyzes the creation of pyrophosphate and adenosine monophosphate from 5-phosphoribosyl-1-pyrophosphate and adenine. Adenine phosphoribosyltransferase is a purine salvage enzyme. Genetic mutations of adenine phosphoribosyltransferase make large amounts of 2,8-Dihydroxyadenine causing urolithiasis and renal failure.

Adenine phosphoribosyltransferase deficiency has been classified into two types. Type one is caused by mutant alleles of APRT*Q0 and is found in individuals from many different countries. Type one causes a complete deficiency in vivo or in vitro. Type two adenine phosphoribosyltransferase deficiency is caused by mutant alleles of APRT*J results in a full enzyme defiency in vivo but only a partial deficiency in cell extracts. Type two is mainly seen in Japan.

APRT deficiency is often identified by the presence of dihydroxyadenine in urine and kidney stones. Other diagnostic tests for APRT deficiency include urine microscopy, kidney stone analysis, renal biopsy, APRT activity, and genetic testing. Treatment of adenine phosphoribosyltransferase deficiency includes allopurinol and can prevent kidney stones and chronic kidney disease in most patients.

== Signs and symptoms ==
Adenine phosphoribosyltransferase deficiency commonly manifests as symptoms of the kidneys and urinary tract such as nephrolithiasis, urolithiasis, crystalline nephropathy, hematuria, acute kidney injury, chronic kidney disease, and Urinary tract infections. No extrarenal symptoms have been documented.

Adenine phosphoribosyltransferase deficiency can present at any age. Studies have shown that the age of diagnoses can vary from infancy to over the age of 70. Some individuals with APRT deficiency remain completely asymptomatic and only get diagnosed because of familial screening. In 15% of adult cases present with renal failure requiring renal replacement therapy. In some cases APRT deficiency is first diagnosed after a kidney transplant when complications arise. The first kidney stone episode can occur within the first few months of birth or later in life. In infants APRT deficiency may manifest as reddish brown diaper stains.

Patients with APRT deficiency typically have normal levels of plasma uric acid, gout and hyperuricemia have been reported in heterozygotes with a partial APRT deficiency.

=== Complications ===
Dihydroxyadenine crystals precipitate inside the interstitium and renal tubules as well as cause severe kidney damage. Dihydroxyadenine nephropathy can initially present acutely and lead to renal failure within days to weeks. More commonly dihydroxyadenine nephropathy may develop insidiously, causing a progressive decline in kidney function over the span of several years. Dehydration can trigger acute renal failure which causes urine supersaturation, oliguria, and precipitation of dihydroxyadenine.

== Causes ==
Adenine phosphoribosyltransferase deficiency has an autosomal recessive pattern of inheritance.

Adenine phosphoribosyltransferase deficiency is an autosomal recessive condition which means that two copies of the mutated gene must be present for adenine phosphoribosyltransferase deficiency to develop.

=== Genetics ===
The adenine phosphoribosyltransferase (APRT) gene is found on chromosome 16q24, contains five exons, encompasses 2.8 kb of DNA, and has a coding region of 540 bp. Complete APRT deficiency develops in people who carry mutations in both copies of the APRT gene.

There is no evidence that genotype correlates with phenotype and environmental factors or modifiers might be responsible for this heterogeneity.

== Mechanism ==
All tissues express the APRT enzyme, which offers the sole metabolic route for recovering adenine from dietary and polyamine biosynthesis sources. Adenine can only be found in small amounts in blood and urine because APRT catalyzes the conversion of adenine and 5-phosphoribosyl-1-pyrophosphate into inorganic pyrophosphate and 5′-adenosine monophosphate. Adenine is transformed into 8-hydroxyadenine in people without functional APRT, and xanthine dehydrogenase (XDH), formerly known as xanthine oxydase, then further metabolizes this compound to dihydroxyadenine. Due to its high renal clearance, dihydroxyadenine may be secreted tubularly in addition to being filtered. Thus, APRT deficiency causes elevated dihydroxyadenine levels in the urine. Dihydroxyadenine precipitates in renal parenchyma and becomes extremely insoluble in urine, forming crystals that can accumulate, grow, and form stones. This can lead to crystalline nephropathy.

== Diagnosis ==
Adenine phosphoribosyltransferase deficiency is diagnosed based on the identification of dihydroxyadenine by kidney stone analysis or examination of crystals in the urine. The combination of infrared spectroscopy and morphologic examination under a stereomicroscope allows for the identification of dihydroxyadenine in all cases of kidney stones and should be analyzed whenever one becomes available. Biochemical stone analysis is unreliable for diagnosing APRT deficiency and is unable to distinguish dihydroxyadenine from uric acid. For the identification of dihydroxyadenine crystals, light and polarizing microscopy examination of crystalluria is a very helpful, noninvasive, and reasonably priced method. The most concentrated urine samples come from morning urine voids, which are ideal for studying crystalluria. One way to quantify something is to count the number of crystals per volume unit, which is higher in patients who are not receiving treatment.

== See also ==
- Nucleotide salvage – Biological process
- Purine metabolism – Chemical reactions and pathways involving lysis of purine nucleotides
