= Aldehyde oxidase and xanthine dehydrogenase, a/b hammerhead domain =

Identifiers
- Symbol: Ald_Xan_dh_C
- Pfam: PF01315
- InterPro: IPR000674
- SCOP2: 1alo / SCOPe / SUPFAM
Available protein structures:
- Pfam: structures / ECOD
- PDB: RCSB PDB; PDBe; PDBj
- PDBsum: structure summary
- PDB: 1t3qE:28-142 1n5wE:35-144 1zxiB:35-144 1n60B:35-144 1n63E:35-144 1n62E:35-144 1n61E:35-144 1sb3D:25-131 1rm6A:25-131 1wygA:587-693 1v97B:587-693 1n5xA:587-693 1fo4B:587-693 1vdvB:587-693 1fiqC:587-693 1dgjA:203-308 1sijA:192-308 1vlbA:192-308

The aldehyde oxidase and xanthine dehydrogenase, α/β hammerhead domain is an evolutionary conserved protein domain. Both aldehyde oxidase (AOX) and xanthine dehydrogenase (XDH) contain this domain, along with other enzymes of the xanthine oxidase family. The domain is a part of the molybdo-flavoenzyme family, and its shape contributes to the organization of the electron transfer occurring during the aldehyde oxidase and xanthine dehydrogenase catalytic cycle.

== Structure ==
The α/β hammerhead domain is found in aldehyde oxidase and xanthine dehydrogenase. This domain has an α/β protein fold which are made up of alpha helices and beta sheets that are configured in a hammerhead shape. They serve to help with the overall organization for the substrates within the active site, and stabilize the catalytic cofactors during electron transfer. The catalytic cofactors active during electron transfer are molybdenum cofactor (MoCo), two [2Fe-2S] clusters, and flavin adenine dinucleotide (FAD). MoCo is where the substrate binds and is oxidized, passing electrons to the molybdenum atom. The electrons then move through the two [2Fe-2S] clusters to the FAD, which is the final electron acceptor.

== Function ==
Aldehyde oxidase (EC 1.2.3.1) catalyzes the conversion of an aldehyde in the presence of oxygen and water to an acid and hydrogen peroxide. The enzyme is a homodimer, and requires FAD, molybdenum and two 2FE-2S clusters as cofactors. Xanthine dehydrogenase (EC 1.1.1.204) catalyzes the hydrogenation of xanthine to urate, and also requires FAD, molybdenum and two 2FE-2S clusters as cofactors. This activity is often found in a bifunctional enzyme with xanthine oxidase (EC 1.1.3.22) activity too. The enzyme can be converted from the dehydrogenase form to the oxidase form irreversibly by proteolysis or reversibly through oxidation of sulfhydryl groups. After electrons reach FAD in the dehydrogenase form, FAD reduces NAD+ to NADH. In oxidase form the FAD gives the electrons to oxygen molecules, which ends up making superoxide or hydrogen peroxide.

== Species distribution ==
The aldehyde oxidase and xanthine dehydrogenase, a/b hammerhead domain is found in many prokaryotic and eukaryotic organisms, in enzymes of the AOX and XDH families. Humans, plants, bacteria, and insects like fruit flies all have been identified molybdo-flavoenzymes, which have this domain.

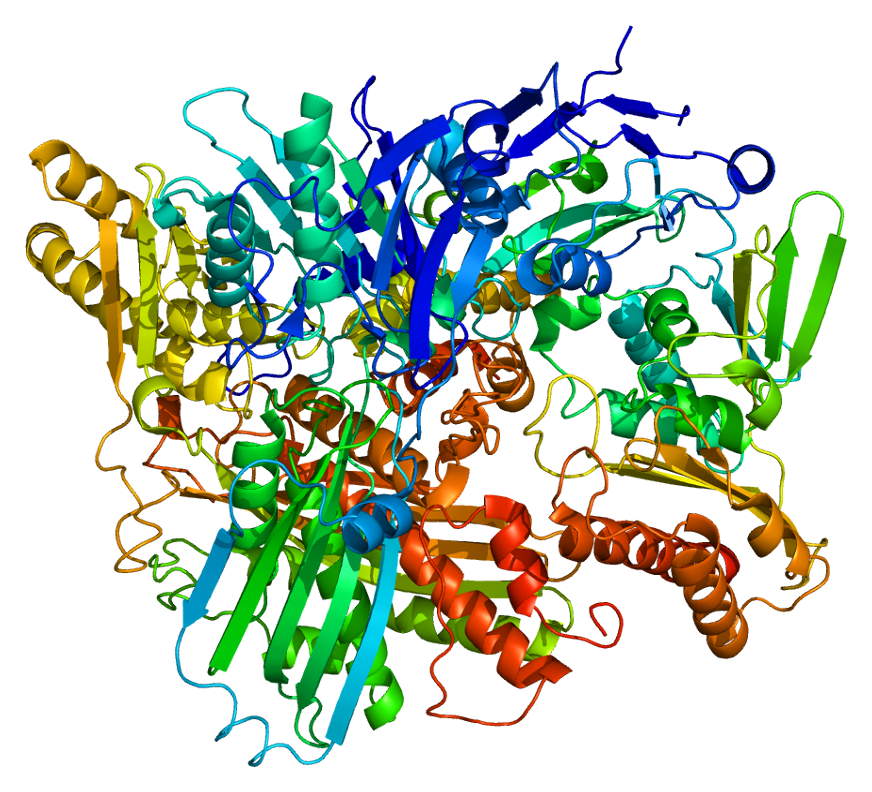
Xanthine Dehydrogenase

== Clinical significance ==
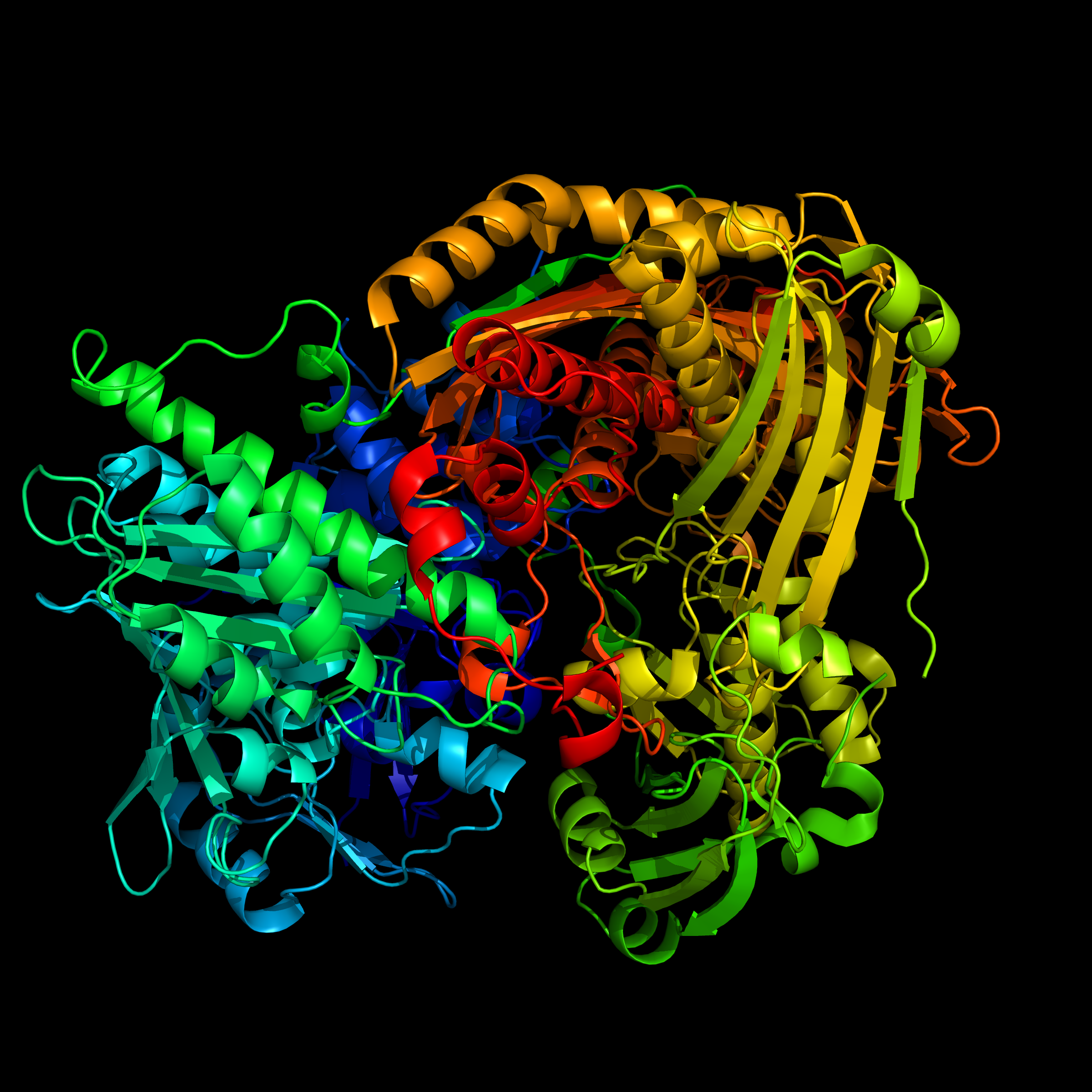
Model of human Aldehyde Oxidase after PDB

For humans xanthine dehydrogenase play a major role when tissue perfusion is disrupted. During normal perfusion xanthine dehydrogenase usually functions in purine metabolism which doesn't produce many oxidative byproducts. However, in low oxygen or ischemic conditions, xanthine dehydrogenase is converted to xanthine oxidase by proteolysis. Upon oxygen restoration, xanthine oxidase creates reactive oxygen species, especially superoxide and hydrogen peroxide. Superoxide and hydrogen peroxide can lead to endothelial injury, impair microvascular function, and amplify inflammation. This contributes to the chain reaction that leads to ischemia-reperfusion damage occurring after events such as myocardial infarction. Outside of perfusion related injury, mutations in the genes that encode for and xanthine dehydrogenase can lead to different disorders. Changes in the function of xanthine dehydrogenase can cause type I or type II xanthinuria, which can cause renal failure and kindey stones.

== See also ==
Aldehyde oxidase 1

Xanthine dehydrogenase

Xanthine oxidase
