= Nyhan =

Nyhan is a surname. Notable people with the surname include:

- Brendan Nyhan (born 1978), American liberal to moderate political blogger, author, and political columnist
- David Nyhan (1940–2005), American journalist
- Denis Nyhan (1939–2021), New Zealand driver of standardbred racehorses at premier racing events
- William Nyhan (1926–2026), American physician

== See also ==
- Lesch–Nyhan syndrome (LNS), a rare, inherited disorder caused by a deficiency of the enzyme hypoxanthine-guanine phosphoribosyltransferase
- Sakati–Nyhan–Tisdale syndrome, a rare genetic disorder associated with abnormalities in the leg bones, congenital heart defects and craniofacial defects
