= Enzyme-thiol transhydrogenase (glutathione-disulfide) =

enzyme-thiol transhydrogenase (glutathione-disulfide)

Identifiers
- EC no.: 1.8.4.7
- CAS no.: 85030-79-1

Databases
- IntEnz: IntEnz view
- BRENDA: BRENDA entry
- ExPASy: NiceZyme view
- KEGG: KEGG entry
- MetaCyc: metabolic pathway
- PRIAM: profile
- PDB structures: RCSB PDB PDBe PDBsum
- Gene Ontology: AmiGO / QuickGO
Search
- PMC: articles
- PubMed: articles
- NCBI: proteins

In enzymology, an enzyme-thiol transhydrogenase (glutathione-disulfide) (EC 1.8.4.7) is an enzyme that catalyzes the chemical reaction

[xanthine dehydrogenase] + glutathione disulfide $\rightleftharpoons$ [xanthine oxidase] + 2 glutathione

Thus, the two substrates of this enzyme are xanthine dehydrogenase and glutathione disulfide, whereas its two products are xanthine oxidase and glutathione.

This enzyme belongs to the family of oxidoreductases, specifically those acting on a sulfur group of donors with a disulfide as acceptor. The systematic name of this enzyme class is [xanthine-dehydrogenase]:glutathione-disulfide S-oxidoreductase. Other names in common use include [xanthine-dehydrogenase]:oxidized-glutathione S-oxidoreductase, enzyme-thiol transhydrogenase (oxidized-glutathione), glutathione-dependent thiol:disulfide oxidoreductase, and thiol:disulfide oxidoreductase. This enzyme participates in glutathione metabolism.
