= J. Edwin Seegmiller =

American physician

- Born: Jarvis Edwin Seegmiller; June 22, 1920; St. George, Utah
- Died: May 31, 2006 (aged 85); La Jolla, California
- Other name: Jay Seegmiller
- Education: University of Utah, University of Chicago (MedD, 1948)
- Known for: Discovering the biochemical basis of the Lesch–Nyhan syndrome.
- Awards: Distinguished Service Award, United States Public Health Service (USPHS);
- Scientific career
- Fields: Medicine, biochemical genetics, rheumatology
- Workplaces: Johns Hopkins Hospital; National Institutes of Health (NIH); Harvard Medical School; Public Health Research Institute of the New York City; University of California, San Diego

J(arvis) Edwin Seegmiller, or Jay Seegmiller, (June 22, 1920 – May 31, 2006) was an American physician and biochemical geneticist best known for his role in discovering the biochemical basis of the Lesch–Nyhan syndrome. He was a rheumatologist and a pioneer in research on arthritic diseases and on aging.

== Life ==
Jay Seegmiller was born into a Latter-day Saint family in the small town of St. George in southwestern Utah. He attended the University of Utah in Salt Lake City where he majored in chemistry and graduated with a bachelor's degree in 1942. He then served in the US Army. After the war, he went to medical school and received his Doctor of Medicine degree with honors from the University of Chicago in 1948. After an internship at Johns Hopkins Hospital in Baltimore, he trained at the National Institute of Arthritis and Metabolic Disease (NIAMD), a part of the National Institutes of Health (NIH) in Bethesda, Maryland.

He then worked as a research associate at the Thorndike Memorial Laboratory at Harvard Medical School and as a visiting investigator at the Public Health Research Institute of the City of New York. Seegmiller returned to NIH in 1954. He was appointed senior investigator at NIAMD, and in time became Chief of Human Biochemical Genetics.

In 1969 Seegmiller started on his second career. He left NIH to become a founding faculty member of the new Medical School of the University of California, San Diego (UCSD) and became the first head of the Arthritis Division of the Department of Medicine.

Seegmiller embarked on his third and last career in 1983 when he was appointed founding Director of the Stein Institute for Research on Aging (SIRA) at UCSD.

Seegmiller was given the United States Public Health (USPHS) Distinguished Service Award in 1969. He was elected to the National Academy of Sciences in 1972 and to the National Academy of Arts and Sciences in 1982. He was honored as Master of the American College of Rheumatology (ACR) in 1992.

Jay Seegmiller died after a brief respiratory illness in La Jolla, California. He was survived by his second wife Barbara (his first wife Roberta died in 1992), 2 sons, 2 daughters, 7 grandchildren, and 2 great-grandchildren.

== Biochemical genetics ==
=== Lesch–Nyhan syndrome ===
In 1964 medical student Michael Lesch and pediatric faculty member Bill Nyhan at Johns Hopkins Hospital reported finding an X-linked recessive disorder in two young brothers with progressive mental retardation and a bizarre tendency to self-mutilation. Because the boys had abnormally high blood levels of uric acid, Lesch and Nyhan called it A familial disorder of uric acid metabolism and central nervous system function.

It was only three years until the biochemical basis of the disease was identified by Jay Seegmiller and his colleagues at NIH. They discovered that this rare genetic disease, Lesch–Nyhan syndrome, was due to a profound deficiency of an enzyme known as hypoxanthine guanine phosphoribosyltransferase, or HGPRT, for short.

=== Kelley–Seegmiller syndrome ===
Seegmiller's laboratory team at NIH went on to discover that some men have partial HGPRT deficiency that causes high levels of uric acid in the blood and leads to the development of gouty arthritis and the formation of uric acid stones in the urinary tract. This condition has been named Kelley–Seegmiller syndrome.
