= Michael Lesch =

American physician (1939–2008)

- Born: June 30, 1939; New York City, New York, United States
- Died: March 19, 2008 (aged 68); Argentina
- Occupation: Physician

Michael Lesch (June 30, 1939 – March 19, 2008) was an American physician and medical educator who helped identify an important genetic disorder associated with intellectual disability and self-mutilation. This disease is now known as the Lesch–Nyhan syndrome. In the mid-1960s when the syndrome was discovered, Lesch was a research associate working at the Laboratory of General and Comparative Biochemistry at the NIH National Institute of Mental Health in Bethesda, Maryland. William Nyhan, a pediatrician and biochemical geneticist, was his mentor. Lesch was 30 years old when he discovered the disease.

Lesch completed his medical training at Johns Hopkins in the Osler Medical Service in 1964. While at Hopkins he earned the distinguished honor of president, Alpha Omega Alpha, The Johns Hopkins University Chapter.

== Biography ==
Michael Lesch was born in 1939 in Queens in New York City. He attended Columbia University, attaining Phi Beta Kappa during his junior year and graduating summa cum laude, before entering medical school at Johns Hopkins School of Medicine. After receiving his medical degree, Lesch became an internist and specialized in cardiology.

In the 1970s Lesch distinguished himself early on in Boston, Massachusetts, at the Peter Bent Brigham Hospital and the Harvard Medical School. In 1971-72 he was appointed chief resident at the Brigham Hospital. Between the years of 1974–1976, he became an associate professor of medicine at the Harvard Medical School and the director of the S.A. Levine Cardiac Center at the Peter Bent Brigham Hospital.

In 1976, he moved with his family from Boston to Chicago, where he took the position of Chief, Section of Cardiology, Northwestern University Medical School, Northwestern Memorial Hospital, Chicago, Illinois, a position he held for 12 years. At age 37, he was one of the youngest Section Chiefs ever appointed at Northwestern in the Department of Cardiology.

During his tenure in Chicago, he held the position of Vice President of the Chicago Heart Association from 1978–80. From 1982-1983 he was the president of the Chicago Heart Association. In 1982 he was also listed for the first time in the Annuals of Who's Who in America. In 1983–85, he was appointed to the board of trustees, University Space Research Association (NASA). From 1984–87, Lesch was asked to chair the Chicago Heart Association's Cardiac Exhibition Committee at the Chicago Museum of Science and Industry. That Committee developed a four-chamber heart that museum visitors could walk-thru to better understand the heart's physiology. In 1988, Lesch was awarded The Heart of the Year Award, from the Metropolitan Chicago Chapter of the American Heart Association.

In 1989, Lesch moved to Michigan, where he became chairman of the Department of Medicine at the Henry Ford Hospital and Health System until 1998. In 1993 he was appointed to the board of trustees at the Henry Ford Hospital.

In 1998, Lesch was named chairman of Department of Medicine at St. Luke's-Roosevelt Hospital Center (now Mount Sinai Morningside) in New York City and Professor of Medicine there at the Columbia University College of Physicians and Surgeons. A position he held until his death in 2008. In 1999 he was appointed to the board of trustees, St. Luke's-Roosevelt Hospital Center and in 2002 he became the Medical Director for the Cardiac Service Line at Continuum Health Partners.

During his career, Lesch lectured and taught extensively as a visiting professor abroad. In 1977 he was a visiting Professor of Cardiology at the Sree Chitra Tirunal Medical Center in Trivandrum, India. In 1984 he was an invited lecturer at the International Symposium on Stress and Heart Disease in Winnipeg, Canada. In 1986 Dr Lesch became a Fulbright Visiting Professor of Cardiology at the Egyptian Cardiology Society and a Fulbright Visiting Professor of Cardiology, at the Portuguese Society of Cardiology. That same year, Lesch was named an Honorary Member of the Portuguese Society of Cardiology. In 1993, Lesch was a visiting Professor of Cardiology at the Universidad Peruana Cayetano Heredia in Lima, Peru. In 1999, Lesch was a visiting Cardiologist at the Sakakibara Heart Institute in Tokyo, Japan. And in 2000, he was a Visiting Professor of Cardiology, at the Tohoku University School of Medicine in Sendai, Japan.

Lesch earned the distinction of being listed in the annals of The Best Doctors in America starting in 2003, an honor he retained every year until his death.

Lesch was a prolific writer, publisher and editor. From 1971 until his death, he was the co-editor of the periodical, Progress in Cardiovascular Diseases. From 1975-76 he was an Associate Editor at The New England Journal of Medicine. From 1976-79 he was on the Editorial Board of Cardiovascular Medicine. From 1978-82 he was on the Editorial Board of the American Journal of Cardiology. From 1980-92 he was on the Editorial Board of American Heart Journal. From 1987-96 he was on the Editorial Board of the American Journal of Cardiac Imaging. From 1996 until his death, he was on the Editorial Board, American Journal of Geriatric Cardiology.

Lesch was also an avid fly fisherman who fished the lakes and rivers of Canada, Alaska, Chile, the Arctic, the Amazon and Argentina.

Lesch died unexpectedly in his sleep while in Argentina on a fishing trip to the Gallegos River. He is survived by his wife, Bella Lesch, two children (Leah Lesch and Ian Lesch) and six grandchildren.
