= Transphosphoribosidase =

Transphosphoribosidase may refer to the following enzymes:

- Adenine phosphoribosyltransferase
- Hypoxanthine phosphoribosyltransferase
