= C5H5N5O2 =

The molecular formula C_{5}H_{5}N_{5}O_{2} (molar mass: 167.13 g/mol, exact mass: 67.0443) u may refer to:

- 2,8-Dihydroxyadenine
- 8-Oxoguanine (8-oxo-Gua)
