= 2,8-Dihydroxyadenine =

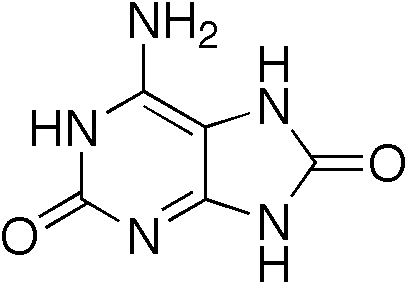

Names
- Preferred IUPAC name 6-Amino-1H-purine-2,8(7H,9H)-dione

Identifiers
CAS Number	30377-37-8
3D model (JSmol)	Interactive image
ChEBI	CHEBI:183641
ChemSpider	83302
ECHA InfoCard	100.045.584
MeSH	2,8-dihydroxyadenine
PubChem CID	92268
UNII	MYE4YC3VKU
CompTox Dashboard (EPA)	DTXSID80184453
- InChI: InChI=1S/C5H5N5O2/c6-2-1-3(9-4(11)7-1)10-5(12)8-2/h(H5,6,7,8,9,10,11,12) Key: XFBOJHLYDJZYSP-UHFFFAOYSA-N; InChI=1/C5H5N5O2/c6-2-1-3(9-4(11)7-1)10-5(12)8-2/h(H5,6,7,8,9,10,11,12) Key: XFBOJHLYDJZYSP-UHFFFAOYAF
- SMILES: O=C2N/C/1=N/C(=O)N\C(=C\1N2)N

Properties
Chemical formula	C_{5}H_{5}N_{5}O_{2}
Molar mass	167.126
- Except where otherwise noted, data are given for materials in their standard state (at 25 °C [77 °F], 100 kPa). verify (what is ?) Infobox references

2,8-Dihydroxyadenine is a derivative of adenine which accumulates in 2,8 dihydroxy-adenine urolithiasis. The poorly soluble purine 2,8-dihydroxyadenine is excreted in the urine because of a deficiency in the adenine salvage enzyme adenine phosphoribosyltransferase. The defect is inherited as an autosomal recessive trait; the homozygous state is associated with high urinary levels of 2,8-dihydroxyadenine and with crystalluria, calculus formation, and potential nephrotoxicity. The condition primarily presents as renal obstructive disease, but some patients have presented with advanced kidney failure. Allopurinol therapy appears to be effective. 2, 8-dihydroxyadenine formation can be easily controlled with allopurinol, which is administered in a dose of 300 mg/day in adults (10 mg/kg/day in children) in the absence of kidney failure.
