= Shamima Rahman =

British paediatrician and scientist (born 1964)

Shamima Rahman (born 1964) is a Nigeria-born British paediatrician, scientist, and academic. She is the professor of paediatric metabolic medicine at the University College London Great Ormond Street Institute of Child Health and an honorary consultant at Great Ormond Street Hospital, London. Her research focuses on elucidating the genetic basis for paediatric mitochondrial and rare metabolic diseases, and developing novel pharmacological and genetic therapies to address these currently incurable disorders.

== Early life and education ==
Rahman's parents, after qualifying as doctors, worked in northern Nigeria close to the Sahara desert, where she was born in 1964. When she was a few months old, the family emigrated to the United Kingdom so her father could train in tropical medicine at the London School of Hygiene and Tropical Medicine in Bloomsbury. Since her parents were junior doctors, undertaking six-monthly contractual engagements, the family moved a lot when Rahman was a child. She attended ten different primary schools, before joining the Nottingham Girls' High School (NGHS), a private girls-only day school in Nottinghamshire, England in 1975. According to Rahman, institutionalised racism impeded her parents' career progression.

Rahman's intake at NGHS coincided with the termination of the Direct Grant Scheme under which a quarter of enrolments in the England and Wales secondary schools were directly funded by the central government. Despite NGHS choosing to become independent, Rahman secured a full scholarship to attend the school. She travelled to NGHS by bus, and was unable to participate in after-school extracurricular activities owing to the long commute. Rahman credits her mother was encouraging her to pursue medicine. The school supported her preparation for Oxbridge.

In the late 1980s, Rahman trained in medicine at the University of Oxford, England. While pursuing her undergraduate degree, she worked in a Haemophilia centre laboratory which introduced her to the prospect of medical research. She was awarded the 1985 Martin Wronker Prize for Medicine for her performance in pre-clinical medicine.

After qualifying as a doctor in 1988, she worked as a house officer for 120 hours a week, spending alternate nights on call. She later trained in paediatrics at the Royal Hospital for Sick Children, Edinburgh and Great Ormond Street Hospital (GOSH), London. While at Great Ormond Street, she was awarded a scholarship by the Royal Children's Hospital Research Foundation to spend a year at the Murdoch Institute in Melbourne, Australia.

Rahman returned to England in 1994 and completed her paediatric training at the John Radcliffe Hospital, Oxfordshire before joining the Medical Research Council clinical training fellowship at the UCL Great Ormond Street Institute of Child Health (UCL ICH), London to undertake a PhD in molecular medicine. She studied the molecular basis of cytochrome c oxidase deficiency in childhood under the expert supervision of James Leonard and Anthony Schapira. She also received additional funding for her doctoral thesis work from Children Living with Inherited Metabolic Diseases (formerly known as Research Trust for Metabolic Diseases in Children).

In 2000, during a Clinical Lectureship at the UCL ICH, Rahman completed her specialist training in paediatric metabolic medicine, and founded the Mitochondrial Research Group for improved diagnosis and management of mitochondrial and metabolic diseases presenting in children. In 2006, she was awarded a Department of Health (DH)-Higher Education Funding Council for England (HEFCE) Best Research for Best Health Clinical Senior Lectureship. She was subsequently promoted to reader at UCL ICH and then professor in 2014. She was selected for two fellowships at the Royal College of Paediatrics and Child Health and Royal College of Physicians in 2008 and 2011 respectively.

== Research ==
In 1999, Rahman was part of the research team funded by Wellcome Trust that reported the "first missense mutation in the mtDNA gene for subunit II of cytochrome c oxidase (COX)." The study identified the mutation in a 14-year-old boy suffering from proximal myopathy and lactic acidosis.

She runs the Mitochondrial Research Group at UCL ICH that focuses on improving the "outcomes for children with mitochondrial and other metabolic diseases" through the discovery of mitochondrial disease genes, development of novel computational diagnostic strategies and therapeutic approaches in the absence of effective treatments. The Group has conducted several long-term projects that implement an integrative genomics approach to "identify novel nuclear genes and gene variants responsible for human mitochondrial disease." In addition to elucidating new disease mechanisms, the Group has discovered new disease genes, in particular a complex I assembly factor and genes needed for mitochondrial DNA maintenance, biosynthesis of coenzyme Q10 and mitochondrial homeostasis. A number of small molecule therapies for mitochondrial disease have also been evaluated, including vitamins and cofactors, decanoic acid, and nonsense readthrough agents; the Group is in the process of developing a gene therapy programme to address these disorders. Rahman currently leads an National Institute for Health and Care Research (NIHR)-funded study on ClinGen gene curations and contributes to ClinVar variant curations for primary mitochondrial diseases.

Since its inception, the projects undertaken by the Group have provided genetic diagnoses for hundreds of patients referred from and beyond GOSH, leading to an increased diagnostic rate in a research setting (from 5 percent 20 years ago to approximately 70 percent in the present day). They have also contributed to the development of in silico resources, such as the international classification of inherited metabolic disease (ICIMD) and the Leigh Syndrome Map, for mitochondrial and other inherited metabolic diseases.

== Other engagements ==
She is the editor-in-chief of Journal of Inherited Metabolic Disease (JMID) and JIMD Reports, and a senior editor of Annals of Human Genetics.

She was part of the UCL ICH team that received the Equality Challenge Unit (ECU)'s Athena SWAN charter Silver award in 2013.

== Selected publications ==
- Keegan, Anna; Cetin, Ozge; Chilcott, Ellie M.; Diaz, Juan Antinao; Eaton, Simon; Waddington, Simon N.; Counsell, John R.; Rahman, Shamima; Karda, Rajvinder (2025-08-01), Next Generation AAV-F Capsid gene therapy rescues disease pathology in a model of Pyruvate Dehydrogenase Complex Deficiency, bioRxiv, doi:10.1101/2025.07.30.667478, retrieved 2025-09-14
- Zhang, Fangfang; Dorn, Tatjana; Gnutti, Barbara; Anikster, Yair; Kuebler, Sarah; Ahrens-Nicklas, Rebecca; Gosselin, Rachel; Rahman, Shamima; Durst, Ronen; Zanuttigh, Enrica; Güra, Miriam A.; Poch, Christine M.; Meier, Anna B.; Laugwitz, Karl-Ludwig; Schüller, Hans-Joachim (2025-07-31). "Pantethine ameliorates dilated cardiomyopathy features in PPCS deficiency disorder in patients and cell line models". Communications Medicine. 5 (1): 323. doi:10.1038/s43856-025-01017-z. ISSN 2730-664X
- Gregory, L. C.; Krywawych, S.; Rahman, S.; Lagos, Carlos F.; Eaton, S.; Dattani, M. T. (2025-07-01). "A complex multisystem disorder including hypopituitarism and hypoparathyroidism, associated with mutation in the gene encoding fatty acid synthase (FASN)". Metabolism - Clinical and Experimental. 168. doi:10.1016/j.metabol.2025.156256. ISSN 0026–0495. PMID 40185395.
- Rahman, Shamima; Baruteau, Julien (2025). "First in Human Gene Editing for an Inherited Metabolic Disease". Journal of Inherited Metabolic Disease. 48 (4): e70056. doi:10.1002/jimd.70056. ISSN 1573–2665.
- Ball, Megan; van Bergen, Nicole J.; Compton, Alison G.; Thorburn, David R.; Rahman, Shamima; Christodoulou, John (2025). "Therapies for Mitochondrial Disease: Past, Present, and Future". Journal of Inherited Metabolic Disease. 48(4): e70065. doi:10.1002/jimd.70065. ISSN 1573–2665. PMC 12301291. PMID 40714961.
