= Tigulixostat =

Chemical compound

Clinical data
- Other names: LC-350189

Legal status
- Legal status: Investigational

Identifiers
- IUPAC name: 1-(3-cyano-1-propan-2-ylindol-5-yl)pyrazole-4-carboxylic acid
- CAS Number: 1287766-55-5
- PubChem CID: 51039100
- DrugBank: DB18799
- ChemSpider: 58954780
- UNII: WZ0PYQ6VLU
- ChEMBL: ChEMBL3652780

Chemical and physical data
- Formula: C_{16}H_{14}N_{4}O_{2}
- Molar mass: 294.314 g·mol^{−1}
- 3D model (JSmol): Interactive image
- SMILES: CC(C)N1C=C(C2=C1C=CC(=C2)N3C=C(C=N3)C(=O)O)C#N
- InChI: InChI=1S/C16H14N4O2/c1-10(2)19-8-11(6-17)14-5-13(3-4-15(14)19)20-9-12(7-18-20)16(21)22/h3-5,7-10H,1-2H3,(H,21,22); Key:JLQQRYOWGCIMMZ-UHFFFAOYSA-N

Tigulixostat is an investigational new drug that is being evaluated for the treatment of gout. It is a xanthine oxidase inhibitor.
