= C5H4N4O2 =

The molecular formula C_{5}H_{4}N_{4}O_{2} (molar mass: 152.11 g/mol, exact mass: 152.0334 u) may refer to:

- Xanthine, a purine base
- Oxypurinol, an inhibitor of xanthine oxidase
