= MOCOS =

Protein-coding gene in the species Homo sapiens

Identifiers
- Aliases: MOCOS, hMCS, MCS, MOS, molybdenum cofactor sulfurase
- External IDs: OMIM: 613274; MGI: 1915841; GeneCards: MOCOS
Enzyme activity
EC #	BRENDA	ExPASy	KEGG	MetaCyc
2.8.1.9	↗	↗	↗	↗

Gene location (Human)
Chr.	Chromosome 18 (human)
Band	18q12.2	Start	36,187,497 bp
Band	18q12.2	End	36,272,157 bp

Gene location (Mouse)
Chr.	Chromosome 18 (mouse)
Band	18|18 A2	Start	24,786,748 bp
Band	18|18 A2	End	24,834,632 bp
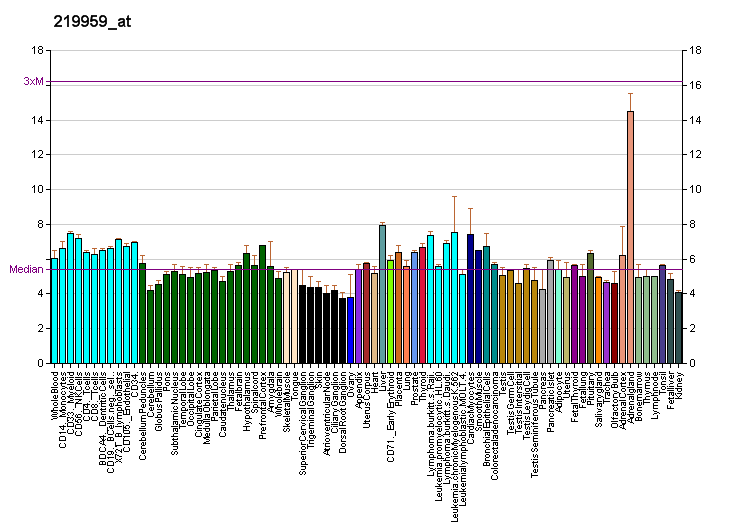
RNA expression pattern
Bgee	Human / Mouse (ortholog); Top expressed in: secondary oocyte; right lobe of liver; palpebral conjunctiva; right adrenal gland; right adrenal cortex; jejunal mucosa; left adrenal gland; left adrenal cortex; buccal mucosa cell; duodenum / Top expressed in: granulocyte; left lobe of liver; esophagus; primary oocyte; jejunum; gastrula; respiratory epithelium; olfactory system; olfactory epithelium; duodenum; More reference expression data
BioGPS	More reference expression data
Gene ontology
Molecular function	transferase activity; molybdenum ion binding; pyridoxal phosphate binding; protein binding; catalytic activity; Mo-molybdopterin cofactor sulfurase activity; molybdenum cofactor sulfurtransferase activity; lyase activity
Cellular component	cytosol; cellular component
Biological process	Mo-molybdopterin cofactor biosynthetic process; molybdopterin cofactor biosynthetic process; molybdopterin cofactor metabolic process
Sources:Amigo / QuickGO
Orthologs
Databases	NCBI: entry; OMA: entry
Species	Human	Mouse
Entrez	55034	68591
Ensembl	ENSG00000075643	ENSMUSG00000039616
UniProt	Q96EN8	Q14CH1
RefSeq (mRNA)	NM_017947	NM_026779
RefSeq (protein)	NP_060417	NP_081055
Location (UCSC)	Chr 18: 36.19 – 36.27 Mb	Chr 18: 24.79 – 24.83 Mb
PubMed search
- Wikidata
View/Edit Human	View/Edit Mouse

Molybdenum cofactor sulfurase is an enzyme that in humans is encoded by the MOCOS gene.

MOCOS sulfurates the molybdenum cofactor of xanthine dehydrogenase (XDH) and aldehyde oxidase (AOX1), which is required for their enzymatic activities.
