= Aldehyde oxidase =

Enzyme

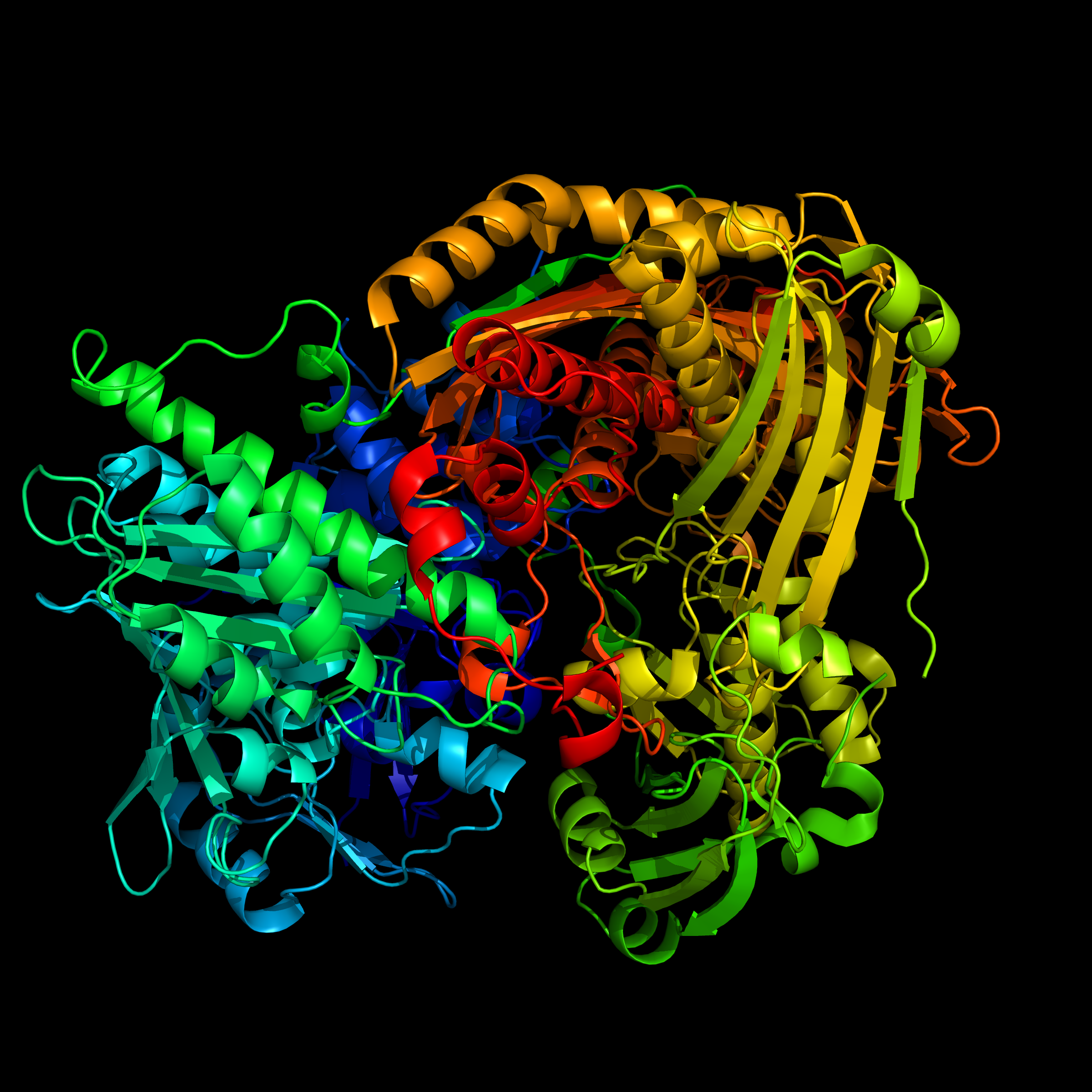
- Model of human aldehyde oxidase after PDB: 4UHW.

Identifiers
- EC no.: 1.2.3.1
- CAS no.: 9029-07-6

Databases
- BRENDA: enzyme data
- ExPASy: NiceZyme view
- KEGG: enzyme entry
- MetaCyc: metabolic pathway
- Rhea: reactions
- PDB structures: RCSB PDB PDBe PDBsum
- Gene Ontology: AmiGO / QuickGO
Search
- PMC: articles
- PubMed: articles
- NCBI: proteins

aldehyde oxidase 1

Identifiers
- Symbol: AOX1
- NCBI gene: 316
- HGNC: 553
- OMIM: 602841
- RefSeq: NM_001159
- UniProt: Q06278

Other data
- EC number: 1.2.3.1
- Locus: Chr. 2 q33
Search for
- Structures: Swiss-model
- Domains: InterPro

Aldehyde oxidase (AO) is a metabolizing enzyme, located in the cytosolic compartment of tissues in many organisms. AO catalyzes the oxidation of aldehydes into carboxylic acid, and in addition, catalyzes the hydroxylation of some heterocycles. It can also catalyze the oxidation of both cytochrome P450 and monoamine oxidase (MAO) intermediate products. AO plays an important role in the metabolism of several drugs.

== Reaction ==
AO catalyzes the conversion of an aldehyde in the presence of oxygen and water to an acid and hydrogen peroxide.

- an aldehyde + H_{2}O + O_{2} ⇌ a carboxylate + H_{2}O_{2} + H^{+}

Though the enzyme uses molecular oxygen as an electron acceptor, the oxygen atom that is incorporated into the carboxylate product is from water; however, the exact mechanism of reduction is still not known for AO.

The AO also catalyzes the oxidation of heterocycles, which involves a nucleophilic attack located at the carbon atom beside the heteroatom. This means that susceptibility to nucleophilic attack of a heterocycle determines if that heterocycle is a suitable substrate for AO.

== Species distribution ==
Aldehyde oxidase is a member of the molybdenum flavoprotein family and has a very complex evolutionary profile—as the genes of AO varies according to animal species. Higher primates, such as humans, have a single functioning AO gene (AOX1), whereas rodents have four separate AOX genes. The human population has both functionally inactive hAOX1 allelic variants and encoding enzyme variants with different catalytic activities. AO activity has been found to be much more active in higher primates (compared to rodents), though many factors may affect this activity, such as gender, age, cigarette smoking, drug usage, and disease states.

== Tissue distribution ==
Aldehyde oxidase is very concentrated in the liver, where it oxidizes multiple aldehydes and nitrogenous heterocyclic compounds, such as anti-cancer and immunosuppressive drugs. Some AO activity has been located in other parts of the body—including the lungs (epithelial cells and alveolar cells), the kidneys, and the gastrointestinal tract (small and large intestines).

== Regulation ==
The regulation of expression of AO is still not completely known, though some studies have shown that the AOX1 gene is regulated by the Nrf2 pathway. Some known inhibitors of AO are sterol and phenol compounds, like estradiol. Others include amsacrine, 6,6'-azopurine, chlorpromazine, cimetidine, cyanide, diethylstilbestrol, genestein, isovanillin, and methadone.

== Structure ==
AO is very similar in amino acid sequence to xanthine oxidase (XO). The active sites of AO has been found to have a superimposed structure to that of XO, in studies involving mouse liver. AO is a homodimer, and requires FAD, molybdenum (MoCo) and two 2Fe-2S clusters as cofactors. These two 2Fe-2S cofactors each bind to the two distinct 150-kDa monomers of AO. Three separate domains harbor these three requirements. There is a 20 kDa N-terminal which binds to the two 2Fe-2S cofactors, a 40 kDa domain which provides a means of binding to the FAD, and a C-terminal which houses the molybdenum.

== Role in drug metabolism ==
Aldehyde oxidase is thought to have a significant impact on pharmacokinetics. AO is capable of oxidizing many drugs in the liver (such as N-1-methylnicotinamide, N-methylphthalazinium, benzaldehyde, retinal, and vanillin), because of its broad substrate specificity. AO greatly contributes to the hepatic clearance of drugs and other compounds. For example, cytoplasmic AOX1 a key enzyme in the hepatic phase I metabolism of several xenobiotics. For this reason, AOX genes are becoming increasingly important to both understand and control in the therapeutic drug industry. Pfizer TLR7 agonist program has found several techniques to switch the AO metabolism off. Examples of drugs metabolized primarily by aldehyde oxidase are Zaleplon, Ziprasidone, and methotrexate. These drugs are also metabolized by P450 enzymes, and one study could not find any known compounds metabolized purely by AO. The birth control drug Ethinyl estradiol inhibits AO, but its typical concentration is so low that the potential for drug-drug interaction is essentially zero. A select few medications have been identified as potentially significant inhibitors of AO, including Clozapine and Chlorpromazine.

== See also ==
- Aldehyde oxidase and xanthine dehydrogenase, a/b hammerhead domain
