= Oxipurinol =

Names
- Preferred IUPAC name 1H-pyrazolo[3,4-d]pyrimidine-4,6(2H,5H)-dione
- Other names 2,5-Dihydro-1H-pyrazolo[3,4-d]pyrimidine-4,6-dione; Alloxanthine

Identifiers
CAS Number	2465-59-0
3D model (JSmol)	Interactive image
Beilstein Reference	139956
ChEBI	CHEBI:28315
ChEMBL	ChEMBL859
ChemSpider	4483
ECHA InfoCard	100.017.792
EC Number	219-570-9
KEGG	C07599
MeSH	Oxypurinol
PubChem CID	4644
UNII	G97OZE5068
CompTox Dashboard (EPA)	DTXSID4035209
- InChI: InChI=1S/C5H4N4O2/c10-4-2-1-6-9-3(2)7-5(11)8-4/h1H,(H3,6,7,8,9,10,11) Key: HXNFUBHNUDHIGC-UHFFFAOYSA-N
- SMILES: O=C1NC(=O)C2=CNNC2=N1

Properties
Chemical formula	C_{5}H_{4}N_{4}O_{2}
Molar mass	152.11086
Appearance	white crystals
- Except where otherwise noted, data are given for materials in their standard state (at 25 °C [77 °F], 100 kPa). Infobox references

Oxipurinol (INN, or oxypurinol USAN) is an inhibitor of xanthine oxidase. It is an active metabolite of allopurinol and it is cleared renally. In cases of renal disease, this metabolite will accumulate to toxic levels. By inhibiting xanthine oxidase, it reduces uric acid production. High serum uric acid levels may result in gout, kidney stones, and other medical conditions.
