= Adenine phosphoribosyltransferase =

Mammalian protein found in humans

APRT
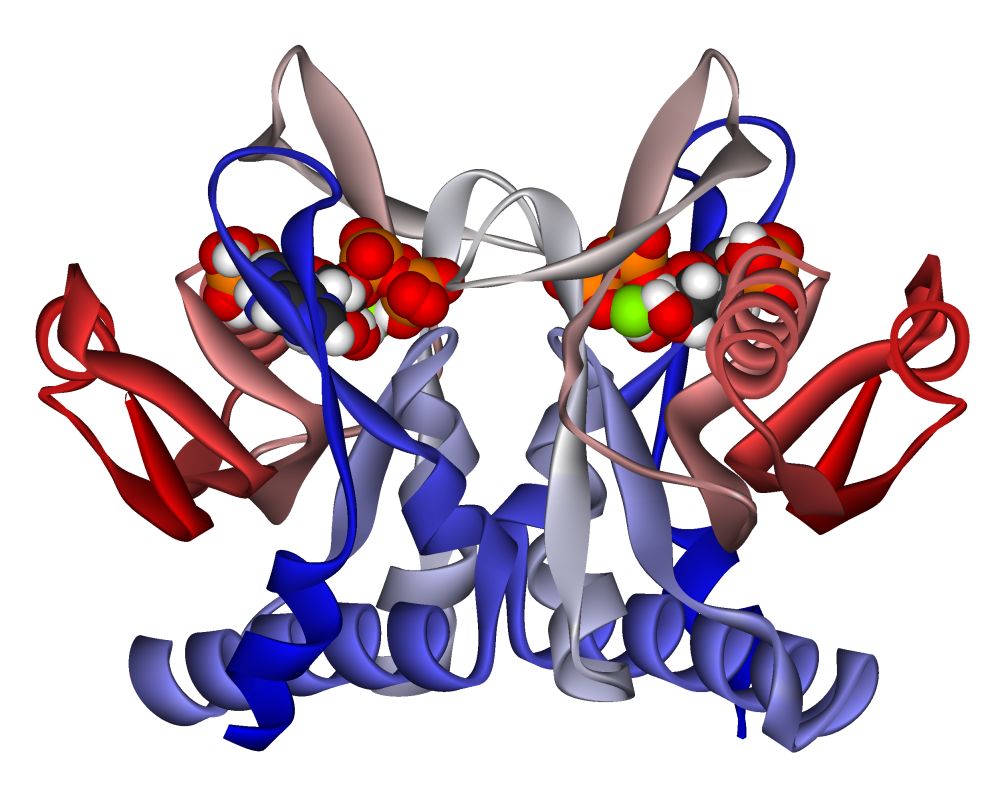
Available structures
PDB	Ortholog search: PDBe RCSB
PDB	List of PDB id codes 1ZN9, 1ORE, 1ZN7, 1ZN8, 4X44, 4X45

Identifiers
- Aliases: APRT, AMP, APRTD, adenine phosphoribosyltransferase
- External IDs: OMIM: 102600; MGI: 88061; HomoloGene: 413; GeneCards: APRT; OMA:APRT - orthologs

Gene location (Human)
Chr.	Chromosome 16 (human)
Band	16q24.3	Start	88,809,339 bp
Band	16q24.3	End	88,811,937 bp

Gene location (Mouse)
Chr.	Chromosome 8 (mouse)
Band	8 E1|8 71.91 cM	Start	123,301,374 bp
Band	8 E1|8 71.91 cM	End	123,303,648 bp
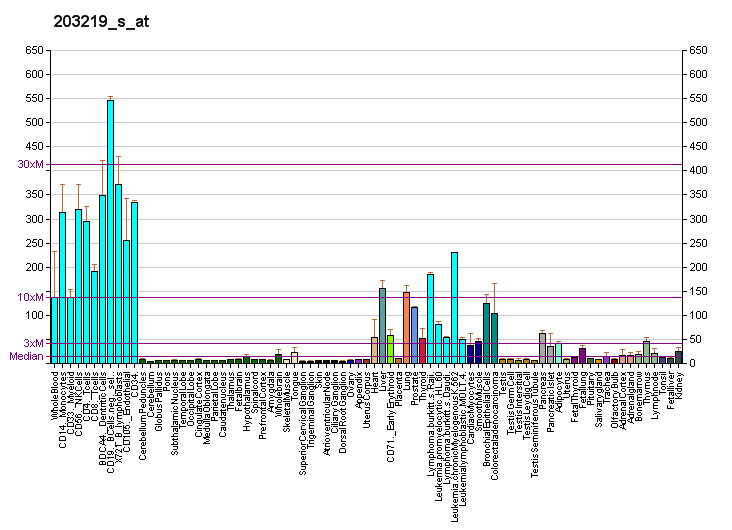

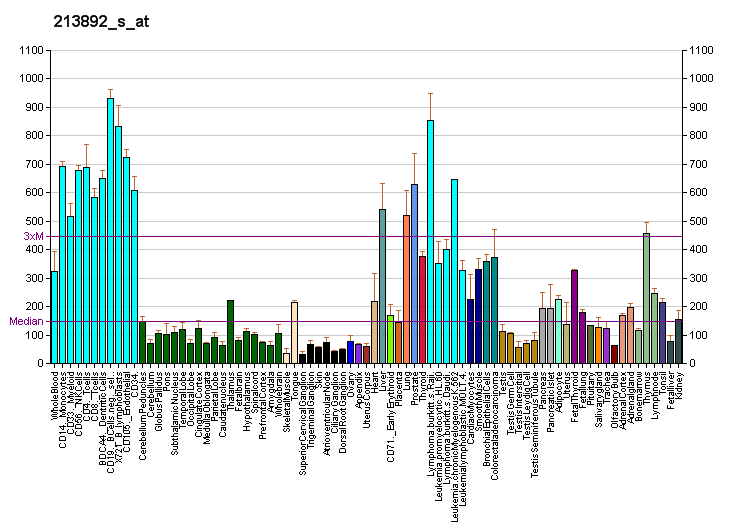
RNA expression pattern
Bgee	Human / Mouse (ortholog); Top expressed in: skin of abdomen; skin of leg; granulocyte; mucosa of transverse colon; body of pancreas; right adrenal gland; right adrenal cortex; left adrenal cortex; body of stomach; minor salivary glands / Top expressed in: endothelial cell of lymphatic vessel; spermatocyte; morula; spermatid; yolk sac; placenta; decidua; embryo; migratory enteric neural crest cell; gastrula; More reference expression data
BioGPS	More reference expression data
Gene ontology
Molecular function	glycosyltransferase activity; transferase activity; adenine binding; adenine phosphoribosyltransferase activity; AMP binding
Cellular component	nucleoplasm; extracellular exosome; extracellular region; cytoplasm; cytosol; secretory granule lumen
Biological process	grooming behavior; nucleoside metabolic process; purine-containing compound salvage; lactation; purine ribonucleoside salvage; adenine salvage; adenine metabolic process; cellular response to insulin stimulus; AMP salvage; neutrophil degranulation
Sources:Amigo / QuickGO
Orthologs
Species	Human	Mouse
Entrez	353	11821
Ensembl	ENSG00000198931	ENSMUSG00000006589
UniProt	P07741	P08030
RefSeq (mRNA)	NM_001030018; NM_000485	NM_009698
RefSeq (protein)	NP_000476; NP_001025189	NP_033828
Location (UCSC)	Chr 16: 88.81 – 88.81 Mb	Chr 8: 123.3 – 123.3 Mb
PubMed search
- Wikidata
View/Edit Human	View/Edit Mouse

Adenine phosphoribosyltransferase (APRTase) is an enzyme encoded by the APRT gene, found in humans on chromosome 16. It is part of the Type I PRTase family and is involved in the nucleotide salvage pathway, which provides an alternative to nucleotide biosynthesis de novo in humans and most other animals. In parasitic protozoa such as giardia, APRTase provides the sole mechanism by which AMP can be produced. APRTase deficiency contributes to the formation of kidney stones (urolithiasis) and to potential kidney failure.

The APRT gene is constituted by 5 exons (in blue). The start (ATG) and stop (TGA) codons are indicated (bold blue). CpG dinucleotides are emphasized in red. They are more abundant in the upstream region of the gene where they form a CpG island.

== Function ==
APRTase catalyzes the following reaction in the purine nucleotide salvage pathway:

Adenine + Phosphoribosyl Pyrophosphate (PRPP) → Adenylate (AMP) + Pyrophosphate (PPi)

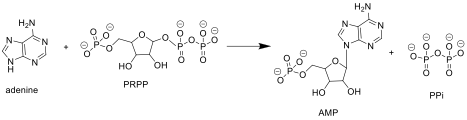
ARPTase catalyzes a phosphoribosyl transfer from PRPP to adenine, forming AMP and releasing pyrophosphate (PPi).

In organisms that can synthesize purines de novo, the nucleotide salvage pathway provides an alternative that is energetically more efficient. It can salvage adenine from the polyamine biosynthetic pathway or from dietary sources of purines. Although APRTase is functionally redundant in these organisms, it becomes more important during periods of rapid growth, such as embryogenesis and tumor growth. It is constitutively expressed in all mammalian tissue.

In protozoan parasites, the nucleotide salvage pathway provides the sole means for nucleotide synthesis. Since the consequences of APRTase deficiency in humans is comparatively mild and treatable, it may be possible to treat certain parasitic infections by targeting APRTase function.

In plants, as in other organisms, ARPTase functions primarily for the synthesis of adenylate. It has the unique ability to metabolize cytokinins—a plant hormone that can exist as a base, nucleotide, or nucleoside—into adenylate nucleotides.

APRT is functionally related to hypoxanthine-guanine phosphoribosyltransferase (HPRT).

== Structure ==
APRTase is a homodimer, with 179 amino acid residues per monomer. Each monomer contains the following regions:

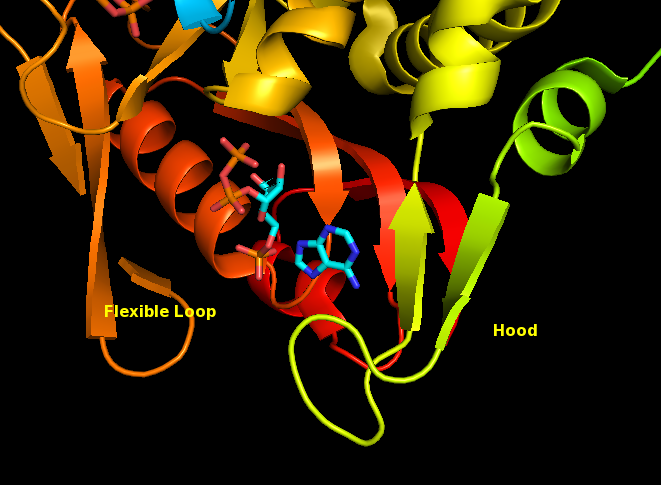
Catalytic site of APRTase with reactants adenine and PRPP resolved. The Hood is believed to be important for purine specificity, while the flexible loop is thought to contain the molecules within the active site.

- "Core" domain (residues 33-169) with five parallel β-sheets
- "Hood" domain (residues 5-34) with 2 α-helices and 2 β-sheets
- "Flexible loop" domain (residues 95-113) with 2 antiparallel β-sheets

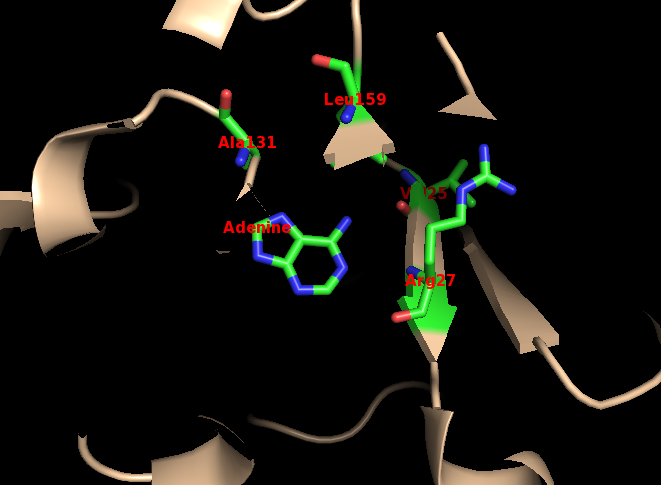
Residues A131, L159, V25, and R27 are important for purine specificity in human APRTase.

The core is highly conserved across many PRTases. The hood, which contains the adenine binding site, has more variability within the family of enzymes. A 13-residue motif comprises the PRPP binding region and involves two adjacent acidic residues and at least one surrounding hydrophobic residue.

The enzyme's specificity for adenine involves hydrophobic residues Ala131 and Leu159 in the core domain. In humans, two residues in the hood domain hydrogen bond with the purine for further specificity: Val25 with the hydrogens on N6, and Arg27 with N1. Although the flexible loop does not interact with the hood during purine recognition, it is thought to close over the active site and sequester the reaction from solvents.

Most research on APRTase reports that Mg^{2+} is essential for phosphoribosyl transfer, and this is conserved across Type I PRTases. However, a recent effort to resolve the structure of human APRTase was unable to locate a single site for Mg^{2+}, but did find evidence to suggest a Cl^{−} atom near Trp98. Despite the difficulty of placing Mg^{2+}, it is generally accepted that the catalytic mechanism is dependent on this ion.

== Mechanism ==
APRTase proceeds via a bi bi ordered sequential mechanism, involving the formation of a ternary complex. The enzyme first binds PRPP, followed by adenine. After the phosphoribosyl transfer occurs, pyrophosphate leaves first, followed by AMP. Kinetic studies indicate that the phosphoribosyl transfer is relatively fast, while the product release (particularly the release of AMP) is rate-limiting.

In human APRTase, it is thought that adenine's N9 proton is abstracted by Glu104 to form an oxacarbenium transition state. This functions as the nucleophile to attack the anomeric carbon of PRPP, forming AMP and displacing pyrophosphate from PRPP. The mechanism of APRTase is generally consistent with that of other PRTases, which conserve the function of displacing PRPP's α-1-pyrophosphate using a nitrogen nucleophile, in either an S_{N}1 or S_{N}2 attack.

== Deficiency ==
When APRTase has reduced or nonexistent activity, adenine accumulates from other pathways. It is degraded by xanthine dehydrogenase to 2,8-dihydroxyadenine (DHA). Although DHA is protein-bound in plasma, it has poor solubility in urine and gradually precipitates in kidney tubules, leading to the formation of kidney stones (urolithiasis). If left untreated, the condition can eventually produce kidney failure.

ARPTase deficiency was first diagnosed in the UK in 1976. Since then, two categories of APRTase deficiency have been defined in humans.

Type I deficiency results in a complete loss of APRTase activity and can occur in patients that are homozygous or compound heterozygous for various mutations. Sequencing has revealed many different mutations that can account for Type 1, including missense mutations, nonsense mutations, a duplicated set of 4 base pairs in exon 3, and a single thymine insertion in intron 4. These mutations cause effects that are clustered into three main areas: in the binding of PRPP's β-phosphate, in the binding of PRPP's 5'-phosphate, and in the segment of the flexible loop that closes over the active site during catalysis Type I deficiency has been observed in various ethnic groups but studied predominately among White populations.

Type II deficiency causes APRTase to have a reduced affinity for PRPP, resulting in a tenfold increase in the K_{M} value. It has been observed and studied primarily in Japan.

A diagnosis of APRTase deficiency can be made by analyzing kidney stones, measuring DHA concentrations in urine, or analyzing APRTase activity in erythrocytes. It is treatable with regular doses of allopurinol or febuxostat, which inhibit xanthine dehydrogenase activity to prevent the accumulation and precipitation of DHA. The condition can also be attenuated with a low-purine diet and high fluid intake.
