= Aldehyde oxidase 1 =

Protein found in humans

AOX1

Identifiers
- Aliases: AOX1, AO, AOH1, aldehyde oxidase 1
- External IDs: OMIM: 602841; MGI: 88035; GeneCards: AOX1
Available structures
PDB	Ortholog search: PDBe RCSB
PDB	List of PDB id codes 4UHW, 4UHX, 5EPG
Enzyme activity
EC #	BRENDA	ExPASy	KEGG	MetaCyc
1.2.3.1	↗	↗	↗	↗

Gene location (Human)
Chr.	Chromosome 2 (human)
Band	2q33.1	Start	200,586,014 bp
Band	2q33.1	End	200,677,064 bp

Gene location (Mouse)
Chr.	Chromosome 1 (mouse)
Band	1 C1.3|1 28.86 cM	Start	58,069,090 bp
Band	1 C1.3|1 28.86 cM	End	58,145,572 bp
RNA expression pattern
Bgee	Human / Mouse (ortholog); Top expressed in: right adrenal cortex; left adrenal cortex; right lobe of liver; body of pancreas; left uterine tube; germinal epithelium; subcutaneous adipose tissue; right ovary; kidney tubule; gastric mucosa / Top expressed in: left lobe of liver; tunica adventitia of aorta; lumbar spinal ganglion; brown adipose tissue; soleus muscle; tunica media of zone of aorta; white adipose tissue; facial motor nucleus; esophagus; intercostal muscle; More reference expression data
BioGPS	n/a
Gene ontology
Molecular function	oxidoreductase activity, acting on CH-OH group of donors; iron-sulfur cluster binding; NAD binding; metal ion binding; catalytic activity; electron transfer activity; oxidoreductase activity; oxidoreductase activity, acting on the aldehyde or oxo group of donors; aldehyde oxidase activity; iron ion binding; protein homodimerization activity; molybdopterin cofactor binding; flavin adenine dinucleotide binding; 2 iron, 2 sulfur cluster binding; identical protein binding; xanthine dehydrogenase activity; FAD binding
Cellular component	extracellular exosome; cytoplasm; cytosol; nuclear body
Biological process	xanthine catabolic process; vitamin B6 metabolic process; electron transport chain
Sources:Amigo / QuickGO
Orthologs
Databases	NCBI: entry; OMA: entry
Species	Human	Mouse
Entrez	316	11761
Ensembl	ENSG00000138356	ENSMUSG00000063558
UniProt	Q06278	O54754
RefSeq (mRNA)	NM_001159	NM_009676
RefSeq (protein)	NP_001150	NP_033806
Location (UCSC)	Chr 2: 200.59 – 200.68 Mb	Chr 1: 58.07 – 58.15 Mb
PubMed search
- Wikidata
View/Edit Human	View/Edit Mouse

Aldehyde oxidase 1 is an enzyme that in humans is encoded by the AOX1 gene.

Aldehyde oxidase produces hydrogen peroxide and, under certain conditions, can catalyze the formation of superoxide.

== Clinical significance ==
Aldehyde oxidase is a candidate gene for amyotrophic lateral sclerosis.

== See also ==
- MOCOS
