= Crystalluria =

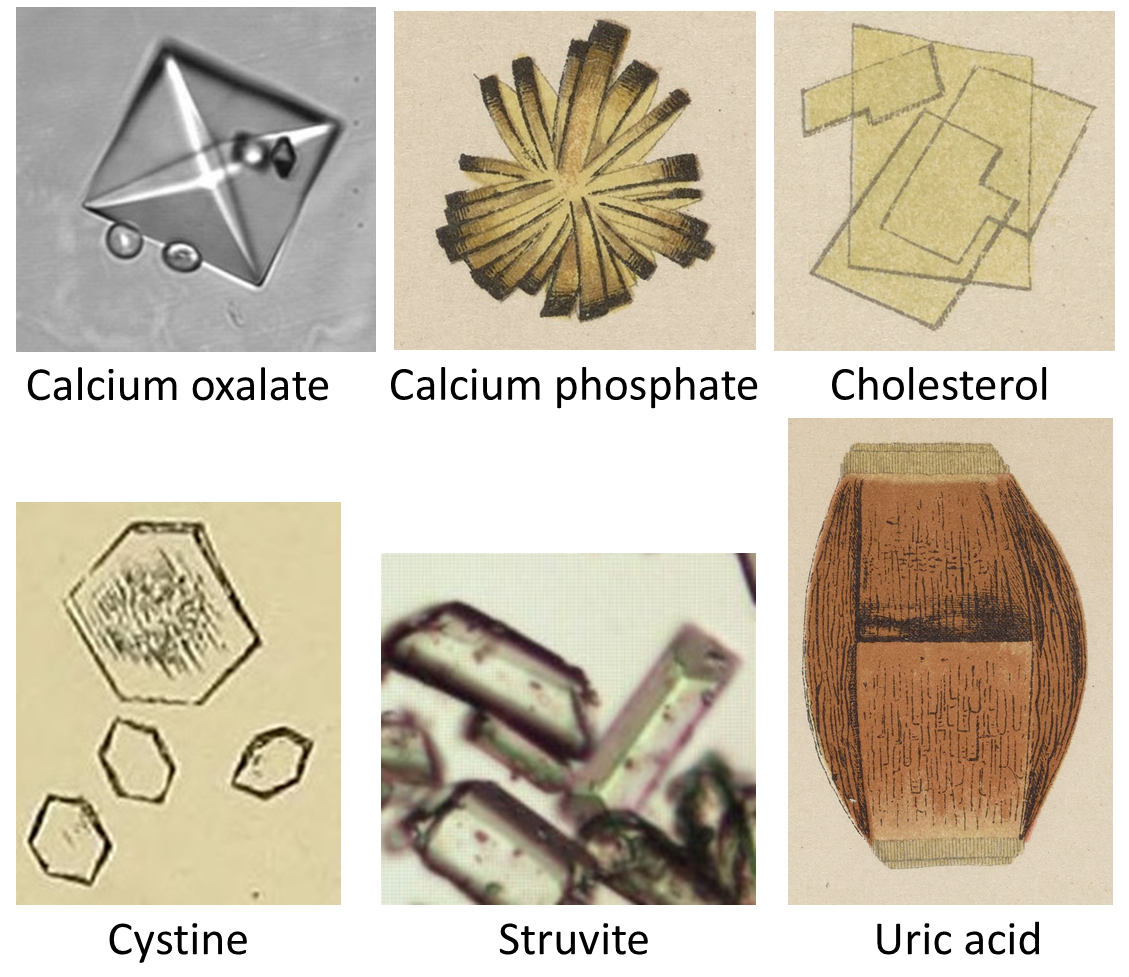
- Comparison of different types of urine crystals

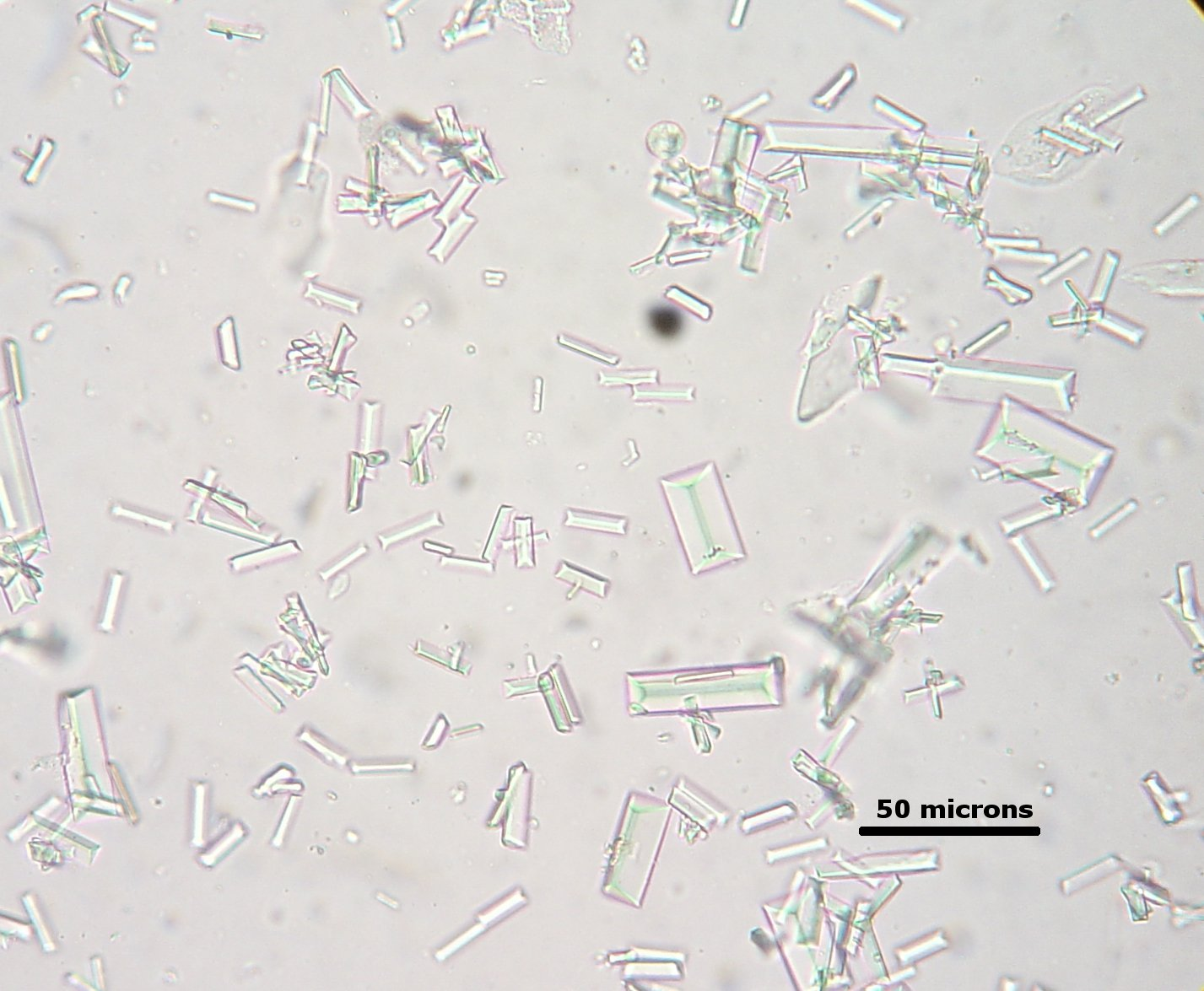
Struvite crystals found in a urinalysis

Crystalluria refers to crystals found in the urine when performing a urine test. Crystalluria is considered often as a benign condition and as one of the side effects of sulfonamides and penicillins.

The main reason for the identification of urinary crystals is to detect the presence of the relatively few abnormal types that may represent a disease.

== Clinical significance ==
It can be an indication of urolithiasis.

It may be relevant when there is presence of specific abnormal types of crystals (cystine, cholesterol, leucine, tyrosine, etc.) and that may be a sign of metabolic or liver disorders such as cystinuria.

Microcrystallization is irritating to the uroepithelium and can lead to symptoms including dysuria, frequency, urgency, and urinary incontinence, as well as hematuria, just like in urinary tract infection.
