= Journal of Inherited Metabolic Disease =

- Discipline: Metabolism
- Language: English
- Edited by: Shamima Rahman and Matthias Baumgartner

Publication details
- History: 1978-present
- Publisher: Wiley Blackwell
- Frequency: Bimonthly
- Impact factor: 4.982 (2020)

Standard abbreviations
- ISO 4: J. Inherit. Metab. Dis.

Indexing
- CODEN: JIMDDP
- ISSN: 0141-8955 (print); 1573-2665 (web)
- OCLC no.: 5845444

Links
- Journal homepage; Online access

The Journal of Inherited Metabolic Disease is a bimonthly peer-reviewed medical journal covering inherited metabolic disorders. It was established in 1978 and is the official journal of the Society for the Study of Inborn Errors of Metabolism.
