= Xanthine dehydrogenase =

Protein-coding gene in the species Homo sapiens

XDH
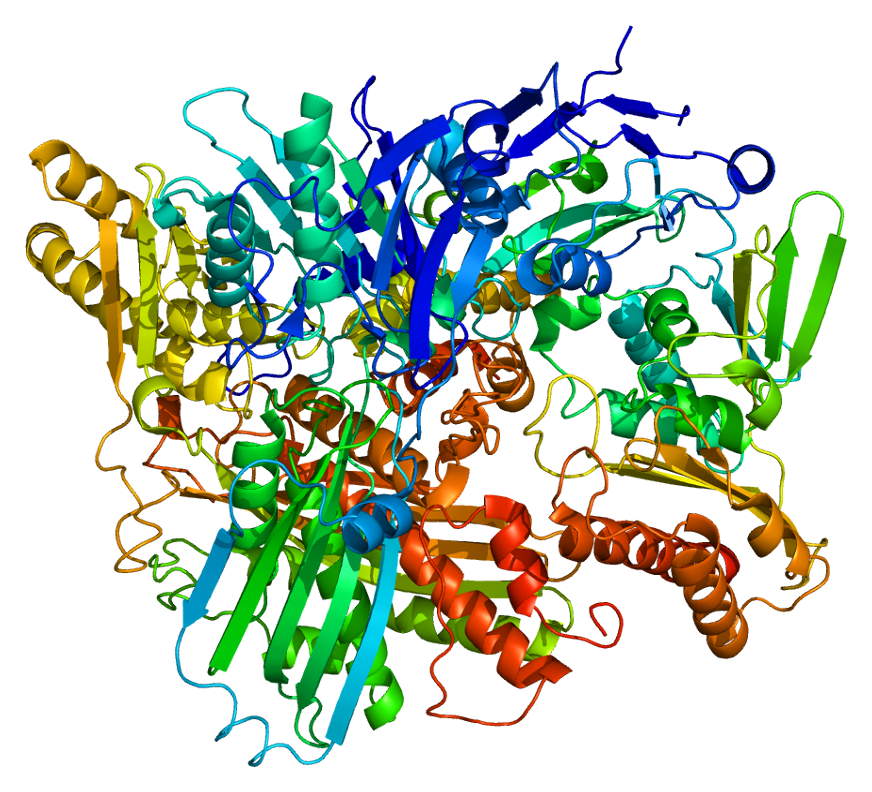

Identifiers
- Aliases: XDH, XO, XOR, xanthine dehydrogenase, XAN1
- External IDs: OMIM: 607633; MGI: 98973; GeneCards: XDH
Available structures
PDB	Ortholog search: PDBe RCSB
PDB	List of PDB id codes 2CKJ, 2E1Q
Enzyme activity
EC #	BRENDA	ExPASy	KEGG	MetaCyc
1.17.1.4	↗	↗	↗	↗
1.17.3.2	↗	↗	↗	↗

Gene location (Human)
Chr.	Chromosome 2 (human)
Band	2p23.1	Start	31,334,321 bp
Band	2p23.1	End	31,414,742 bp

Gene location (Mouse)
Chr.	Chromosome 17 (mouse)
Band	17 E2|17 45.25 cM	Start	74,190,890 bp
Band	17 E2|17 45.25 cM	End	74,257,191 bp
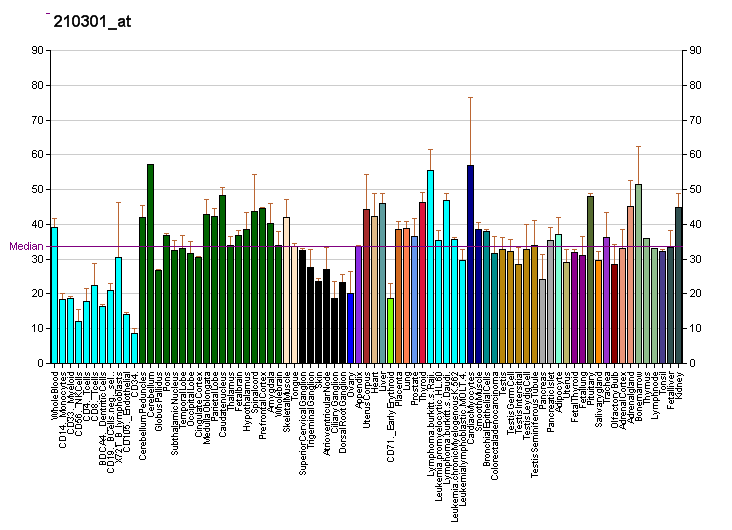
RNA expression pattern
Bgee	Human / Mouse (ortholog); Top expressed in: jejunal mucosa; mucosa of ileum; palpebral conjunctiva; mucosa of colon; mucosa of sigmoid colon; duodenum; liver; right lobe of liver; nasal epithelium; tail of epididymis / Top expressed in: granulocyte; duodenum; stroma of bone marrow; jejunum; decidua; ankle joint; white adipose tissue; gastrula; esophagus; left lobe of liver; More reference expression data
BioGPS	More reference expression data
Gene ontology
Molecular function	iron ion binding; protein homodimerization activity; xanthine oxidase activity; flavin adenine dinucleotide binding; oxidoreductase activity, acting on CH-OH group of donors; iron-sulfur cluster binding; metal ion binding; catalytic activity; molybdopterin cofactor binding; electron transfer activity; xanthine dehydrogenase activity; oxidoreductase activity; 2 iron, 2 sulfur cluster binding; oxidoreductase activity, acting on the aldehyde or oxo group of donors; FAD binding
Cellular component	cytoplasm; cytosol; peroxisome; sarcoplasmic reticulum; extracellular region; extracellular space
Biological process	positive regulation of p38MAPK cascade; negative regulation of protein phosphorylation; negative regulation of protein kinase B signaling; purine nucleotide catabolic process; negative regulation of endothelial cell differentiation; negative regulation of gene expression; negative regulation of endothelial cell proliferation; positive regulation of reactive oxygen species metabolic process; negative regulation of vasculogenesis; negative regulation of vascular endothelial growth factor signaling pathway; lactation; regulation of epithelial cell differentiation; xanthine catabolic process; activation of cysteine-type endopeptidase activity involved in apoptotic process; electron transport chain
Sources:Amigo / QuickGO
Orthologs
Databases	NCBI: entry; OMA: entry
Species	Human	Mouse
Entrez	7498	22436
Ensembl	ENSG00000158125	ENSMUSG00000024066
UniProt	P47989	Q00519
RefSeq (mRNA)	NM_000379	NM_011723
RefSeq (protein)	NP_000370	NP_035853
Location (UCSC)	Chr 2: 31.33 – 31.41 Mb	Chr 17: 74.19 – 74.26 Mb
PubMed search
- Wikidata
View/Edit Human	View/Edit Mouse

xanthine dehydrogenase
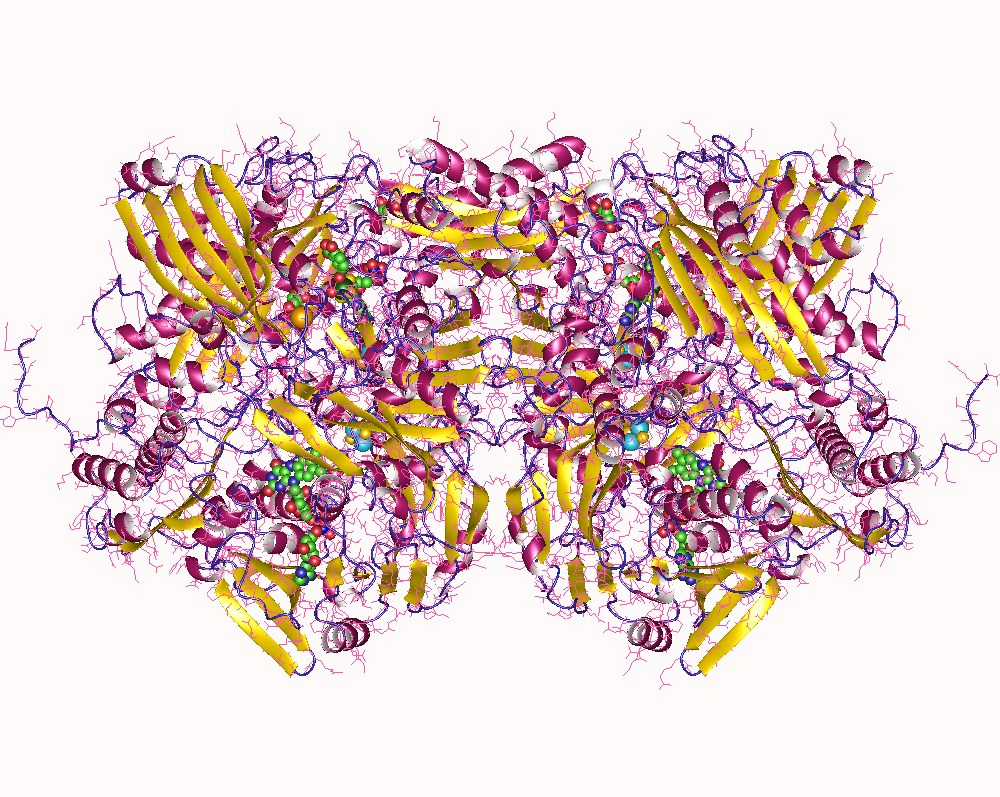
- Bos taurus

Identifiers
- EC no.: 1.17.1.4
- CAS no.: 9054-84-6

Databases
- BRENDA: enzyme data
- ExPASy: NiceZyme view
- KEGG: enzyme entry
- MetaCyc: metabolic pathway
- Rhea: reactions
- PDB structures: RCSB PDB PDBe PDBsum
- Gene Ontology: AmiGO / QuickGO
Search
- PMC: articles
- PubMed: articles
- NCBI: proteins

Xanthine dehydrogenase, also known as XDH, is a protein that, in humans, is encoded by the XDH gene.

== Function ==
Xanthine dehydrogenase belongs to the group of molybdenum-containing hydroxylases involved in the oxidative metabolism of purines. The enzyme is a homodimer. Xanthine dehydrogenase can be converted to xanthine oxidase by reversible sulfhydryl oxidation or by irreversible proteolytic modification.

Xanthine dehydrogenase catalyzes the following chemical reaction:

xanthine + NAD^{+} + H_{2}O $\rightleftharpoons$ urate + NADH + H^{+}

The three substrates of this enzyme are xanthine, NAD^{+}, and H_{2}O, whereas its three products are urate, NADH, and H^{+}.

This enzyme participates in purine metabolism.

== Nomenclature ==
This enzyme belongs to the family of oxidoreductases, to be specific, those acting on CH or CH_{2} groups with NAD^{+} or NADP^{+} as acceptor. The systematic name of this enzyme class is xanthine:NAD^{+} oxidoreductase. Other names in common use include NAD^{+}-xanthine dehydrogenase, xanthine-NAD^{+} oxidoreductase, xanthine/NAD^{+} oxidoreductase, and xanthine oxidoreductase.

== Clinical significance ==
Defects in xanthine dehydrogenase cause xanthinuria, may contribute to adult respiratory stress syndrome, and may potentiate influenza infection through an oxygen metabolite-dependent mechanism. It has been shown that patients with lung adenocarcinoma tumors which have high levels of XDH gene expression have lower survivals. Addiction to XDH protein has been used to target NSCLC tumors and cell lines in a precision oncology manner.

== See also ==
- Aldehyde oxidase and xanthine dehydrogenase, a/b hammerhead domain
- MOCOS
- Xanthine oxidase
