= William Nyhan =

American physician (1926–2026)

- Born: March 13, 1926; Boston, Massachusetts, U.S.
- Died: February 11, 2026 (aged 99)
- Known for: Lesch-Nyhan syndrome
- Scientific career
- Fields: Medicine
- Institutions: UC San Diego School of Medicine, Johns Hopkins School of Medicine, University of Miami

William Leo Nyhan (March 13, 1926 – February 11, 2026) was an American physician best known as the co-discoverer of Lesch–Nyhan syndrome.

Nyhan later served as professor of pediatrics at University of California, San Diego School of Medicine in La Jolla, California. He held positions at Johns Hopkins School of Medicine and the Miller School of Medicine at the University of Miami, and served on a number of advisory committees, pediatric advisory boards, and research foundation boards.

His areas of research spanned a variety of amino acid metabolism disorders, among them 4-hydroxybutyric aciduria, 3-methylglutaconyl-Co A hydratase deficiency, multiple carboxylase deficiency, methylmalonic acidemia, and propionic acidemia. He studied the neuropathology of propionic acidemia, including the manifestation of basal ganglia infarction and its neurologic, non-metabolic presentation. He later conducted research into the causes of progressive neurologic disability caused by methylmalonic acidemia following liver transplantation.

He was involved in the ongoing development of tandem mass spectrometry for use in newborn screening and research. In addition, he was investigating the use of dichloroacetate to treat a broad range of mitochondrial diseases that lead to lactic acidemia.

Nyhan died on February 11, 2026, at the age of 99.

== See also ==
- Sakati–Nyhan–Tisdale syndrome
- Lesch–Nyhan syndrome
