= Xanthine oxidase =

Class of enzymes

xanthine oxidase/dehydrogenase
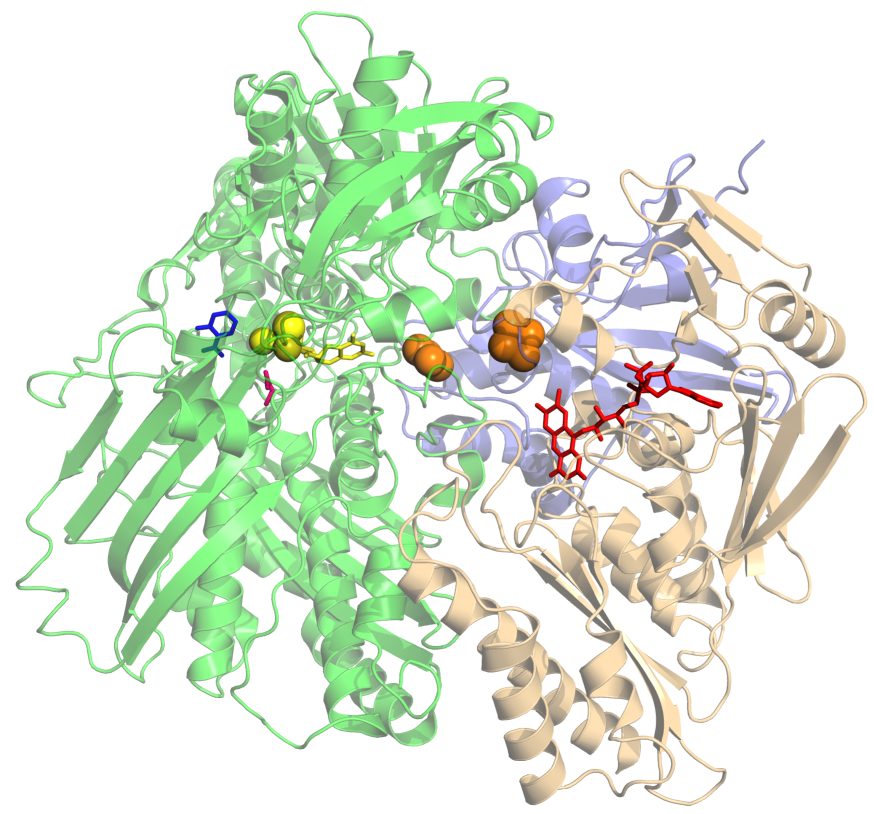
- Crystallographic structure (monomer) of bovine xanthine oxidase. The bounded FAD (red), FeS-cluster (orange), the molybdopterin cofactor with molybdenum (yellow) and salicylate (blue) are indicated.

Identifiers
- EC no.: 1.17.3.2
- CAS no.: 9002-17-9

Databases
- BRENDA: enzyme data
- ExPASy: NiceZyme view
- KEGG: enzyme entry
- MetaCyc: metabolic pathway
- Rhea: reactions
- PDB structures: RCSB PDB PDBe PDBsum
- Gene Ontology: AmiGO / QuickGO
Search
- PMC: articles
- PubMed: articles
- NCBI: proteins

xanthine oxidase/dehydrogenase

Identifiers
- Symbol: XDH
- NCBI gene: 7498
- HGNC: 12805
- OMIM: 607633
- PDB: 1FIQ
- RefSeq: NM_000379
- UniProt: P47989

Other data
- EC number: 1.17.3.2
- Locus: Chr. 2 p23.1
Search for
- Structures: Swiss-model
- Domains: InterPro

Xanthine oxidase (XO or XAO) is a form of xanthine oxidoreductase, a type of enzyme that generates reactive oxygen species. These enzymes catalyze the oxidation of hypoxanthine to xanthine and can further catalyze the oxidation of xanthine to uric acid. These enzymes play an important role in the catabolism of purines in some species, including humans.

Xanthine oxidase is defined as an enzyme activity (EC 1.17.3.2). The same protein, which in humans has the HGNC approved gene symbol XDH, can also have xanthine dehydrogenase activity (EC 1.17.1.4). Most of the protein in the liver exists in a form with xanthine dehydrogenase activity, but it can be converted to xanthine oxidase by reversible sulfhydryl oxidation or by irreversible proteolytic modification.

== Reaction ==
The following chemical reactions are catalyzed by xanthine oxidase:

- hypoxanthine + H_{2}O + O_{2} ⇌ xanthine + H_{2}O_{2}
- xanthine + H_{2}O + O_{2} ⇌ uric acid + H_{2}O_{2}
- Xanthine oxidase can also act on certain other purines, pterins, and aldehydes. For example, it efficiently converts 1-methylxanthine (a metabolite of caffeine) to 1-methyluric acid, but has little activity on 3-methylxanthine.
- Under some circumstances it can produce superoxide ions: RH + H_{2}O + 2 O_{2} ⇌ ROH + 2 O^{−}_{2} + 2 H^{+}.
hypoxanthine (one oxygen atom)

xanthine (two oxygens)

uric acid (three oxygens)

=== Other reactions ===
Because XO is a superoxide-producing enzyme, with general low specificity, it can be combined with other compounds and enzymes and create reactive oxidants, as well as oxidize other substrates.

Bovine xanthine oxidase (from milk) was originally thought to have a binding site to reduce cytochrome c with, but it has been found that the mechanism to reduce this protein is through XO's superoxide anion byproduct, with competitive inhibition by carbonic anhydrase.

Another reaction catalyzed by xanthine oxidase is the decomposition of S-nitrosothiols (RSNO), a class of reactive nitrogen species, to nitric oxide (NO), which reacts with a superoxide anion to form peroxynitrite under aerobic conditions.

XO has also been found to produce the strong one-electron oxidant carbonate radical anion from oxidation with acetaldehyde in the presence of catalase and bicarbonate. It was suggested that the carbonate radical was likely produced in one of the enzyme's redox centers with a peroxymonocarbonate intermediate.

Here is a diagram highlighting the pathways catalyzed by xanthine oxidase.

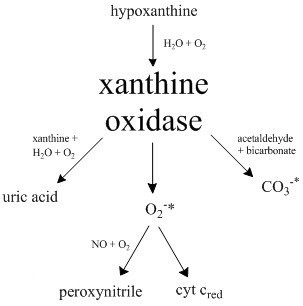

It is suggested that xanthine oxidoreductase, along with other enzymes, participates in the conversion of nitrate to nitrite in mammalian tissues.

== Protein structure ==
The protein is a homodimer and each subunit has a molecular weight of roughly 145 kDa. Each active site consists of a flavin molecule (bound as FAD), a Moco cofactor containing a molybdenum atom, and 2 [2Fe-2S] clusters containing 4 iron atoms. The Moco cofactors are the active sites of the enzyme, where oxidation occurs. The [2Fe-2S] clusters participate in the electron transfer reaction and the FAD facilitates the reduction of the electron acceptor.

== Catalytic mechanism ==
The active site of XO is composed of a molybdopterin unit with the molybdenum atom also coordinated by terminal oxygen (oxo), sulfur atoms and a terminal hydroxide. In the reaction with xanthine to form uric acid, the S=Mo^{VI}O-H group ionizes and the resulting MoVI-O^{−} attacks carbon concomitant with transfer of H^{−} to Mo=S. The resulting HS-Mo^{IV}-O-C center then undergoes 2e oxidation with hydrolysis of the MoVI-O-C group, giving back S=Mo^{VI}-OH, together with xanthine. Like other known molybdenum-containing oxidoreductases, the oxygen atom introduced to the substrate by XO originates from water rather than from dioxygen (O_{2}).

== Clinical significance ==
Xanthine oxidase is a superoxide-producing enzyme found normally in serum and the lungs, and its activity is increased during influenza A infection.

During severe liver damage, xanthine oxidase is released into the blood, so a blood assay for XO is a way to determine if liver damage has happened.

Because xanthine oxidase is a metabolic pathway for uric acid formation, the xanthine oxidase inhibitor allopurinol is used in the treatment of gout. Since xanthine oxidase is involved in the metabolism of 6-mercaptopurine, caution should be taken before administering allopurinol and 6-mercaptopurine, or its prodrug azathioprine, in conjunction.

Xanthinuria is a rare genetic disorder where the lack of xanthine oxidase leads to high concentration of xanthine in blood and can cause health problems such as renal failure. There is no specific treatment, affected people are advised by doctors to avoid foods high in purine and to maintain a high fluid intake. Type I xanthinuria has been traced directly to mutations of the XDH gene which mediates xanthine oxidase activity. Type II xanthinuria may result from a failure of the mechanism which inserts sulfur into the active sites of xanthine oxidase and aldehyde oxidase, a related enzyme with some overlapping activities (such as conversion of allopurinol to oxypurinol).

Inhibition of xanthine oxidase has been proposed as a mechanism for improving cardiovascular health. A study found that patients with chronic obstructive pulmonary disease (COPD) had a decrease in oxidative stress, including glutathione oxidation and lipid peroxidation, when xanthine oxidase was inhibited using allopurinol. Oxidative stress can be caused by hydroxyl free radicals and hydrogen peroxide, both of which are byproducts of XO activity.

Increased concentration of serum uric acid has been under research as an indicator for cardiovascular health factors, and has been used to strongly predict mortality, heart transplant, and more in patients. But it is not clear whether this could be a direct or casual association or link between serum uric acid concentration (and by proxy, xanthine oxidase activity) and cardiovascular health. States of high cell turnover and alcohol ingestion are some of the most prominent cases of high serum uric acid concentrations.

Reactive nitrogen species, such as peroxynitrite that xanthine oxidase can form, have been found to react with DNA, proteins, and cells, causing cellular damage or even toxicity. Reactive nitrogen signaling, coupled with reactive oxygen species, have been found to be a central part of myocardial and vascular function, explaining why xanthine oxidase is being researched for links to cardiovascular health.

Both xanthine oxidase and xanthine oxidoreductase are also present in corneal epithelium and endothelium and may be involved in oxidative eye injury.

== Inhibitors ==
Inhibitors of XO include allopurinol, oxypurinol, and phytic acid. It has also been found to be inhibited by flavonoids, including those found in Bougainvillea spectabilis (Nyctaginaceae) leaves (with an IC_{50} of 7.23 μM), typically used in folk medicine.

== See also ==
- Xanthine dehydrogenase
- Sodium molybdate
