= Xanthinuria =

- Xanthine
- Specialty: Endocrinology

Xanthinuria, also known as xanthine oxidase deficiency, is a rare genetic disorder causing the accumulation of xanthine. It is caused by a deficiency of the enzyme xanthine oxidase.

It was first formally characterized in 1954.

== Presentation ==
Affected people have unusually high concentrations of xanthine in their blood and urine, which can lead to health problems such as renal failure and xanthine kidney stones, one of the rarest types of kidney stones.

== Causes ==
Type I xanthinuria can be caused by a deficiency of xanthine oxidase, which is an enzyme necessary for converting xanthine to uric acid. Type II xanthinuria and molybdenum cofactor deficiency lack one or two other enzyme activities in addition to xanthine oxidase.

== Treatment ==
There is no specific treatment beyond maintaining a high fluid intake and avoiding foods that are high in purine.
