= Gout suppressants =

Drugs to control and prevent gout attacks

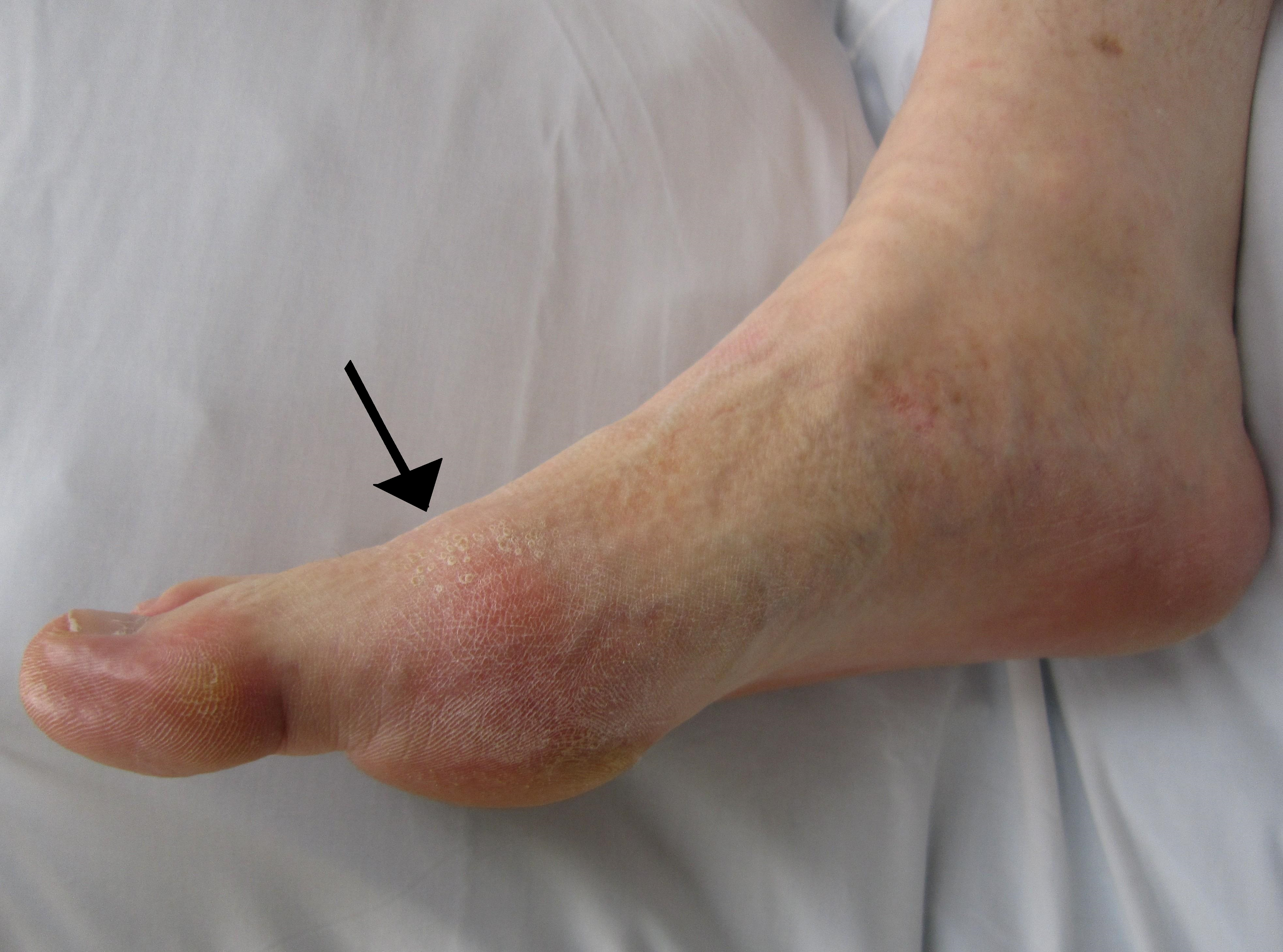
Presentation of gout flare

Gout suppressants are agents which control and prevent gout attacks after the first episode. They can be generally classified into two groups by their purpose: drugs used for induction therapy (a therapy used to induce remission during the acute attack of a disease) and that for maintenance therapy.

Drugs for induction therapy are used during acute gout flare-up to relieve gout symptoms at the acute setting. Standard agents involve nonsteroidal anti-inflammatory drugs (NSAIDs), colchicine and glucocorticoids.

On the other hand, drugs for maintenance therapy are used during remission to prevent future flare-ups in long term. They include uricostatic agents, in particular allopurinol and Febuxostat, and uricosuric agents, such as probenecid and benzbromarone.

== Drugs for induction therapy ==
Induction therapy of gout targets to relieve acute pain and inflammation during the flare-up. NSAIDs, colchicine and systemic glucocorticoids are recommended as first-line agents for the induction therapy in gout.

=== NSAIDs ===
NSAIDs have both anti-inflammatory and analgesic properties, which reduce inflammation and pain during acute gout flares. Common NSAIDs employed in gout treatment include naproxen, indomethacin, ibuprofen, diclofenac, meloxicam and celecoxib, all orally administered. However, aspirin is not indicated for gout as it may induce kidney retention of uric acid, exacerbating gout.

==== Mechanism of action ====
NSAIDs inhibit cyclooxygenase, which synthesise eicosanoids to cause pain and inflammation. With reduced synthesis of eicosanoids, the symptoms of gout flare can be suppressed.

==== Adverse effects ====
Common adverse effects of NSAIDs are mainly gastro-intestinal-related. The most usual side effects, which include dyspepsia, nausea, vomiting, abdominal pain, etc., can appear in up to 40% of NSAID users. Upon chronic use, NSAIDs may also contribute to peptic ulcers, kidney injuries and cardiovascular diseases, in particular hypertension and congestive heart failure. To avoid the common adverse effects, NSAIDs are usually taken with or after food. Risks led by chronic NSAID use could be reduced by limiting their use to only when necessary.

==== Contraindications ====
NSAIDs are contraindicated in older adults suffering from heart failure, kidney dysfunction, or gastrointestinal disease. Indomethacin is especially avoided in the older population as it carries a higher risk of adverse effects when compared with other NSAIDs.

In addition, NSAIDs are discouraged during pregnancy. Their use should be restricted to the first 20 weeks of gestation.

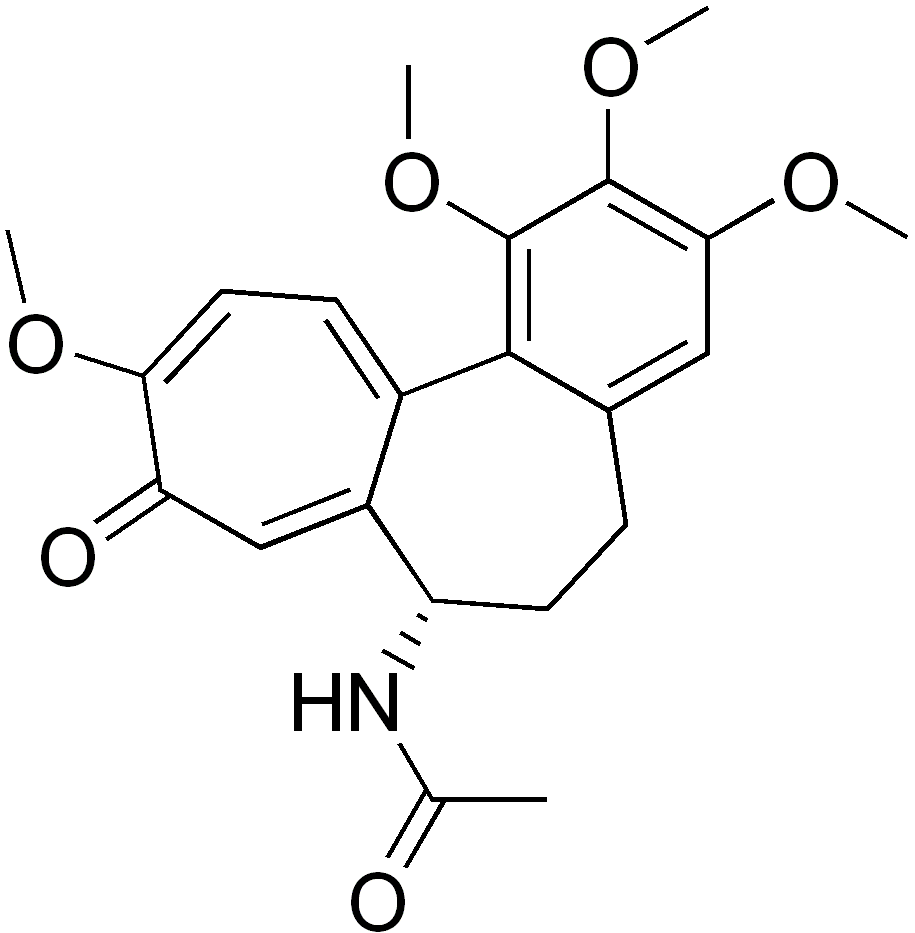
Structure of colchicine

=== Colchicine ===
Colchicine is an FDA-approved antigout agent indicated for the suppression of gout flares. It has a long history of being a gout suppressant with its anti-inflammatory effects.

==== Mechanism of action ====
The precise mechanism of action of colchicine in gout control is still under investigation. Some possible mechanisms propose that it could be due to the increased levels of anti-inflammatory mediators, or the inhibition of neutrophils activation, which finally precipitates to certain gout symptoms. Still, colchicine is proved to have a similar efficacy with NSAIDs in gout treatment.

==== Adverse effects ====
Common adverse drug reactions related to colchicine include diarrhea, vomiting and nausea. Colchicine in high doses may lead to toxicity, with more severe symptoms such as myopathy, sensorimotor neuropathy, and leukopenia. Notwithstanding, these symptoms of toxicity are believed to be reversible upon dose adjustment or discontinuation.

==== Interactions ====
Colchicine interacts with certain drugs and food. For drug interaction, colchicine interacts with P-glycoprotein (P-gp) inhibitors and CYP3A4 inhibitors since it is a substrate of P-gp and primarily metabolized by CYP3A4. The serum concentration of colchicine will increase when colchicine is co-administered with P-gp inhibitors (e.g. cyclosporine and ranolazine) and CYP3A4 inhibitors (e.g. clarithromycin and diltiazem). Hence, the dose of colchicine should be adjusted to avoid serious interactions.

For food interaction, colchicine taken together with grapefruit juice will result in an increased serum concentration of colchicine, suggesting potential toxicity.

==== Contraindications ====
Colchicine is contraindicated in patients with any level of kidney or liver impairment who are taking P-gp inhibitors or medications that significantly decrease the activity of CYP3A4. It should also be avoided in patients with any level of kidney or liver impairment who have just finished treatment of the above medications within 14 days. Colchicine is also avoided during lactation.

=== Glucocorticoids ===
Glucocorticoids are anti-inflammatories with high potency, hence having the ability to suppress inflammation during an acute gout attack. Common glucocorticoids used for gout suppression includes triamcinolone acetonide, methylprednisolone acetate, prednisone and prednisolone.

==== Mechanism of action ====
Glucocorticoids alleviate inflammation by inhibiting the stimulation of the inflammatory cascade triggered by IL-1β, a pro-inflammatory cytokine.

==== Route of administration ====
Unlike NSAIDs and colchicine which are taken orally, the administration of glucocorticoids is available in different routes depending on patient characteristics. The routes of administration include intra-articular, oral and parenteral.

Intra-articular administration of glucocorticoids is usually preferred in patients with only 1-2 affected joints, and when an experienced practitioner is available. Before injection, septic arthritis (joint infection) should be ruled out by synovial fluid culture.

Oral glucocorticoids are preferred in patients suffering from gout attacks in multiple joints simultaneously, and when arthrocentesis is not practical. It is important to taper the dose (a gradual reduction of dose) of glucocorticoids instead of stopping the treatment abruptly to prevent withdrawal symptoms. For patients who have experienced relapsing or refractory disease, the tapering of glucocorticoids may extend to 14 to 20 days.

Parenteral administration of glucocorticoids, in particular intravenous and intramuscular injection, is considered in patients who cannot take oral medications and are ineligible to receive intra-articular glucocorticoids. Tapering is required in intravenous administration after symptoms resolve, but not in intramuscular administration.

==== Adverse effects ====
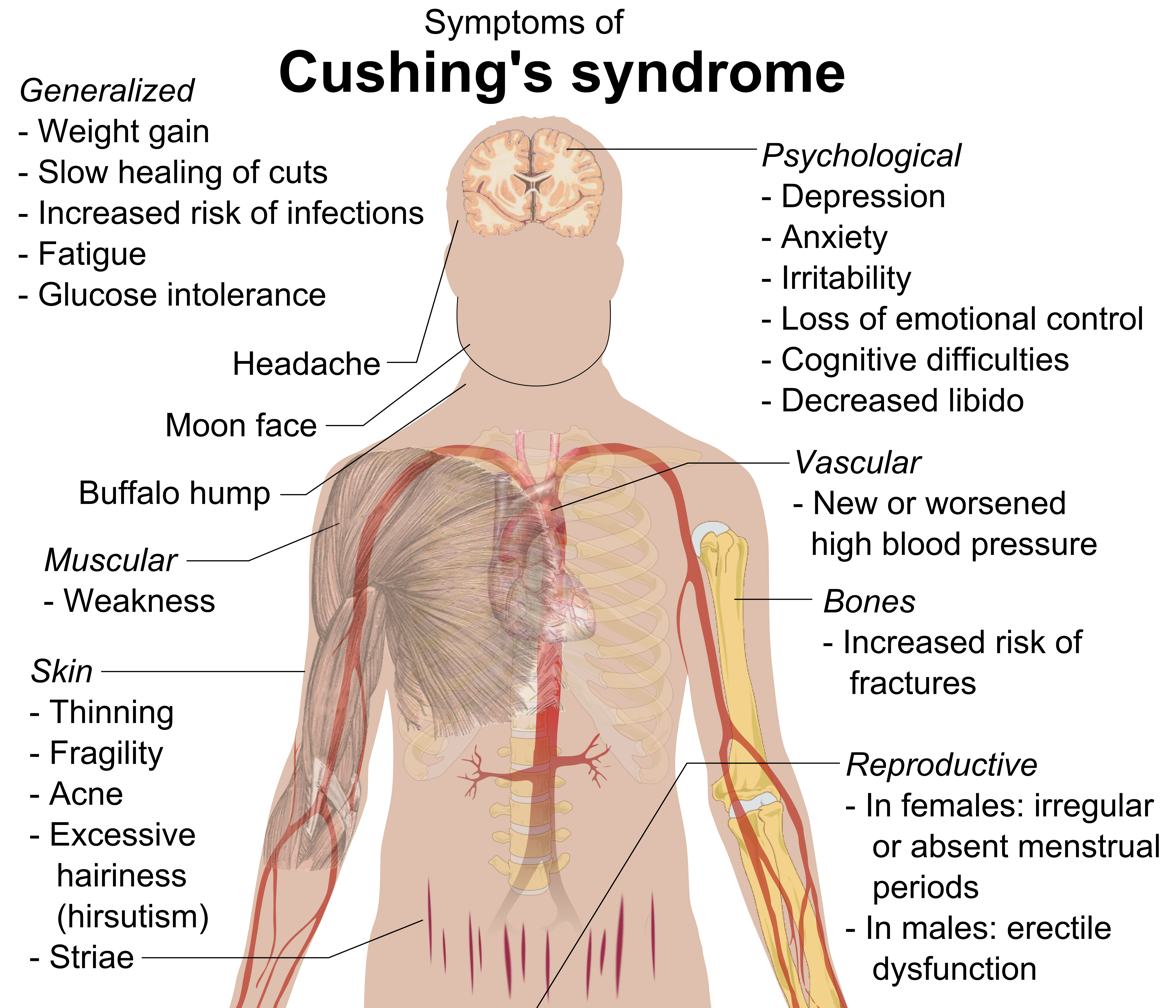
Symptoms of Cushing's syndrome

Systemic glucocorticoids are associated with various adverse effects. Representative side effects include immunosuppression, gastrointestinal adverse effects, weight gain, osteoporosis, etc. On the chronic or frequent short-term treatment of glucocorticoids, Cushing syndrome, glaucoma and diabetes mellitus may also result.

==== Indications and contraindications ====
Glucocorticoids are often used in pregnant and breastfeeding patients due to their discouraged use of colchicine and NSAIDs. On the other hand, systemic glucocorticoids are contraindicated in patients with poorly controlled hypertension or diabetes.

== Drugs for maintenance therapy ==
The maintenance therapy, also known as the urate-lowering therapy (ULT), chiefly focuses on preventing future gout flares by lowering the serum urate level. It mainly includes two types of drugs, which are the uricostatic agents and uricosuric agents. According to the NICE guideline, ULT can induce acute gout attack during the starting treatment period as they could cause fluctuations in blood uric acid level. Thus, ULT is usually being started after gout flare is under control like pain and inflammation are being settled. Patients also need to receive prophylactic treatment with drugs (normally colchicine, unless intolerant, consider low-dose NASIDs or low-dose oral corticosteroids) for 3–6 months to reduce inflammatory response regardless of which type of urate-lowering agents is used.

=== Uricostatic agents ===
Chronic use of uricostatic agents can help to reduce serum urate level. Allopurinol and Febuxostat are common examples of this agent. Both allopurinol and febuxostat need to start with a low dose, then titrate up (increasing the dosage of the medication) until it reaches the target blood urate level, usually titrating every 2–5 weeks.

==== Mechanism of action ====
Uricostatic agents reduce uric acid synthesis by slowing down the breakdown of purines through inhibiting xanthine oxidase (enzyme catalyzing the conversion of hypoxanthine to xanthine and further into urate).

==== Allopurinol ====
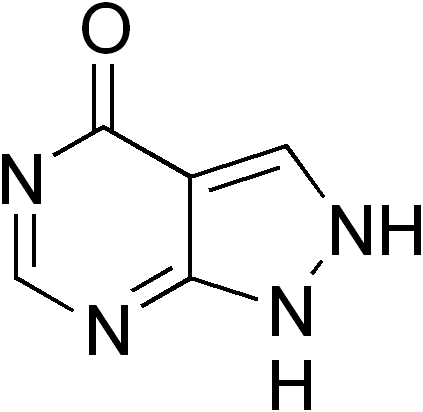
Structure of Allopurinol

Allopurinol is generally preferred first-line treatment over other ULT medications.

===== Adverse effects =====
- Some common adverse effects are transient rash, vomiting, nausea, constipation, flatulence, renal failure and induced hepatic hypersensitivity. To reduce stomach upset, it needs to be taken with meals.
- Allopurinol hypersensitivity syndrome (AHS) is a severe adverse effect of allopurinol, which may cause exfoliative dermatitis, Steven-Johnson syndrome or severe cutaneous adverse reactions, leading to 20-25% mortality rate. Renal impairment patients are at higher risk of having AHS. Therefore, if there are any signs of allergy like red, blistered and swollen skin, please stop the drug immediately and seek professional help as soon as possible.

===== Pre-treatment screening =====
- HLA-B*58:01 allele pharmacogenetics screening is recommended to be done prior to the treatment of allopurinol with high risk groups, especially those with Han Chinese, Korean or Thai origins.

==== Febuxostat ====
Structure of Febuxostat

Febuxostat belongs to the group of non-purine xanthine oxidase inhibitor. It is a more potent and selective inhibitor than allopurinol. However, according to the NICE guideline, if the patient has pre-existing cardiovascular disease (CV disease), febuxostat is used only when the patient is not tolerated or contraindicated to allopurinol. It is because patients having pre-existing CV disease with febuxostat treatment has a higher cardiovascular mortality rate than allopurinol.

===== Adverse effects =====
- Some mild and common side effects include liver function abnormalities, nausea, rash and arthralgias (joint pain). Less than 1% of patients would have severe side effects like hepatotoxicity and anemia.

===== Contraindications =====
- Possible drug-drug interactions can be observed with mercaptopurine and azathioprine. Thus, patients taking these drugs are contraindicated to febuxostat.

=== Uricosuric agents ===
Uricosuric agents are second-line agents and they prevent future gout attack by excreting more uric acid from our body to decrease body urate level. Examples of uricosuric agents are probenecid and benzbromarone.

==== Mechanism of action ====
Uricosuric agents reduce serum uric acid level by increasing urate excretion. It is done by inhibiting the post-secretory tubule (mainly proximal tubule) reabsorbing the filtered urates back to our body.

Structure of probenecid

==== Probenecid ====
===== Adverse effects =====
- Vomiting, nausea, headache, anorexia (decreased appetite) and flushing are the common side effects of probenecid. As this medication may cause GI discomfort, taking it with food is recommended.
- Severe adverse effect like hypersensitivity reactions (e.g. Steven-Johnson syndrome) and hepatic necrosis (death of liver cell) may occur in patients taking probenecid.

===== Cautions and contraindications =====
- Patients who have a medical history of G6PD deficiency should use probenecid in caution as for there may be an increased risk of hemolytic anemia. Peptic ulcer patients also need to use it with caution.
- Patients having blood disorder and history of having kidney stones are contraindicated in using probenecid. Besides, probenecid needs to be avoided in patients having antibacterial therapy with impaired renal function (CrCl < 30 mL/min). Moreover, patients smaller than 2 years old are contraindicated with this drug.

Structure of benzbromarone

==== Benzbromarone ====
===== Adverse effects =====
- Common adverse drug reactions include GI discomfort (nausea, vomiting, diarrhoea). Severe adverse effects related to this drug are urinating pain (may indicate renal calculi), skin rash, chest pain and shortness of breath. As benzbromarone can cause severe hepatotoxicity, regular liver function tests are required for patient taking this medication.

===== Cautions and contraindications =====
- Aspirin and other salicylates may antagonize the effect of benzbromarone. Hence, precautions need to be taken when using these two drugs together.
- Benzbromarone should be avoided in patients with urinary urate over-excretion (greater than 700 mg urate in 24 hours urine measurement). Also, renal function of the patient needs to be adequate (CrCl needs to be greater than 30 mL/min). As these agents would increase the risk of having kidney stones, counseling patients on drinking enough water (~2-3 L/day) is essential. Also, if the patient had a history of having uric acid nephrolithiasis (kidney stone), uricosuric agents should be avoided in this patient.
