= Lesinurad/allopurinol =

Combination drug

Combination of
- Lesinurad: urate transporter inhibitor
- Allopurinol: xanthine oxidase inhibitor

Clinical data
- Trade names: Duzallo
- AHFS/Drugs.com: Professional Drug Facts
- Routes of administration: By mouth
- ATC code: M04AA51 (WHO)

Legal status
- Legal status: US: ℞-only; EU: Rx-only

Identifiers
- CAS Number: 1372858-63-3
- KEGG: D11175

Lesinurad/allopurinol (trade name Duzallo) is a fixed-dose combination drug for the treatment of gout. It contains 200 mg of lesinurad and 300 mg of allopurinol. In August 2017, the US Food and Drug Administration approved it for the treatment of hyperuricemia associated with gout in patients for whom target serum uric acid levels have not been achieved with allopurinol alone. It was approved for medical use in the European Union in August 2018. In February 2019, it was discontinued by its manufacturer for business reasons and is no longer available.
