= Dotinurad =

Medication

Clinical data
- Trade names: Urece
- Other names: FYU-981
- ATC code: M04AB06 (WHO)

Legal status
- Legal status: JP: Rx-only

Identifiers
- IUPAC name: (3,5-dichloro-4-hydroxyphenyl)-(1,1-dioxo-2H-1,3-benzothiazol-3-yl)methanone
- CAS Number: 1285572-51-1
- PubChem CID: 51349053
- DrugBank: DB16145
- ChemSpider: 59718651
- UNII: 305EB53128
- KEGG: D11071
- ChEMBL: ChEMBL4594446

Chemical and physical data
- Formula: C_{14}H_{9}Cl_{2}NO_{4}S
- Molar mass: 358.19 g·mol^{−1}
- 3D model (JSmol): Interactive image
- SMILES: C1N(C2=CC=CC=C2S1(=O)=O)C(=O)C3=CC(=C(C(=C3)Cl)O)Cl
- InChI: InChI=1S/C14H9Cl2NO4S/c15-9-5-8(6-10(16)13(9)18)14(19)17-7-22(20,21)12-4-2-1-3-11(12)17/h1-6,18H,7H2; Key:VOFLAIHEELWYGO-UHFFFAOYSA-N

Dotinurad (Urece) is a drug for the treatment of gout and hyperuricemia. It was developed by Fuji Yakuhin and approved for use in Japan in 2020, and in China in 2024. The drug is continuing clinical trials by Fortress Biotech and regulatory evaluation for approval in North America and Europe.

Dotinurad is a uricosuric that acts as a selective urate reabsorption inhibitor that has uric acid lowering activity by inhibiting URAT1/SLC22A12 receptor. It and epaminurad are structural analogs of benzbromarone.
