= Uricemia =

Uricemia may refer to:

- Hyperuricemia
- Hypouricemia
- Uric acid
