= Benzbromarone =

Chemical compound

Clinical data
- Trade names: Urinorm, Desuric, Normurat, Narcaricin, others
- AHFS/Drugs.com: International Drug Names
- Routes of administration: Oral
- ATC code: M04AB03 (WHO)

Pharmacokinetic data
- Bioavailability: ~50%
- Protein binding: >99%
- Metabolism: Liver (CYP2C9)
- Elimination half-life: 3 hours (30 hours for main active metabolite 6-hydroxybenzbromarone)
- Excretion: Mainly feces Urine (8%)

Identifiers
- IUPAC name: (3,5-dibromo-4-hydroxyphenyl)-(2-ethyl-1-benzofuran-3-yl)methanone
- CAS Number: 3562-84-3
- PubChem CID: 2333
- DrugBank: DB12319
- ChemSpider: 2243
- UNII: 4POG0RL69O
- ChEBI: CHEBI:3023
- ChEMBL: ChEMBL388590
- CompTox Dashboard (EPA): DTXSID4022652
- ECHA InfoCard: 100.020.573

Chemical and physical data
- Formula: C_{17}H_{12}Br_{2}O_{3}
- Molar mass: 424.088 g·mol^{−1}
- 3D model (JSmol): Interactive image
- Melting point: 161 to 163 °C (322 to 325 °F)
- SMILES: Brc1cc(cc(Br)c1O)C(=O)c2c3ccccc3oc2CC
- InChI: InChI=1S/C17H12Br2O3/c1-2-13-15(10-5-3-4-6-14(10)22-13)16(20)9-7-11(18)17(21)12(19)8-9/h3-8,21H,2H2,1H3; Key:WHQCHUCQKNIQEC-UHFFFAOYSA-N

Benzbromarone is a uricosuric agent and weak non-competitive inhibitor of xanthine oxidase used in the treatment of gout. It is a brominated analogue of the withdrawn uricosurics benziodarone and benzarone, and is structurally related to the antiarrhythmic amiodarone.

Benzbromarone was withdrawn from most European countries in 2003 due to the risk of idiosyncratic hepatotoxicity, but remains heavily used in Asia and South America. Despite this risk, it is generally considered highly effective and well tolerated in most patients. Clinical trials dating back to 1981 and as recent as 2022, along with multiple meta-analyses, have reported its superior efficacy compared to both non-uricosuric xanthine oxidase inhibitors (allopurinol and febuxostat) as well as another uricosuric drug, probenecid.

== Medical uses ==
Benzbromarone is primarily indicated for the long-term management of hyperuricemia and chronic gout, especially when first-line treatments like allopurinol fail to reach target serum uric acid levels or produces intolerable adverse effects. It is particularly effective in "underexcretors" (patients with fractional excretion of urate <5.5% and uric acid excretion ≤600 mg/day/1.73 m^{2}), and unlike other uricosurics, is still effective in patients with mild to moderate renal insufficiency (eGFR as low as 20-30 mL/min/1.73 m^{2}).

In East Asian and Southeast Asian countries, benzbromarone is widely considered a first-line treatment, and along with febuxostat, are usually prescribed over allopurinol in gout, particularly due to a significantly more common prevalence of HLA-B*58:01 allele (~10-20% in some populations), which is associated with a 80-100 fold higher risks of serious side effects (DRESS, Stevens-Johnson Syndrome and Toxic Epidermal Necrolysis) in allopurinol usage.

== Pharmacology ==
=== Mechanism of action ===
Benzbromarone is a potent uricosuric agent that effectively reduces serum urate levels primarily by inhibiting its renal reabsorption. Its primary target is the SLC22A12 protein on the luminal membrane of the proximal tubule, which is responsible for the majority of urate reabsorption.

It also acts on the SLC2A9 protein, a voltage-driven transporter that moves urate from the tubular cell into the blood, and has mild inhibitory effects on OAT1. Some sources also suggest it may enhance the intestinal elimination of uric acid.

=== Pharmacokinetics ===
Benzbromarone is partially absorbed following oral administration, with Cmax achieved within 2-3 hours. It is extensively metabolized in the liver, primarily by CYP2C9.

The major metabolite of benzbromarone, 6-hydroxybenzbromarone, retains potent uricosuric activity and has a significantly longer half-life (up to 30 hours) comparing to the parent drug (~3 hours), allowing for benzbromarone's once-daily dosing. It is eliminated primarily via biliary excretion into the feces, with urinary excretion accounting for only about 8% of the administered dose.

Benzbromarone is a very potent inhibitor of CYP2C9. Several analogues of the drug have been developed as CYP2C9 and CYP2C19 inhibitors for use in research. It has also been reported to target tubulin, blocking its polymerization.

== Side effects ==
The most serious side effect of benzbromarone is idiosyncratic liver injury (with a risk of 1/17000 in Europe and possibly higher in Japan), which can manifest as jaundice, choluria, or fatal fulminant hepatitis. Therefore, regular monitoring of liver function is advised, particularly within the first six months of therapy.

Common side effects include diarrhea (3-4%), nausea, vomiting, and abdominal discomfort. Rarely, patients may experience skin rashes, fever, headache, dizziness, or alopecia.

Like all uricosuric agents, benzbromarone increases the risk of kidney stones and renal colic by promoting uric acid excretion. To mitigate this risk, maintaining high fluid intake combined with urinary alkalinization (e.g. sodium bicarbonate) is essential to minimize crystal formation.

== Drug interactions ==
Due to its potent CYP2C9 inhibition effects, benzbromarone can significantly increase the serum concentrations of drugs metabolized by this enzyme, notably warfarin and other coumarin anticoagulants. This interaction drastically potentiates the anticoagulant effect and substantially increases the risk of bleeding. Concurrent use is contraindicated or, if unavoidable, requires close monitoring of the international normalized ratio and a substantial reduction in the anticoagulant dose (one study shows a 36% reduction in daily warfarin dosage might be required).

High-dose aspirin or other salicylates can antagonize the uricosuric effect of benzbromarone.

Benzbromarone should not be used with other uricosuric agents as it may lead to excessive uric acid excretion and increase the risk of kidney stones.

== History ==
Benzbromarone was introduced in the 1970s and was viewed as having few associated serious adverse reactions. It was registered in more than 20 countries throughout Europe, Asia and South America, but never approved in the United States.

In 2003, benzbromarone was withdrawn by Sanofi-Synthélabo in most of Europe, after reports of serious idiosyncratic hepatotoxicity, although it is still marketed in several countries by other drug companies, and remains a popular first-line drug in Asia (especially in China and Japan).
