= Uricosuria =

Uricosuria refers to uric acid in the urine. Urine levels of uric acid can be described as:

- Hyperuricosuria, an abnormally high level of uric acid in the urine
- Hypouricosuria, an abnormally low level of uric acid in the urine

Agents that increase uric acid in the urine are termed uricosurics.
