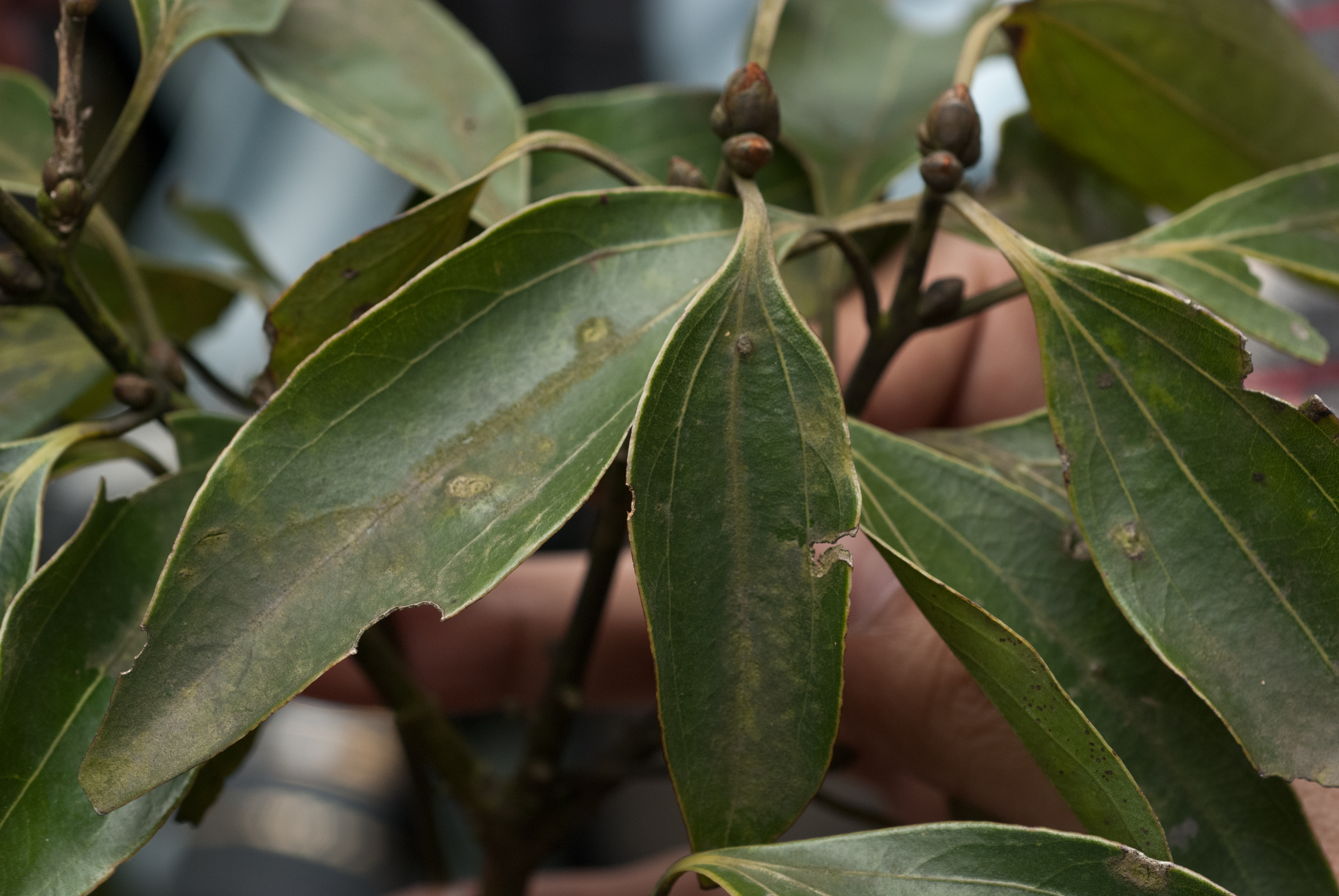

Conservation status
- Near Threatened (IUCN 3.1)

Scientific classification
- Kingdom: Plantae
- Clade: Tracheophytes
- Clade: Angiosperms
- Clade: Magnoliids
- Order: Laurales
- Family: Lauraceae
- Genus: Cinnamomum
- Species: C. osmophloeum

Binomial name
- Cinnamomum osmophloeum Kaneh.

= Cinnamomum osmophloeum =

Species of tree

Cinnamomum osmophloeum, commonly known as pseudocinnamomum or indigenous cinnamon, is a medium-sized evergreen tree in the genus Cinnamomum. It is native to broad-leaved forests of central and northern Taiwan.

Cinnamaldehyde, an essential oil extracted from C. osmophloeum, has numerous commercial uses. Also, it is a xanthine oxidase inhibitor, hence a potential drug for treatment of hyperuricemia and related medical conditions including gout.

== Ethnobotany application ==
Cinnamomum osmophloeum can treat

- Drinking cold drinks often causes diarrhea
- Indigestion
- Colds
- Help smooth blood circulation
- Menstrual irregularities
- Inflammation
- Boost mind

It is also the main ingredient of Wu Jia Pi liquor (五加皮酒), and it can also be used to make cinnamon tea.

The Tsou Aboriginal group of Taiwan call their native Cinnamomum osmophloeum nigi.

== Modern application ==
Cinnamomum osmophloeum is recognized as a good substitute for cinnamon, and the main components of its essential oil are cinnamaldehyde and coumarin.

Compared with cinnamon, C. osmophloeum is even better. In addition to extracting essential oils from the bark, the branches and leaves of C. osmophloeum can also extract essential oils.

The yield of essential oils extracted from the tree's branches and leaves is five times higher than that of its bark, so there is no need to peel off the bark or fell trees. As long as the leaves of C. osmophloeum are collected, the essential oil can be refined, and it can be harvested year after year. This species has the potential to become an excellent non-wood forest product.

== See also ==
- Cinnamon
- Cinnamomum aromaticum (Cassia)
- Japanese cinnamon
- Malabathrum
- Saigon cinnamon
