= Darbinurad =

Clinical data
- Other names: D-0120

Identifiers
- IUPAC name: 2-[1-[[3-(4-cyanophenyl)pyridin-4-yl]sulfanylmethyl]cyclopropyl]acetic acid
- CAS Number: 1877347-38-0
- PubChem CID: 118902135
- ChemSpider: 128992995
- UNII: AYFFM7L5F0

Chemical and physical data
- Formula: C_{18}H_{16}N_{2}O_{2}S
- Molar mass: 324.40 g·mol^{−1}
- 3D model (JSmol): Interactive image
- SMILES: C1CC1(CC(=O)O)CSC2=C(C=NC=C2)C3=CC=C(C=C3)C#N
- InChI: InChI=InChI=1S/C18H16N2O2S/c19-10-13-1-3-14(4-2-13)15-11-20-8-5-16(15)23-12-18(6-7-18)9-17(21)22/h1-5,8,11H,6-7,9,12H2,(H,21,22); Key:RHASGUGQMCVYMQ-UHFFFAOYSA-N

Darbinurad is a investigational new drug that is being evaluated for the treatment of gout. It is a selective urate transporter 1 (URAT1) inhibitor that blocks the reabsorption of uric acid within the renal proximal tubule, thereby reducing serum uric acid concentrations.
