= Ruzinurad =

Chemical compound

Legal status
- Legal status: Investigational

Identifiers
- IUPAC name: 1-(6-Bromoquinolin-4-yl)sulfanylcyclobutane-1-carboxylic acid
- CAS Number: 1638327-48-6
- PubChem CID: 86294127
- ChemSpider: 58872931
- UNII: UP8J9CA76I
- ChEMBL: ChEMBL3746329

Chemical and physical data
- Formula: C_{14}H_{12}BrNO_{2}S
- Molar mass: 338.22 g·mol^{−1}
- 3D model (JSmol): Interactive image
- SMILES: C1CC(C1)(C(=O)O)SC2=C3C=C(C=CC3=NC=C2)Br
- InChI: InChI=1S/C14H12BrNO2S/c15-9-2-3-11-10(8-9)12(4-7-16-11)19-14(13(17)18)5-1-6-14/h2-4,7-8H,1,5-6H2,(H,17,18); Key:QGBWIYLNOBYNDL-UHFFFAOYSA-N

Ruzinurad (SHR4640) is a selective urate transporter 1 (URAT1) inhibitor in development for hyperuricaemia and gout. It is developed by Jiangsu Hengrui. It has been approved for marketing in China since May 2026.
