= Topiroxostat =

Chemical compound

Clinical data
- Trade names: Topiloric, Uriadec
- ATC code: None

Legal status
- Legal status: Approved in Japan

Identifiers
- IUPAC name: 4-[5-(4-Pyridinyl)-1H-1,2,4-triazol-3-yl]-2-pyridinecarbonitrile
- CAS Number: 577778-58-6
- PubChem CID: 5288320
- ChemSpider: 4450517
- UNII: 0J877412JV
- CompTox Dashboard (EPA): DTXSID80206462

Chemical and physical data
- Formula: C_{13}H_{8}N_{6}
- Molar mass: 248.249 g·mol^{−1}
- 3D model (JSmol): Interactive image
- SMILES: C1=CN=CC=C1C2=NC(=NN2)C3=CC(=NC=C3)C#N
- InChI: InChI=1S/C13H8N6/c14-8-11-7-10(3-6-16-11)13-17-12(18-19-13)9-1-4-15-5-2-9/h1-7H,(H,17,18,19); Key:UBVZQGOVTLIHLH-UHFFFAOYSA-N

Topiroxostat (INN; trade names Topiloric, Uriadec) is a drug for the treatment of gout and hyperuricemia. It was approved for use in Japan in June 2013.

Topiroxostat is a xanthine oxidase inhibitor which reduces serum urate levels.
