= Uricosuric =

Drug class

Uricosurics are drugs that increase the excretion of uric acid in the urine, thus reducing the concentration of uric acid in blood plasma. In general, this effect is achieved by action on the proximal tubule of the kidney. Drugs that reduce blood uric acid are not all uricosurics; blood uric acid can be reduced by other mechanisms (see other Antigout Medications).

Uricosurics are often used in the treatment of gout, a disease in which uric acid crystals form deposits in the joints. By decreasing plasma uric acid levels, they help dissolve these crystals, while limiting the formation of new ones. However, the increased uric acid levels in urine can contribute to kidney stones. Thus, use of these drugs is contraindicated in persons already with a high urine concentration of uric acid (hyperuricosuria). In borderline cases, enough water to produce 2 liters of urine per day may be sufficient to permit use of an uricosuric drug.

By their mechanism of action, some uricosurics (such as probenecid) increase the blood plasma concentration of certain other drugs and their metabolic products. While this is occasionally exploitable to good effect (see oseltamivir), assessment of drug interactions is very important when using uricosuric drugs in the presence of other medications.

== Primary uricosurics ==
The primary uricosuric drugs include probenecid, benzbromarone, sulfinpyrazone and dotinurad.

== Secondary uricosurics ==
Drugs with other primary uses, that have known uricosuric properties, include losartan, atorvastatin, and fenofibrate. Although these drugs may have significant uricosuric action, their other significant pharmacological actions in off-label use as a uricosuric requires careful assessment of the patient to achieve the most benefit and least risk.

- Amlodipine
- Atorvastatin (lowers cholesterol)
- Fenofibrate (lowers triglycerides, raises HDL)
- Losartan
- Adrenocorticotropic hormone
- Cortisone

Abdominal surgery also has a uricosuric effect, as well as the potential to precipitate an acute attack of gout.

== Pharmacology ==
In general, uricosuric drugs act on the proximal tubules in the kidneys, where they interfere with the absorption of uric acid from the kidney back into the blood. Several uricosurics are known to act in vitro by blocking the function of a protein encoded by the gene SLC22A12, also known as urate transporter 1 or URAT1. URAT1 is the central mediator in the transport of uric acid from the kidney into the blood. In some persons with loss-of-function mutations of URAT1, the uricosurics benzbromarone and losartan had no effect, suggesting these drugs act on URAT1 in vivo. Thus, uricosuric drugs may be candidates for management in a personalized medicine model.

== Antiuricosurics ==
Antiuricosuric drugs raise serum uric acid levels and lower urine uric acid levels. These drugs include all diuretics, pyrazinoate, pyrazinamide, ethambutol, niacin, and aspirin. The NSAID diclofenac has an antiuricosuric action, which may be partly responsible for the extraordinary toxicity of this drug in vultures.

Pyrazinamide, a drug indicated only for treatment of tuberculosis, is a potent antiuricosuric and, as a consequence, has an off-label use in the diagnosis of causes of abnormal uric acid clearance. It acts on URAT1.

Antiuricosuric drugs are useful for treatment of hypouricemia and perhaps also hyperuricosuria, but are contraindicated in persons with conditions including hyperuricemia and gout.

== See also ==
- Uricosuria
