= Epaminurad =

Chemical compound

Clinical data
- Other names: URC102/UR-1102

Identifiers
- IUPAC name: (3,5-dibromo-4-hydroxyphenyl)-(2,3-dihydropyrido[4,3-b][1,4]oxazin-4-yl)methanone
- CAS Number: 1198153-15-9
- PubChem CID: 44608229
- ChemSpider: 35143241
- UNII: 0YP1ME85GH
- ChEMBL: ChEMBL4640580

Chemical and physical data
- Formula: C_{14}H_{10}Br_{2}N_{2}O_{3}
- Molar mass: 414.053 g·mol^{−1}
- 3D model (JSmol): Interactive image
- SMILES: C1COC2=C(N1C(=O)C3=CC(=C(C(=C3)Br)O)Br)C=NC=C2
- InChI: InChI=InChI=1S/C14H10Br2N2O3/c15-9-5-8(6-10(16)13(9)19)14(20)18-3-4-21-12-1-2-17-7-11(12)18/h1-2,5-7,19H,3-4H2; Key:ZMVGQIIOXCGAFV-UHFFFAOYSA-N

Epaminurad is an investigational new drug being developed by JW Pharmaceutical for the treatment of gout and hyperuricemia. It is a urate-lowering agent that selectively inhibits the human uric acid transporter 1 (hURAT1), promoting urate excretion. As of 2024, epaminurad is undergoing Phase 3 clinical trials to evaluate its efficacy and safety compared to febuxostat in gout patients across multiple Asian countries.
