= C5H4N4S =

The molecular formula C_{5}H_{4}N_{4}S (molar mass : 152.18 g/mol) may refer to:

- Mercaptopurine, an immunosuppressive drug
- Tisopurine, a treatment of gout
