= Hypouricemia =

Lack of uric acid in the blood

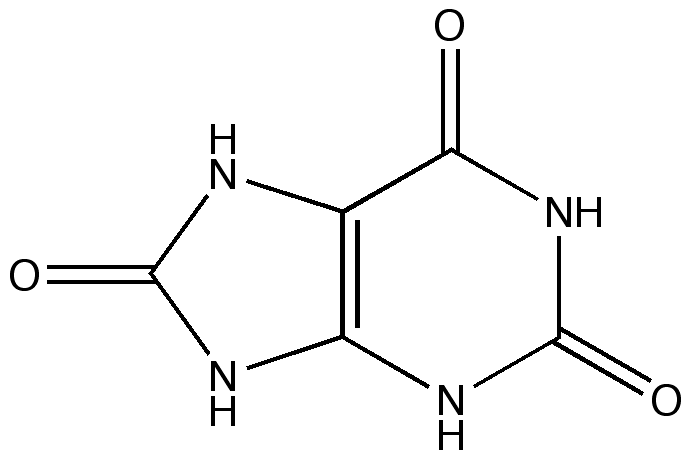
- Uric acid
- Specialty: Endocrinology

Hypouricemia or hypouricaemia is a level of uric acid in blood serum that is below normal. In humans, the normal range of this blood component has a lower threshold set variously in the range of 2 mg/dL to 4 mg/dL, while the upper threshold is 530 μmol/L (6 mg/dL) for women and 619 μmol/L (7 mg/dL) for men. Hypouricemia usually is benign and sometimes is a sign of a medical condition.

== Presentation ==
=== Complications ===
Although normally benign, idiopathic renal hypouricemia may increase the risk of exercise-induced acute kidney failure. There is also evidence that hypouricemia can worsen conditions such as rheumatoid arthritis, especially when combined with low Vitamin C uptake, due to free radical damage.

== Causes ==
Hypouricemia is often benign and not a medical condition, but it is a useful medical sign. It is known occasionally to result in a decreased ability to concentrate urine due to decreased hypertonicity of the renal medulla, and may contribute to hypotension when other risk factors are present. Hypotonicity of the renal medulla is considered normal in the fetus and in infants due to hypouricemia caused by low protein intake.

=== Medication ===
The majority of drugs that contribute to hypouricemia are uricosuric drugs that increase the excretion of uric acid from the blood into the urine. Others include drugs that reduce the production of uric acid: xanthine oxidase inhibitors, urate oxidase (rasburicase), and sevelamer.

=== Diet ===
Hypouricemia is common in vegetarians and vegans due to the low purine content of most vegetarian diets. Vegetarian diet has been found to result in mean serum uric acid values as low as 239 μmol/L (2.7 mg/dL). A vegetarian diet is typically seen as beneficial with respect to conditions such as gout.

Transient hypouricemia sometimes is produced by total parenteral nutrition. total parenteral nutrition may produce hypouricemia followed shortly by acute gout, a condition normally associated with hyperuricemia.

=== Genetics ===
A genetic mutation in Dalmatian dogs causes hypouricemia due to a kidney defect that interferes with reabsorption of uric acid. A similar mutation has been reported in a human brother and sister.

In humans, loss-of-function mutations in the gene URAT1 are associated with presecretory reabsorption defects.

=== Medical conditions ===
Medical conditions that can cause hypouricemia include:

- Multiple sclerosis
- Purine nucleoside phosphorylase (PNP) deficiency

== Treatment ==
Idiopathic hypouricemia usually requires no treatment. In some cases, hypouricemia is a medical sign of an underlying condition that does require treatment. For example, if hypouricemia reflects high excretion of uric acid into the urine (hyperuricosuria) with its risk of uric acid nephrolithiasis, the hyperuricosuria may require treatment.

== Prevalence ==
In one study, hypouricemia was found in 4.8% of hospitalized women and 6.5% of hospitalized men. (The definition was less than 0.14 mmol/L for women and less than 0.20 mmol/L in men.)

== See also ==
- Hyperuricemia
