= Verinurad =

Chemical compound

Clinical data
- Other names: RDEA-3170; RDEA3170

Legal status
- Legal status: Investigational

Identifiers
- IUPAC name: 2-[3-(4-Cyanonaphthalen-1-yl)pyridin-4-yl]sulfanyl-2-methylpropanoic acid
- CAS Number: 1352792-74-5
- PubChem CID: 54767229
- IUPHAR/BPS: 9327
- DrugBank: DB11873
- UNII: 12WJ62D047
- KEGG: D11129
- ChEMBL: ChEMBL3707347

Chemical and physical data
- Formula: C_{20}H_{16}N_{2}O_{2}S
- Molar mass: 348.42 g·mol^{−1}
- 3D model (JSmol): Interactive image
- SMILES: CC(C)(C(=O)O)SC1=C(C=NC=C1)C2=CC=C(C3=CC=CC=C32)C#N
- InChI: InChI=1S/C20H16N2O2S/c1-20(2,19(23)24)25-18-9-10-22-12-17(18)16-8-7-13(11-21)14-5-3-4-6-15(14)16/h3-10,12H,1-2H3,(H,23,24); Key:YYBOLPLTQDKXPM-UHFFFAOYSA-N

Verinurad is a selective URAT1 inhibitor developed for gout and heart failure by AstraZeneca.
