= Isobromindione =

Chemical compound

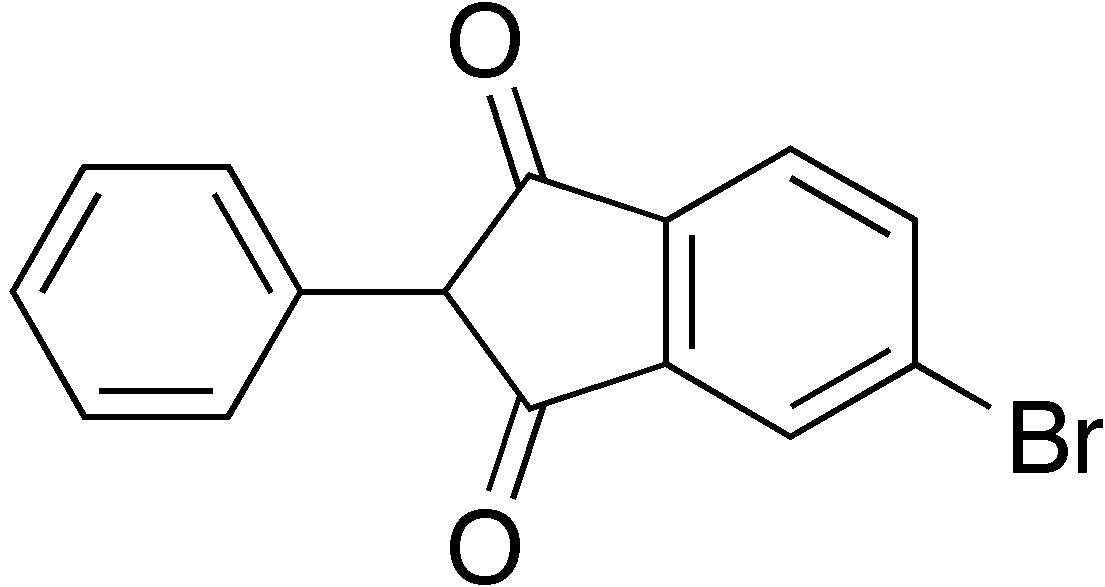

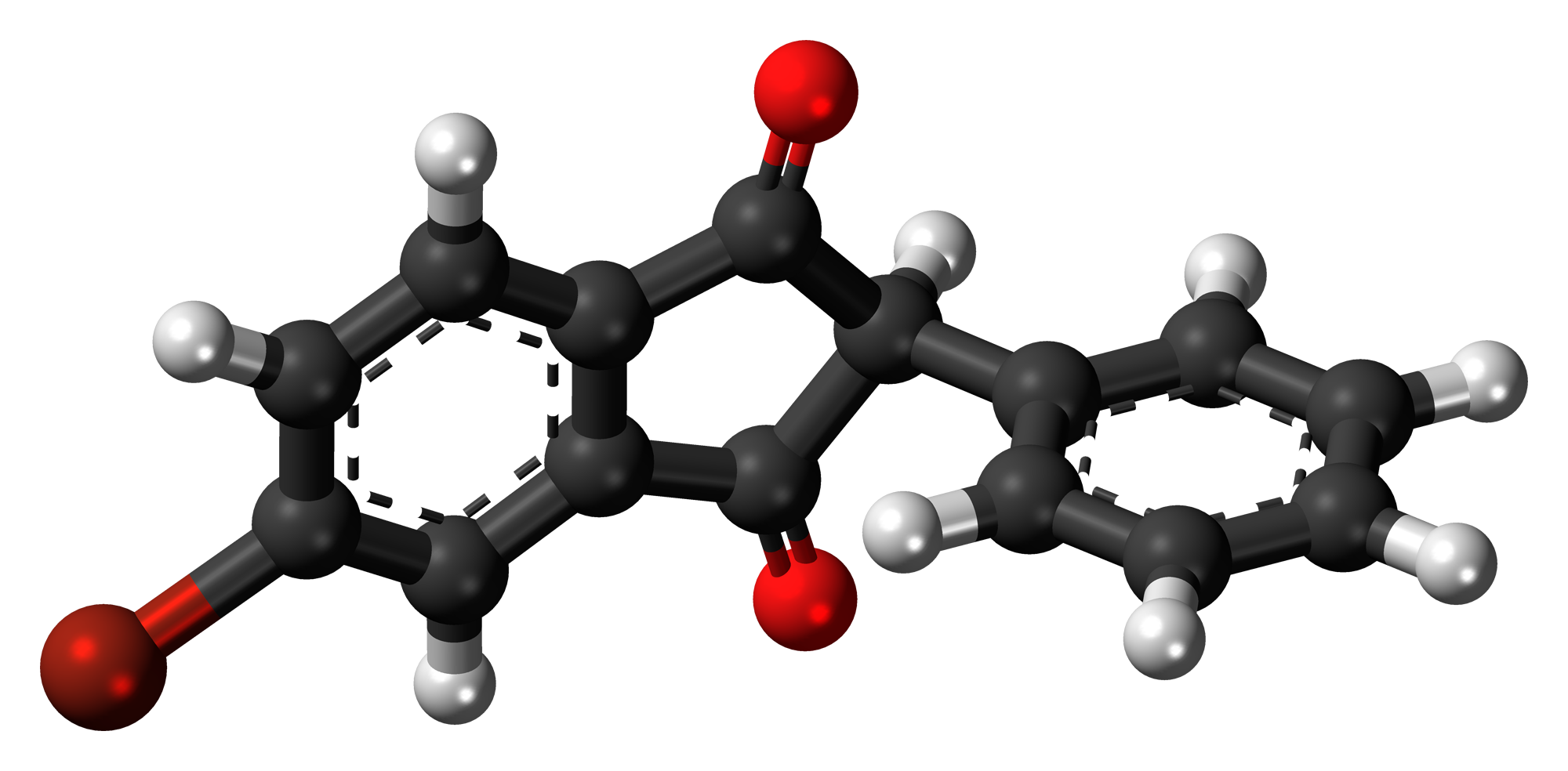

Clinical data
- ATC code: M04AB04 (WHO)

Identifiers
- IUPAC name: 5-Bromo-2-phenyl-1H-indene-1,3(2H)-dione
- CAS Number: 1470-35-5
- PubChem CID: 68953
- ChemSpider: 62176
- UNII: J1J87P409K
- KEGG: D07279
- CompTox Dashboard (EPA): DTXSID90862674
- ECHA InfoCard: 100.014.546

Chemical and physical data
- Formula: C_{15}H_{9}BrO_{2}
- Molar mass: 301.139 g·mol^{−1}
- 3D model (JSmol): Interactive image
- SMILES: c1ccc(cc1)C2C(=O)c3ccc(cc3C2=O)Br
- InChI: InChI=1S/C15H9BrO2/c16-10-6-7-11-12(8-10)15(18)13(14(11)17)9-4-2-1-3-5-9/h1-8,13H; Key:QFLZIWVSQDZLNW-UHFFFAOYSA-N

Isobromindione is a drug used in the treatment of gout.
