= Sulfinpyrazone =

Chemical compound

Clinical data
- Trade names: Anturan, Anturane, Apo-sulfinpyrazone
- AHFS/Drugs.com: Monograph
- MedlinePlus: a682339
- Routes of administration: By mouth intravenous
- ATC code: M04AB02 (WHO)

Pharmacokinetic data
- Protein binding: 98–99%
- Metabolism: liver
- Excretion: kidney

Identifiers
- IUPAC name: 1,2-diphenyl-4-[2-(phenylsulfinyl)ethyl]pyrazolidine-3,5-dione
- CAS Number: 57-96-5
- PubChem CID: 5342
- IUPHAR/BPS: 5826
- DrugBank: DB01138
- ChemSpider: 5149
- UNII: V6OFU47K3W
- KEGG: D00449
- ChEBI: CHEBI:9342
- ChEMBL: ChEMBL832
- CompTox Dashboard (EPA): DTXSID0023618
- ECHA InfoCard: 100.000.325

Chemical and physical data
- Formula: C_{23}H_{20}N_{2}O_{3}S
- Molar mass: 404.48 g·mol^{−1}
- 3D model (JSmol): Interactive image
- SMILES: O=C2N(c1ccccc1)N(C(=O)C2CCS(=O)c3ccccc3)c4ccccc4
- InChI: InChI=1S/C23H20N2O3S/c26-22-21(16-17-29(28)20-14-8-3-9-15-20)23(27)25(19-12-6-2-7-13-19)24(22)18-10-4-1-5-11-18/h1-15,21H,16-17H2; Key:MBGGBVCUIVRRBF-UHFFFAOYSA-N

Sulfinpyrazone is a uricosuric medication used to treat gout. It also sometimes is used to reduce platelet aggregation by inhibiting degranulation of platelets which reduces the release of ADP and thromboxane.

Like other uricosurics, sulfinpyrazone works by competitively inhibiting uric acid reabsorption in the proximal tubule of the kidney.

== Contraindications ==
Sulfinpyrazone must not be used in persons with renal impairment or a history of uric acid kidney stones.

== Research ==
Trial have found that, Sulfinpyrazone taken in specific daily dose immediately following a patient having suffered from a myocardial infarction seem to drastically reduce the incidence of sudden death by as much as 43% and cardiac mortality by 32% in the 24 months following their heart attack.
