= GPATCH8 =

Protein-coding gene in the species Homo sapiens

Identifiers
- Aliases: GPATCH8, GPATC8, KIAA0553, G-patch domain containing 8
- External IDs: OMIM: 614396; MGI: 1918667; GeneCards: GPATCH8

Gene location (Human)
Chr.	Chromosome 17 (human)
Band	17q21.31	Start	44,395,281 bp
Band	17q21.31	End	44,503,430 bp

Gene location (Mouse)
Chr.	Chromosome 11 (mouse)
Band	11|11 D-E1	Start	102,475,915 bp
Band	11|11 D-E1	End	102,556,392 bp
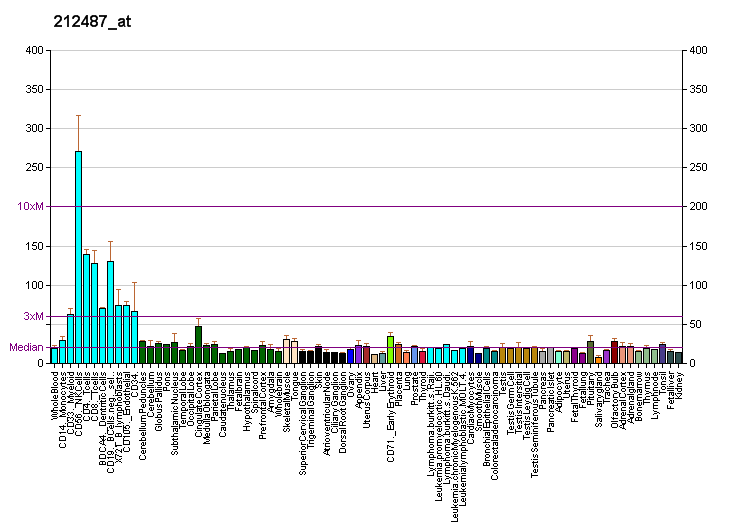

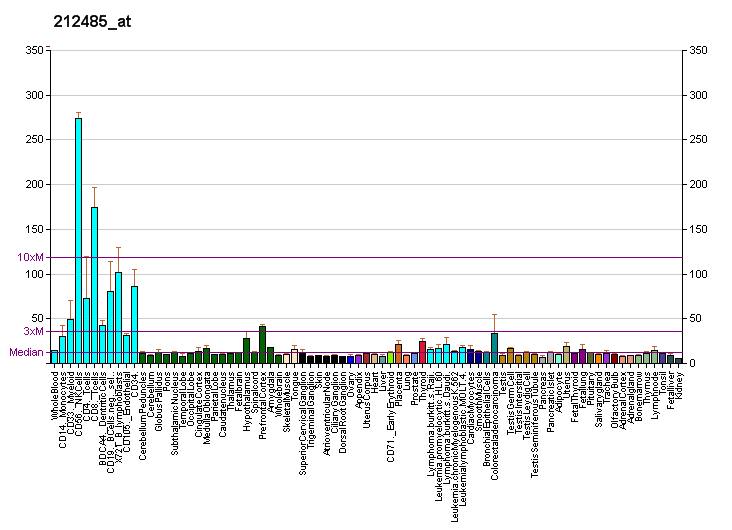
RNA expression pattern
Bgee	Human / Mouse (ortholog); Top expressed in: sural nerve; secondary oocyte; right hemisphere of cerebellum; gastrocnemius muscle; Achilles tendon; nipple; epithelium of colon; external globus pallidus; pylorus; inferior olivary nucleus / Top expressed in: otic placode; saccule; otic vesicle; tail of embryo; zygote; genital tubercle; neural layer of retina; Rostral migratory stream; secondary oocyte; pineal gland; More reference expression data
BioGPS	More reference expression data
Gene ontology
Molecular function	protein binding; metal ion binding; nucleic acid binding; RNA binding
Cellular component	cellular component
Biological process	biological process
Sources:Amigo / QuickGO
Orthologs
Databases	NCBI: entry; OMA: entry
Species	Human	Mouse
Entrez	23131	237943
Ensembl	ENSG00000186566	ENSMUSG00000034621
UniProt	Q9UKJ3	A2A6A1
RefSeq (mRNA)	NM_001002909; NM_001304939; NM_001304940; NM_001304941; NM_001304942 NM_001304943	NM_001159492
RefSeq (protein)	NP_001002909; NP_001291868; NP_001291869; NP_001291870; NP_001291871 NP_001291872	NP_001152964
Location (UCSC)	Chr 17: 44.4 – 44.5 Mb	Chr 11: 102.48 – 102.56 Mb
PubMed search
- Wikidata
View/Edit Human	View/Edit Mouse

G patch domain-containing protein 8 is a protein that in humans is encoded by the GPATCH8 gene.

== Hyperuricemia ==
Hyperuricemia cosegregating with osteogenesis imperfecta has been shown to be associated with a mutation in GPATCH8 using exome sequencing
