= Organic anion transporter 4 =

Organic anion transporter 4 (OAT4) can refer to either of these carrier proteins:

- Solute carrier family 22 member 9 (SLC22A9)
- Solute carrier family 22 member 11 (SLC22A11)
