= Cinchophen =

Chemical compound

Clinical data
- AHFS/Drugs.com: International Drug Names
- ATC code: M04AC02 (WHO)

Identifiers
- IUPAC name: 2-phenylquinoline-4-carboxylic acid
- CAS Number: 132-60-5
- PubChem CID: 8593
- ChemSpider: 8274
- UNII: 39Y533Z02M
- KEGG: D07280
- ChEMBL: ChEMBL348000
- CompTox Dashboard (EPA): DTXSID0040705
- ECHA InfoCard: 100.004.608

Chemical and physical data
- Formula: C_{16}H_{11}NO_{2}
- Molar mass: 249.269 g·mol^{−1}
- 3D model (JSmol): Interactive image
- SMILES: O=C(O)c1c3ccccc3nc(c1)c2ccccc2
- InChI: InChI=1S/C16H11NO2/c18-16(19)13-10-15(11-6-2-1-3-7-11)17-14-9-5-4-8-12(13)14/h1-10H,(H,18,19); Key:YTRMTPPVNRALON-UHFFFAOYSA-N

Cinchophen (trade names Atophan, Quinophan, and Phenaquin) is an analgesic drug that was first produced by Doebner & Gieskel in 1887, it was commercially introduced in 1908 as a treatment for gout. This drug is still used, in combination with Prednisolone, by veterinarians to treat arthritis in animals. It can be prepared starting from anilin, benzaldehyde and pyruvic acid in absolute ethanol. Use of this drug in humans ceased in the 1930s due to the discovery that cinchophen can cause serious liver damage. There is some evidence that it stimulates C-Fos.

== History ==
Cinchophen was first introduced in 1908 as 'Atophan' and used for the treatment of gout and arthritis. It was efficacious at reducing the buildup of uric acid and became a popular medicine. Further studies in 1911 and 1912 were successful in isolating metabolites of cinchophen from human urine. During the 1920s, cases of severe adverse effects such as liver damage and cirrhosis had been clinically observed; the first case of jaundice was recorded in 1923 and the first fatality occurred in 1925. Approximately half of all patients experienced toxic effects and by 1932 there were 32 drugs available that contained cinchophen or its derivatives as their active ingredients, experiments were conducted to determine the drugs pharmacology but the mechanism of drug induced liver injury remained unclear. Cinchophen was considered to be too dangerous for human use in most countries but has applications in veterinary medicine as a treatment for osteoarthritis in dogs.

== Available forms ==
Cinchophen can be administered orally in tablet form or intravenously in liquid form.

== Toxicity and side-effects ==
Cinchophen toxicity may present 6 to 12 hours after administration. Symptoms can include hyperventilation, hyperthermia (fever), gastrointestinal discomfort, diarrhoea, hives, vomiting, delirium, hepatitis, jaundice, anorexia, convulsions, coma and death. Fatty degeneration of the heart and kidneys, necrosis of hepatic cells in addition to yellow atrophy of the liver have been recorded in autopsy findings.

== Treatment ==
Cinchophen administration should be immediately ceased if symptoms occur. There is no cure for acute cinchophen poisoning but early diagnosis and symptomatic treatments may be effective. Calcium lactate may be used to treat hives and oral or intravenous glucose can relieve gastrointestinal symptoms. If glucose is given, insulin may be needed to protect the liver from further damage. Oral alkali treatments can combat acidosis and anti-emetics may be required to manage nausea and vomiting.

== Veterinary medicine ==
Cinchophen is the main active ingredient in prednoleucotropin (PLT), a medication used in the treatment of osteoarthritis in dogs. PLT may produce analgesic and anti-pyretic effects at higher doses. Osteoarthritic dogs treated with PLT have shown significant improvement of joint mobility, stiffness, lameness and weight bearing capacity. When administered correctly, PLT has shown similar clinical efficacy to phenylbutazone. The effects of PLT toxicity in dogs are similar to cinchophen toxicity in humans and include hepatotoxicity and gastric ulceration.
