= Tisopurine =

Chemical compound

Clinical data
- AHFS/Drugs.com: International Drug Names
- ATC code: M04AA02 (WHO)

Identifiers
- IUPAC name: 1,2-Dihydro-4H-pyrazolo[3,4-d]pyrimidine-4-thione
- CAS Number: 5334-23-6
- PubChem CID: 667510
- ChemSpider: 580886
- UNII: 79F9I2R16M
- KEGG: D07278
- CompTox Dashboard (EPA): DTXSID90201488
- ECHA InfoCard: 100.023.865

Chemical and physical data
- Formula: C_{5}H_{4}N_{4}S
- Molar mass: 152.18 g·mol^{−1}
- 3D model (JSmol): Interactive image
- SMILES: c1c2c([nH]n1)ncnc2S
- InChI: InChI=1S/C5H4N4S/c10-5-3-1-8-9-4(3)6-2-7-5/h1-2H,(H2,6,7,8,9,10); Key:PYAOPMWCFSVFOT-UHFFFAOYSA-N

Tisopurine (or thiopurinol) is a drug used in the treatment of gout in some countries. It reduces uric acid production through inhibiting an early stage in its production.
