= SLC2A9 =

Protein-coding gene in the species Homo sapiens

Identifiers
- Aliases: SLC2A9, solute carrier family 2 (facilitated glucose transporter), member 9, GLUT9, GLUTX, UAQTL2, URATv1, solute carrier family 2 member 9
- External IDs: OMIM: 606142; MGI: 2152844; GeneCards: SLC2A9

Gene location (Human)
| Chr. | Chromosome 4 (human) |
| Band | 4p16.1 | Start | 9,771,153 bp |
| Band | 4p16.1 | End | 10,054,936 bp |

Gene location (Mouse)
| Chr. | Chromosome 5 (mouse) |
| Band | 5|5 B3 | Start | 38,506,616 bp |
| Band | 5|5 B3 | End | 38,660,486 bp |
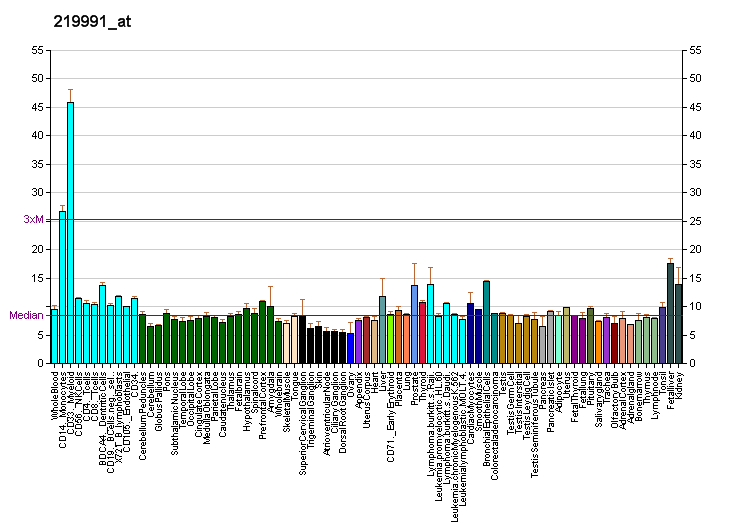
RNA expression pattern
| Bgee | Human / Mouse (ortholog); Top expressed in: buccal mucosa cell; monocyte; human kidney; right lobe of liver; testicle; pancreatic ductal cell; granulocyte; gonad; right lung; salivary gland / Top expressed in: connecting tubule; granulocyte; zygote; jejunum; liver; secondary oocyte; primary oocyte; morula; distal tubule; thymus; More reference expression data |
| BioGPS | More reference expression data |
Gene ontology
| Molecular function | transporter activity; carbohydrate:proton symporter activity; glucose transmembrane transporter activity; urate transmembrane transporter activity; transmembrane transporter activity |
| Cellular component | apical plasma membrane; basolateral plasma membrane; plasma membrane; membrane; integral component of membrane; nuclear envelope; integral component of plasma membrane |
| Biological process | urate metabolic process; carbohydrate transport; transmembrane transport; hexose transmembrane transport; urate transport; proton transmembrane transport; glucose transmembrane transport |
Sources:Amigo / QuickGO
Orthologs
| Databases | NCBI: entry; OMA: entry |
| Species | Human | Mouse |
| Entrez | 56606 | 117591 |
| Ensembl | ENSG00000109667 | ENSMUSG00000005107 |
| UniProt | Q9NRM0 | Q3T9X0 |
| RefSeq (mRNA) | NM_001001290; NM_020041 | NM_001012363; NM_001102414; NM_001102415; NM_145559 |
| RefSeq (protein) | NP_001001290; NP_064425 | NP_001012363; NP_001095884; NP_001095885; NP_663534 |
| Location (UCSC) | Chr 4: 9.77 – 10.05 Mb | Chr 5: 38.51 – 38.66 Mb |
| PubMed search |
- Wikidata
| View/Edit Human | View/Edit Mouse |

Solute carrier family 2, facilitated glucose transporter member 9 is a protein that in humans is encoded by the SLC2A9 gene.

This gene encodes a member of the SLC2A facilitative glucose transporter family. Members of this family play a significant role in maintaining glucose homeostasis. The encoded protein may play a role in the development and survival of chondrocytes in cartilage matrices. Two transcript variants encoding distinct isoforms have been identified for this gene.

SLC2A9 has also recently been found to transport uric acid, and genetic variants of the transporter have been linked to increased risk of development of both hyperuricemia, gout and Alzheimer's disease.

== See also ==
- Glucose transporter
- Solute carrier family
