= ATC code M04 =

ATC code M04 Antigout preparations is a therapeutic subgroup of the Anatomical Therapeutic Chemical Classification System, a system of alphanumeric codes developed by the World Health Organization (WHO) for the classification of drugs and other medical products. Subgroup M04 is part of the anatomical group M Musculo-skeletal system.

Codes for veterinary use (ATCvet codes) can be created by placing the letter Q in front of the human ATC code: for example, QM04.
National versions of the ATC classification may include additional codes not present in this list, which follows the WHO version.

== M04A Antigout preparations ==
=== M04AA Preparations inhibiting uric acid production ===
M04AA01 Allopurinol
M04AA02 Tisopurine
M04AA03 Febuxostat
M04AA51 Allopurinol, combinations

=== M04AB Preparations increasing uric acid excretion ===
M04AB01 Probenecid
M04AB02 Sulfinpyrazone
M04AB03 Benzbromarone
M04AB04 Isobromindione
M04AB05 Lesinurad
M04AB06 Dotinurad

=== M04AC Preparations with no effect on uric acid metabolism ===
M04AC01 Colchicine
M04AC02 Cinchophen
M04AC51 Colchicine and probenecid

=== M04AX Other antigout preparations ===
M04AX01 Urate oxidase
M04AX02 Pegloticase
