= SLC22A12 =

Mammalian protein found in Homo sapiens

Identifiers
- Aliases: SLC22A12, solute carrier family 22 (organic anion/urate transporter), member 12, OAT4L, RST, URAT1, solute carrier family 22 member 12
- External IDs: OMIM: 607096; MGI: 1195269; GeneCards: SLC22A12

Gene location (Human)
Chr.	Chromosome 11 (human)
Band	11q13.1	Start	64,590,641 bp
Band	11q13.1	End	64,602,353 bp

Gene location (Mouse)
Chr.	Chromosome 19 (mouse)
Band	19|19 A	Start	6,585,875 bp
Band	19|19 A	End	6,593,062 bp
RNA expression pattern
Bgee	Human / Mouse (ortholog); Top expressed in: renal cortex; renal medulla; mammary gland; breast; human kidney; lactiferous gland; adipose tissue; liver; subcutaneous adipose tissue; serous sac / Top expressed in: renal cortex; human kidney; right kidney; proximal tubule; outer renal medulla; proximal convoluted tubule; proximal straight tubule; distal tubule; primary visual cortex; hypothalamus; More reference expression data
BioGPS	n/a
Gene ontology
Molecular function	sodium-independent organic anion transmembrane transporter activity; PDZ domain binding; inorganic anion exchanger activity; urate transmembrane transporter activity; transmembrane transporter activity
Cellular component	integral component of plasma membrane; extracellular exosome; apical plasma membrane; membrane; plasma membrane; integral component of membrane; brush border membrane
Biological process	sodium-independent organic anion transport; urate transport; cellular homeostasis; ion transport; urate metabolic process; transmembrane transport; organic acid transmembrane transport; inorganic anion transport; transport; organic anion transport
Sources:Amigo / QuickGO
Orthologs
Databases	NCBI: entry; OMA: entry
Species	Human	Mouse
Entrez	116085	20521
Ensembl	ENSG00000197891	ENSMUSG00000061742
UniProt	Q96S37	Q8CFZ5
RefSeq (mRNA)	NM_001276326; NM_001276327; NM_144585; NM_153378	NM_009203
RefSeq (protein)	NP_001263255; NP_001263256; NP_653186; NP_700357	NP_033229
Location (UCSC)	Chr 11: 64.59 – 64.6 Mb	Chr 19: 6.59 – 6.59 Mb
PubMed search
- Wikidata
View/Edit Human	View/Edit Mouse

Solute carrier family 22 (organic anion/cation transporter), member 12, also known as SLC22A12 and URAT1, is a protein which in humans is encoded by the SLC22A12 gene.

== Function ==
The protein encoded by this gene is a urate transporter and urate-anion exchanger which regulates the level of urate in the blood. This protein is an integral membrane protein primarily found in kidney. Two transcript variants encoding different isoforms have been found for this gene.

== Clinical significance ==
Numerous single nucleotide polymorphisms of this gene are significantly associated with altered (increased or decreased) reabsorption of uric acid by the kidneys. Respectively, these altered rates of reabsorption contribute to hyperuricemia and hypouricemia.

== Interactions ==
SLC22A12 has been shown to have a protein-protein interaction with PDZK1.

== Inhibition ==
Lesinurad, ruzinurad, darbinurad, verinurad, epaminurad, lingdolinurad, xininurad, puliginurad and dotinurad are urate transporter inhibitors that have been approved to treat gout. Lesinurad enhances urate excretion by inhibition the tubular re-absorption. Probenecid also facilitates uric acid secretion.

== See also ==
- Solute carrier family
