= CARMIL1 =

Protein found in humans

Available structures
PDB	Ortholog search: PDBe RCSB
PDB	List of PDB id codes 3LK2, 3LK3

Identifiers
- Aliases: CARMIL1, CARMIL, CARMIL1a, LRRC16, dJ501N12.1, dJ501N12.5, LRRC16A, leucine rich repeat containing 16A, capping protein regulator and myosin 1 linker 1
- External IDs: OMIM: 609593; MGI: 1915982; HomoloGene: 9757; GeneCards: CARMIL1; OMA:CARMIL1 - orthologs

Gene location (Human)
Chr.	Chromosome 6 (human)
Band	6p22.2	Start	25,279,078 bp
Band	6p22.2	End	25,620,530 bp

Gene location (Mouse)
Chr.	Chromosome 13 (mouse)
Band	13|13 A3.1	Start	24,196,327 bp
Band	13|13 A3.1	End	24,464,778 bp
RNA expression pattern
Bgee	Human / Mouse (ortholog); Top expressed in: oocyte; secondary oocyte; Achilles tendon; mucosa of transverse colon; left coronary artery; right hemisphere of cerebellum; thoracic aorta; Descending thoracic aorta; ascending aorta; testicle / Top expressed in: zygote; secondary oocyte; molar; saccule; primary oocyte; otic vesicle; spermatid; vestibular sensory epithelium; otic placode; medullary collecting duct; More reference expression data
BioGPS	n/a
Gene ontology
Molecular function	protein-containing complex binding; protein binding
Cellular component	filamentous actin; cell projection; membrane; plasma membrane; macropinosome; cell leading edge; extracellular exosome; cytoskeleton; nucleus; lamellipodium; cytoplasm; cytosol; nuclear speck
Biological process	barbed-end actin filament uncapping; positive regulation of lamellipodium organization; negative regulation of barbed-end actin filament capping; positive regulation of actin filament polymerization; ruffle organization; actin filament organization; positive regulation of cell migration; actin filament network formation; blood coagulation; positive regulation of substrate adhesion-dependent cell spreading; macropinocytosis; urate metabolic process; cell migration; positive regulation of stress fiber assembly; lamellipodium assembly
Sources:Amigo / QuickGO
Orthologs
Species	Human	Mouse
Entrez	55604	68732
Ensembl	ENSG00000079691	ENSMUSG00000021338
UniProt	Q5VZK9	Q6EDY6
RefSeq (mRNA)	NM_001173977; NM_017640	NM_026825; NM_177807; NM_001311122; NM_001384122
RefSeq (protein)	NP_001167448; NP_060110	NP_001298051; NP_081101; NP_001371051
Location (UCSC)	Chr 6: 25.28 – 25.62 Mb	Chr 13: 24.2 – 24.46 Mb
PubMed search
- Wikidata
View/Edit Human	View/Edit Mouse

CARMIL1 is a protein that in humans is encoded by the CARMIL1 gene. The gene is also known as LRRC16, LRRC16A, CARMIL, or CARMIL1a.
