= SLC22A11 =

Protein-coding gene in the species Homo sapiens

Identifiers
- Aliases: SLC22A11, OAT4, hOAT4, solute carrier family 22 member 11
- External IDs: OMIM: 607097; GeneCards: SLC22A11

Gene location (Human)
Chr.	Chromosome 11 (human)
Band	11q13.1	Start	64,555,690 bp
Band	11q13.1	End	64,572,875 bp
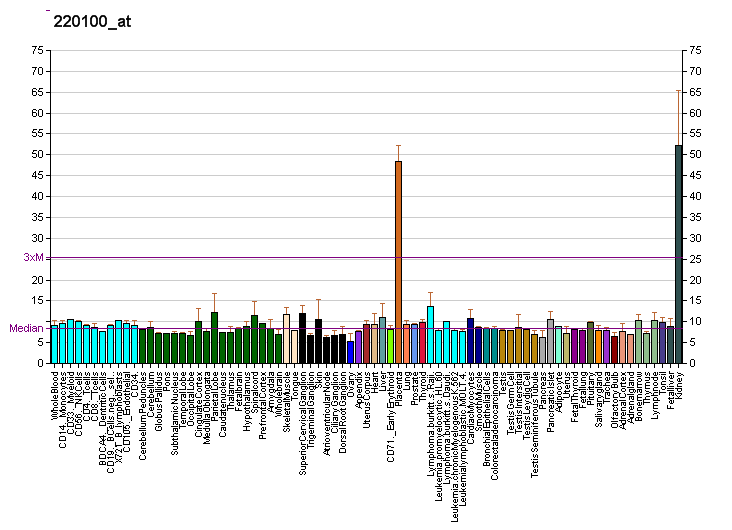
RNA expression pattern
Bgee	Human / Mouse (ortholog); Top expressed in: placenta; kidney tubule; metanephric glomerulus; human kidney; testicle; corpus epididymis; caput epididymis; tail of epididymis; renal medulla; right adrenal cortex / n/a; More reference expression data
BioGPS	More reference expression data
Gene ontology
Molecular function	organic anion transmembrane transporter activity; protein binding; inorganic anion exchanger activity; transmembrane transporter activity; sodium-independent organic anion transmembrane transporter activity; urate transmembrane transporter activity
Cellular component	integral component of membrane; plasma membrane; integral component of plasma membrane; extracellular exosome; apical plasma membrane; external side of plasma membrane; membrane
Biological process	sodium-independent organic anion transport; ion transport; urate metabolic process; organic anion transport; transmembrane transport; inorganic anion transport; urate transport; organic acid transmembrane transport; transport
Sources:Amigo / QuickGO
Orthologs
Databases	NCBI: entry; OMA: entry
Species	Human	Mouse
Entrez	55867	n/a
Ensembl	ENSG00000168065	n/a
UniProt	Q9NSA0	n/a
RefSeq (mRNA)	NM_001307985; NM_018484	n/a
RefSeq (protein)	NP_001294914; NP_060954	n/a
Location (UCSC)	Chr 11: 64.56 – 64.57 Mb	n/a
PubMed search		n/a
- Wikidata
View/Edit Human

Solute carrier family 22 member 11 is a protein that in humans is encoded by the SLC22A11 gene.

The protein encoded by this gene is involved in the sodium-independent transport and excretion of organic anions, some of which are potentially toxic. The encoded protein is an integral membrane protein and is found mainly in the kidney and in the placenta, where it may act to prevent potentially harmful organic anions from reaching the fetus.

== See also ==
- Solute carrier family
