= Hyperuricosuria =

Excess uric acid in the urine

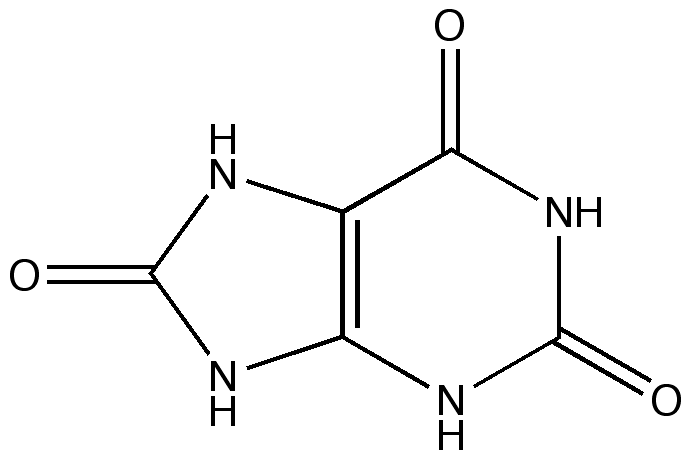
- Uric acid
- Specialty: Nephrology, urology

Hyperuricosuria is a medical term referring to the presence of excessive amounts of uric acid in the urine. For men this is at a rate greater than 800 mg/day, and for women, 750 mg/day. Notable direct causes of hyperuricosuria are dissolution of uric acid crystals in the kidneys or urinary bladder, and hyperuricemia. Notable indirect causes include uricosuric drugs, rapid breakdown of bodily tissues containing large quantities of DNA and RNA, and a diet high in purine.

Medications that may contribute to the cure or amelioration of hyperuricosuria include allopurinol which acts by inhibiting xanthine oxidase and reducing uric acid production. Hyperuricosuria may be a medical sign of:

- Gout (very common)
- Kidney stones of uric acid (uric acid nephrolithiasis)
- Acute uric acid nephropathy
- Acute kidney failure
- Tumor lysis syndrome
- Fanconi syndrome
- Dent's disease (very rare)

== Classification ==
Acute hyperuricosuria is a common complication of tumor lysis syndrome. This syndrome appears not to contribute to gout and to uric acid nephrolithiasis, which is evidence that these two conditions have chronic, not acute, causes.

Chronic hyperuricosuria is associated with gout and uric acid nephrolithiasis. However, both conditions can occur in the absence of hyperuricosuria. Treatment of gout with uricosuric drugs can lead to uric acid nephrolithiasis.

== Treatment ==
If neither hyperuricemia nor gout is present, then the risk of uric acid nephrolithiasis can be reduced by the use of antiuricosuric drugs. One should also consider eating a low purine diet. Additionally, making the urine pH more alkaline is protective.
