= Xanthine oxidase inhibitor =

Substance inhibiting xanthine oxidase

A xanthine oxidase inhibitor is any substance that inhibits the activity of xanthine oxidase, an enzyme involved in purine metabolism. In humans, inhibition of xanthine oxidase reduces the production of uric acid, and several medications that inhibit xanthine oxidase are indicated for treatment of hyperuricemia and related medical conditions including gout. Xanthine oxidase inhibitors are being investigated for management of reperfusion injury.

Xanthine oxidase inhibitors are of two kinds: purine analogues and others. Purine analogues include allopurinol, oxypurinol, and tisopurine. Others include febuxostat, topiroxostat, and inositols (phytic acid and myo-inositol).

In experiments, numerous natural products have been found to inhibit xanthine oxidase in vitro or in model animals (mice, rats). These include three flavonoids that occur in many different fruits and vegetables: kaempferol, myricetin, and quercetin. More generally, planar flavones and flavonols with a 7-hydroxyl group inhibit xanthine oxidase. An essential oil extracted from Cinnamomum osmophloeum inhibits xanthine oxidase in mice. The natural product propolis from selected sources inhibits xanthine oxidase in rats; the specific substance responsible for this inhibition has not been identified, and the generality of these findings is unknown. An extract of leaves of Pistacia integerrima also inhibits xanthine oxidase at a level that appears to merit further research.

In folk medicine the tree fern Cyathea spinulosa (formerly Alsophila spinulosa) has been used for gout, but its most active component, caffeic acid, is only a weak inhibitor of xanthine oxidase.
