= Uric acid =

Organic compound

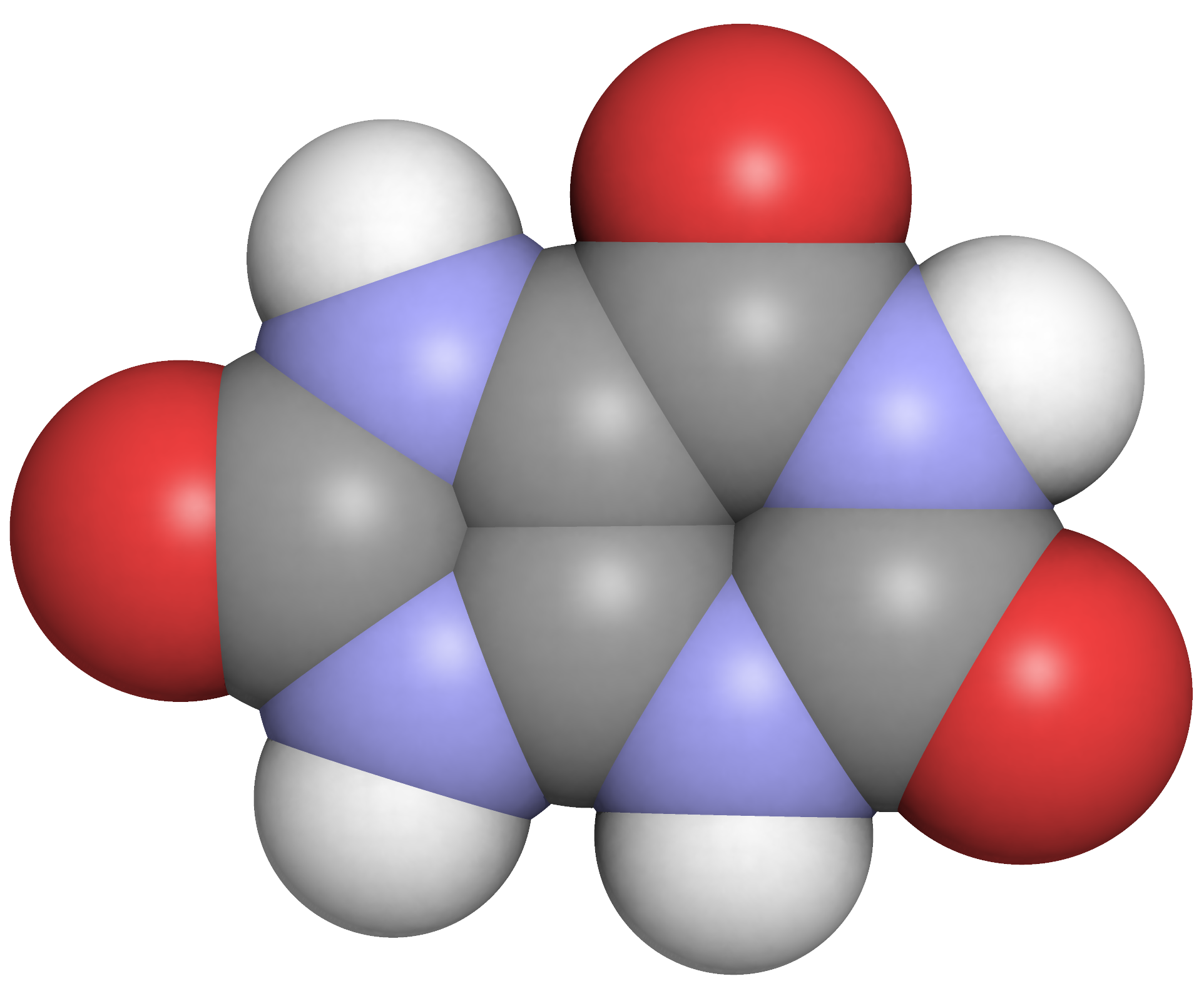

Names
- Preferred IUPAC name 7,9-Dihydro-1H-purine-2,6,8(3H)-trione
- Other names 2,6,8-Trioxypurine; 2,6,8-Trihydroxypurine; 2,6,8-Trioxopurine; 1H-Purine-2,6,8-trione

Identifiers
CAS Number	69-93-2
3D model (JSmol)	lactam form: Interactive image; intermediate form: Interactive image; lactim form: Interactive image; urate monoanion: Interactive image
Beilstein Reference	156158
ChEBI	CHEBI:27226
ChEMBL	ChEMBL792
ChemSpider	1142
DrugBank	DB01696
ECHA InfoCard	100.000.655
EC Number	200-720-7
IUPHAR/BPS	4731
KEGG	C00366
MeSH	Uric+Acid
PubChem CID	1175
UNII	268B43MJ25
CompTox Dashboard (EPA)	DTXSID3042508
- InChI: InChI=1S/C5H4N4O3/c10-3-1-2(7-4(11)6-1)8-5(12)9-3/h5,12H,(H,9,10)(H,7,8,11) Key: DZGSAURIFGGOJK-UHFFFAOYSA-N
- SMILES: lactam form: O=C1Nc2nc(=O)nc2C(=O)N1; intermediate form: Oc0nc(O)nc1c0NC(=O)N1; lactim form: Oc0nc(O)nc1c0N=C(O)N1; urate monoanion: Oc0nc(O)nc1c0N=C([O-])N1

Properties
Chemical formula	C_{5}H_{4}N_{4}O_{3}
Molar mass	168.112 g·mol^{−1}
Appearance	White crystals
Melting point	300 °C (572 °F; 573 K)
Solubility in water	6 mg/100 mL (at 20 °C)
log P	−1.107
Acidity (pK_{a})	5.6
Basicity (pK_{b})	8.4
Magnetic susceptibility (χ)	−6.62×10^{−5} cm^{3} mol^{−1}

Thermochemistry
Heat capacity (C)	166.15 J K^{−1} mol^{−1} (at 24.0 °C)
Std molar entropy (S^{⦵}_{298})	173.2 J K^{−1} mol^{−1}
Std enthalpy of formation (Δ_{f}H^{⦵}_{298})	−619.69 to −617.93 kJ mol^{−1}
Std enthalpy of combustion (Δ_{c}H^{⦵}_{298})	−1921.2 to −1919.56 kJ mol^{−1}
- Except where otherwise noted, data are given for materials in their standard state (at 25 °C [77 °F], 100 kPa). verify (what is ?) Infobox references

Uric acid is a heterocyclic compound of carbon, nitrogen, oxygen, and hydrogen with the formula C_{5}H_{4}N_{4}O_{3}. It forms ions and salts known as urates and acid urates, such as ammonium acid urate. Uric acid is a product of the metabolic breakdown of purine nucleotides, and it is a normal component of urine. High blood concentrations of uric acid can lead to gout and are associated with other medical conditions, including diabetes and the formation of ammonium acid urate kidney stones.

== Chemistry ==
Uric acid was first isolated from kidney stones in 1776 by Swedish chemist Carl Wilhelm Scheele. In 1882, the Ukrainian chemist Ivan Horbaczewski first synthesized uric acid by melting urea with glycine.

Uric acid displays lactam–lactim tautomerism. Uric acid crystallizes in the lactam form, with computational chemistry also indicating that tautomer to be the most stable. Uric acid is a diprotic acid with pK_{a1} = 5.4 and pK_{a2} = 10.3. At physiological pH, urate predominates in solution.

Lactam, a stable tautomer form of uric acid

Urate ion, a conjugate base of uric acid

== Biochemistry ==
The enzyme xanthine oxidase (XO) catalyzes the formation of uric acid from xanthine and hypoxanthine. XO, which is found in mammals, functions primarily as a dehydrogenase and rarely as an oxidase, despite its name. Xanthine, in turn, is produced from other purines. Xanthine oxidase is a large enzyme whose active site consists of the metal molybdenum bound to sulfur and oxygen. Uric acid is released in hypoxic conditions (low oxygen saturation).

=== Water solubility ===
In general, the water solubility of uric acid and its alkali metal and alkaline earth salts is rather low. All these salts exhibit greater solubility in hot water than cold, allowing for easy recrystallization. This low solubility is significant for the etiology of gout. The solubility of the acid and its salts in ethanol is also very low or negligible.

Solubility of urate salts (grams of water per gram of compound)
Compound	Cold water	Boiling water
Uric acid	15,000	2,000
Ammonium hydrogen urate	—	1,600
Lithium hydrogen urate	370	39
Sodium hydrogen urate	1,175	124
Potassium hydrogen urate	790	75
Magnesium dihydrogen diurate	3,750	160
Calcium dihydrogen diurate	603	276
Disodium urate	77	—
Dipotassium urate	44	35
Calcium urate	1,500	1,440
Strontium urate	4,300	1,790
Barium urate	7,900	2,700

The figures given indicate what mass of water is required to dissolve a unit mass of compound indicated. The lower the number, the more soluble the substance in the said solvent.

=== Fructose-related uric acid production ===
Under conditions of an ordinary diet with low levels of fructose consumed, uric acid production is negligible. When fructose consumption is excessive, uric acid levels can increase via an unregulated fructokinase pathway that consumes ATP and converts fructose into fructose-1-phosphate, leading to the degradation of AMP into uric acid. Other factors possibly contributing to increased risk of hyperuricemia include alcohol consumption, obesity, male sex, and aging.

== Genetic and physiological diversity ==
=== Primates ===
In hominids uric acid (actually hydrogen urate ion) is the final oxidation (breakdown) product of purine metabolism and is excreted in urine, whereas in most other mammals, the enzyme uricase further oxidizes uric acid to allantoin. The loss of uricase in higher primates parallels the similar loss of the ability to synthesize the soluble vitamin C (ascorbic acid), suggesting that urate may partially substitute for ascorbate in such species. Both uric acid and ascorbic acid are strong reducing agents (electron donors) and potent antioxidants. In humans, over half the antioxidant capacity of blood plasma comes from hydrogen urate ion.

Genetic studies of more primates have found that the loss of uricase activity did not happen at the same time as the loss of L-gulonolactone oxidase (GLUO) activity (vitamin C synthesis), with approximately 30 million years between the two events, suggesting that one did not immediately lead to another. More specifically, loss of uricase happened in hominids while loss of GLUO also affected monkeys. Instead, it was hypothesized that the increase in uric acid blood levels was beneficial to apes as it promotes the conversion of fructose to triglycerides, allowing them to store energy for longer. In 2025, it was confirmed that when human liver cells are made to produce an ancestral uricase via CRISPR, they do not produce more triglyceride when taking up fructose.

==== Humans ====
The normal concentration range of uric acid (or hydrogen urate ion) in human blood is 25 to 80 mg/L for men and 15 to 60 mg/L for women (but see below for slightly different values). An individual can have serum values as high as 96 mg/L and not have gout. In humans, about 70% of daily uric acid disposal occurs via the kidneys, and in 5–25% of humans, impaired renal (kidney) excretion leads to hyperuricemia. Normal excretion of uric acid in the urine is 270 to 360 mg per day (concentration of 270 to 360 mg/L if one litre of urine is produced per day – higher than the solubility of uric acid because it is in the form of dissolved acid urates), roughly 1% as much as the daily excretion of urea.

=== Dogs ===
The Dalmatian has a genetic defect in uric acid uptake by the liver and kidneys, resulting in decreased conversion to allantoin, so this breed excretes uric acid, and not allantoin, in the urine.

=== Birds, reptiles and desert-dwelling mammals ===
In birds and reptiles, and in some desert-dwelling mammals (such as the kangaroo rat), uric acid is also the end product of purine metabolism, but it is excreted in feces as a dry mass. This involves a complex metabolic pathway that is energetically costly in comparison to processing of other nitrogenous wastes such as urea (from the urea cycle) or ammonia, but has the advantages of reducing water loss and preventing dehydration.

=== Invertebrates ===
Platynereis dumerilii, a marine polychaete worm, uses uric acid as a sexual pheromone. The female of the species releases uric acid into the water during mating, which induces males to release sperm.

=== Bacteria ===
Uric acid metabolism is done in the human gut by ~1/5 of bacteria species that come from 4 of 6 major phyla. Such metabolism is anaerobic involving uncharacterized ammonia lyase, peptidase, carbamoyl transferase, and oxidoreductase enzymes. The result is that uric acid is converted into xanthine or lactate and the short chain fatty acids such as acetate and butyrate. Radioisotope studies suggest about 1/3 of uric acid is removed in healthy people in their gut with this being roughly 2/3 in those with kidney disease. In uricase-deficient mouse models, such bacteria compensate for the loss of uricase and keep the increase in urate levels in check. Removal of these bacteria turns the hyperuricemia severe in these mice, leading researchers to raise the possibility "that antibiotics targeting anaerobic bacteria, which would ablate gut bacteria, increase the risk for developing gout in humans".

== Genetics ==
Although foods such as meat and seafood can elevate serum urate levels, genetic variation is a much greater contributor to high serum urate. A proportion of people have mutations in the urate transport proteins responsible for the excretion of uric acid by the kidneys. Variants of a number of genes, linked to serum urate, have so far been identified: SLC2A9; ABCG2; SLC17A1; SLC22A11; SLC22A12; SLC16A9; GCKR; LRRC16A; and PDZK1. GLUT9, encoded by the SLC2A9 gene, is known to transport both uric acid and fructose.

Myogenic hyperuricemia, as a result of the purine nucleotide cycle running when ATP reservoirs in muscle cells are low, is a common pathophysiologic feature of glycogenoses, such as GSD-III, which is a metabolic myopathy impairing the ability of ATP (energy) production for muscle cells. In these metabolic myopathies, myogenic hyperuricemia is exercise-induced; inosine, hypoxanthine and uric acid increase in plasma after exercise and decrease over hours with rest. Excess AMP (adenosine monophosphate) is converted into uric acid.

AMP → IMP → Inosine → Hypoxanthine → Xanthine → Uric Acid

== Clinical significance and research ==
In human blood plasma, the reference range of uric acid is typically 3.4–7.2 mg per 100 mL (200–430 μmol/L) for men, and 2.4–6.1 mg per 100 mL for women (140–360 μmol/L). Uric acid concentrations in blood plasma above and below the normal range are known as, respectively, hyperuricemia and hypouricemia. Likewise, uric acid concentrations in urine above and below normal are known as hyperuricosuria and hypouricosuria. Uric acid levels in saliva may be associated with blood uric acid levels.

=== High uric acid ===
Hyperuricemia (high levels of uric acid), which induces gout, has various potential origins:

- Diet may be a factor. High intake of dietary purine, high-fructose corn syrup, and sucrose can increase levels of uric acid.
- Serum uric acid can be elevated by reduced excretion via the kidneys.
- Fasting or rapid weight loss can temporarily elevate uric acid levels.
- Certain drugs, such as thiazide diuretics, can increase blood uric acid levels by interfering with renal clearance.
- Tumor lysis syndrome, a metabolic complication of certain cancers or chemotherapy, due to nucleobase and potassium release into the plasma.
- Pseudohypoxia (disrupted NADH/NAD^{+} ratio) caused by diabetic hyperglycemia and excessive alcohol consumption.

==== Gout ====
A 2011 survey in the United States indicated that 3.9% of the population had gout, whereas 21.4% had hyperuricemia without having symptoms.

Excess blood uric acid (serum urate) can induce gout, a painful condition resulting from needle-like crystals of uric acid termed monosodium urate crystals precipitating in joints, capillaries, skin, and other tissues. Gout can occur where serum uric acid levels are as low as 6 mg per 100 mL (357 μmol/L), but an individual can have serum values as high as 9.6 mg per 100 mL (565 μmol/L) and not have gout.

In humans, purines are metabolized into uric acid, which is then excreted in the urine. Consumption of large amounts of some types of purine-rich foods, particularly meat and seafood, increases gout risk. Purine-rich foods include liver, kidney, and sweetbreads, and certain types of seafood, including anchovies, herring, sardines, mussels, scallops, trout, haddock, mackerel, and tuna. Moderate intake of purine-rich vegetables, however, is not associated with an increased risk of gout.

One treatment for gout in the 19th century was administration of lithium salts; lithium urate is more soluble. Today, inflammation during attacks is more commonly treated with NSAIDs, colchicine, or corticosteroids, and urate levels are managed with allopurinol. Allopurinol, which weakly inhibits xanthine oxidase, is an analog of hypoxanthine that is hydroxylated by xanthine oxidoreductase at the 2-position to give oxipurinol.

==== Tumor lysis syndrome ====
Tumor lysis syndrome, an emergency condition that may result from blood cancers, produces high uric acid levels in blood when tumor cells release their contents into the blood, either spontaneously or following chemotherapy. Tumor lysis syndrome may lead to acute kidney injury when uric acid crystals are deposited in the kidneys. Treatment includes hyperhydration to dilute and excrete uric acid via urine, rasburicase to reduce levels of poorly soluble uric acid in blood, or allopurinol to inhibit purine catabolism from adding to uric acid levels.

==== Lesch–Nyhan syndrome ====
Lesch–Nyhan syndrome, a rare inherited disorder, is also associated with high serum uric acid levels. Spasticity, involuntary movement, and cognitive retardation as well as manifestations of gout are seen in this syndrome.

==== Cardiovascular disease ====
Hyperuricemia is associated with an increase in risk factors for cardiovascular disease. It is also possible that high levels of uric acid may have a causal role in the development of atherosclerotic cardiovascular disease, but this is controversial and the data are conflicting.

==== Uric acid stone formation ====
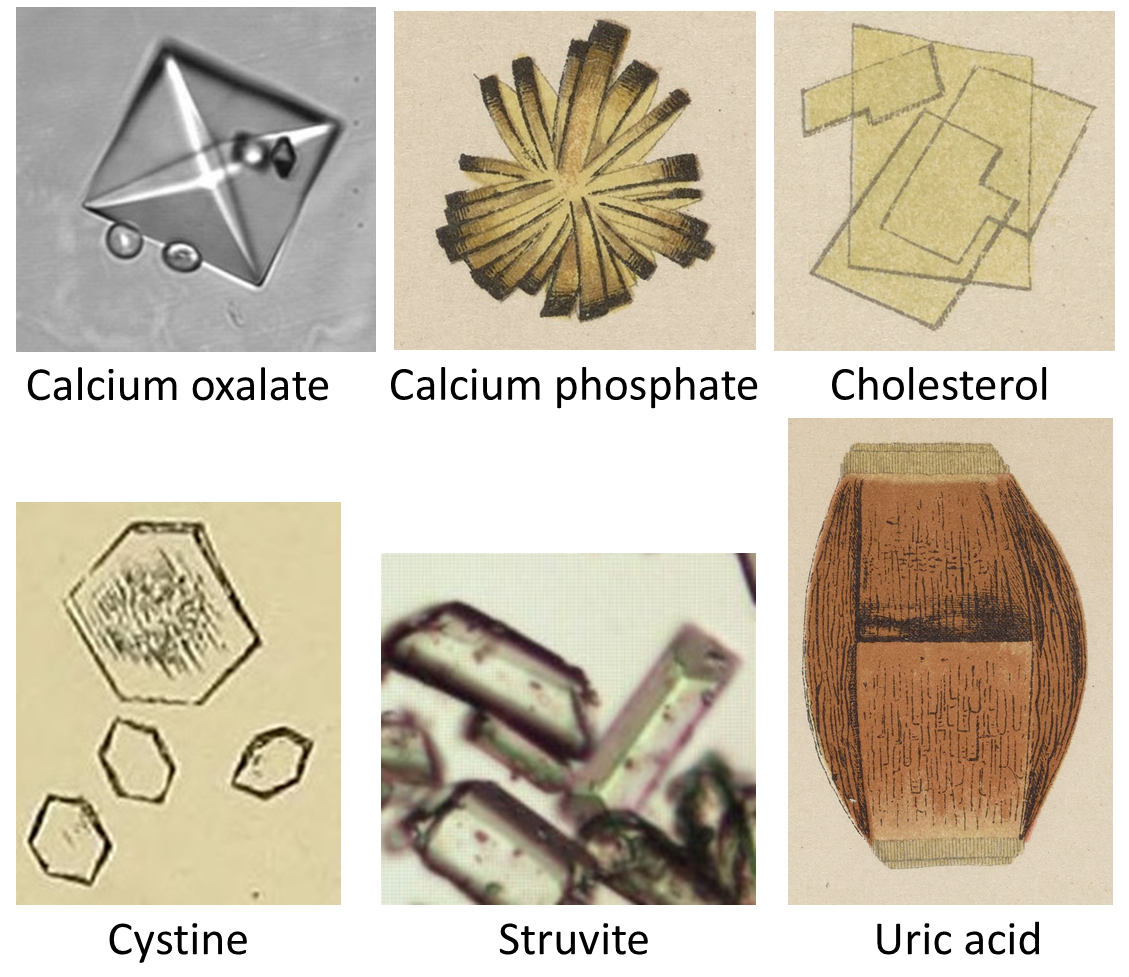
Comparison of different types of urinary crystals.

Kidney stones can form through deposits of sodium urate microcrystals.

Saturation levels of uric acid in blood may result in one form of kidney stones when the urate crystallizes in the kidney. These uric acid stones are radiolucent, so do not appear on an abdominal plain X-ray. Uric acid crystals can also promote the formation of calcium oxalate stones, acting as "seed crystals".

==== Diabetes ====
Hyperuricemia is associated with components of metabolic syndrome, including in children.

=== Low uric acid ===
Low uric acid (hypouricemia) can have numerous causes. Low dietary zinc intakes cause lower uric acid levels. This effect can be even more pronounced in women taking oral contraceptive medication. Sevelamer, a drug indicated for prevention of hyperphosphataemia in people with chronic kidney failure, can significantly reduce serum uric acid.

==== Multiple sclerosis ====
Meta-analysis of 10 case-control studies found that the serum uric acid levels of patients with multiple sclerosis were significantly lower compared to those of healthy controls, possibly indicating a diagnostic biomarker for multiple sclerosis.

==== Normalizing low uric acid ====
Correcting low or deficient zinc levels can help elevate serum uric acid.

== See also ==
- Theacrine or 1,3,7,9-tetramethyluric acid, a purine alkaloid found in some teas
- Uracil – purine nucleobase named by Robert Behrend who was attempting to synthesize derivatives of uric acid
- Metabolic myopathy
- Purine nucleotide cycle
