= Nephrocalcin =

Acidic glycoprotein

Nephrocalcin is an acidic glycoprotein, is produced by renal proximal tubule cells. It inhibits crystal nucleation, growth and aggregation. It is one of the key inhibitors for Nephrolithiasis, kidney stone disease.

There are at least 4 known isoforms of Nephrocalcin: NC-A, NC-B, NC-C, and NC-D. A higher secretion of NC-C and NC-D is found in kidney stone patients, whereas a higher secretion of NC-A and NC-B in non-patients.
