= Inborn errors of renal tubular transport =

- Specialty: Obstetrics and gynaecology, urology, medical genetics, endocrinology

Inborn errors of renal tubular transport are metabolic disorders which lead to impairment in the ability of solutes, such as salts or amino acids, to be transported across the brush border of the renal tubule. This results in disruptions of renal reabsorption.

Examples of these disorders include Iminoglycinuria, renal tubular acidosis and Gitelman syndrome.
