= Alkali citrate =

Compound used to prevent kidney stones

Alkali citrate (also known as alkaline citrate) is an inhibitor of kidney stones. It is used to increase urine citrate levels - this prevents calcium oxalate stones by binding to calcium and inhibiting its binding to oxalate. It is also used to increase urine pH (alkalinize urine) - this prevents uric acid stones and cystine stones (which form in cystinuria).

It is different from citric acid which is citrate bonded by hydrogen ions (or protons) making it acidic. Citric acid does not alkalinize urine as alkali citrate does. Alkali citrate replaces the protons with a non-acid positively charged ion like sodium, potassium or magnesium.

== Available forms ==
Alkaline citrate can be prescribed (K-citrate) or found as an over-the-counter (OTC) pill, liquid, or powder. For kidney stone prevention or alkalinization, it is most often accompanied by mineral(s) sodium or potassium. Less frequently, magnesium citrate may be included. This results in compounds like Trimagnesium citrate, Tripotassium citrate and Trisodium citrate:

- Potassium citrate: K_{3}C_{6}H_{5}O_{7} or C_{6}H_{5}K_{3}O_{7}
- Trisodium citrate: C_{6}H_{5}Na_{3}O_{7}
- Magnesium citrate: C_{12}H_{10}Mg_{3}O_{14}

Citrus based beverages like lemon juice and orange juice may raise urine citrate, but much of the citrate is citric acid; without a cation like sodium, potassium or magnesium these beverages will have less effect on urine chemistry and therefore not aid in prevention of kidney stones as alkali citrate will.

== Biological effects ==
Alkaline citrates are used to prevent recurrent calcium stone formation. This is one of the major types of kidney stones. The citrate salts can increase urine citrate, which binds with urine calcium, reduces supersaturation of calcium salts, and inhibits crystal formation. This helps prevent kidney stones.

Oral alkali supplementation can also slow the rate of kidney function decline and "potentially reduce the risk of end stage kidney disease (ESKD) in patients with chronic kidney disease (CKD) and metabolic acidosis."

The compound also raises urine pH. When citrate is metabolized by the liver, it essentially generates bicarbonate, an important buffer. This reduces uric acid supersaturation and prevents uric acid stones and cystine stones.
