= SLC6A18 =

Protein-coding gene in the species Homo sapiens

Identifiers
- Aliases: SLC6A18, Xtrp2, solute carrier family 6 member 18
- External IDs: OMIM: 610300; MGI: 1336892; GeneCards: SLC6A18

Gene location (Human)
Chr.	Chromosome 5 (human)
Band	5p15.33	Start	1,225,381 bp
Band	5p15.33	End	1,246,189 bp

Gene location (Mouse)
Chr.	Chromosome 13 (mouse)
Band	13 C1|13 40.13 cM	Start	73,809,871 bp
Band	13 C1|13 40.13 cM	End	73,826,142 bp
RNA expression pattern
Bgee	Human / Mouse (ortholog); Top expressed in: metanephros; renal cortex; sural nerve; intestinal epithelium; liver; small intestine; mucosa of small intestine; human kidney; hemolymphoid system; large intestine / Top expressed in: right kidney; proximal tubule; human kidney; inner stripe of outer renal medulla; proximal straight tubule; yolk sac; thin ascending limb of loop of Henle; proximal convoluted tubule; primary visual cortex; triceps brachii muscle; More reference expression data
BioGPS	n/a
Gene ontology
Molecular function	neurotransmitter:sodium symporter activity; symporter activity; transporter activity; amino acid transmembrane transporter activity; neutral amino acid transmembrane transporter activity
Cellular component	integral component of membrane; integral component of plasma membrane; membrane; brush border membrane; plasma membrane; apical plasma membrane
Biological process	amino acid transmembrane transport; neurotransmitter transport; amino acid transport; transmembrane transport; neutral amino acid transport
Sources:Amigo / QuickGO
Orthologs
Databases	NCBI: entry; OMA: entry
Species	Human	Mouse
Entrez	348932	22598
Ensembl	ENSG00000164363	ENSMUSG00000021612
UniProt	Q96N87	O88576
RefSeq (mRNA)	NM_182632	NM_001040692; NM_001136087; NM_001168643; NM_001168644; NM_001168645 NM_001168646; NM_011730
RefSeq (protein)	NP_872438	NP_001035782; NP_001129559; NP_001162114; NP_001162115; NP_001162116 NP_001162117
Location (UCSC)	Chr 5: 1.23 – 1.25 Mb	Chr 13: 73.81 – 73.83 Mb
PubMed search
- Wikidata
View/Edit Human	View/Edit Mouse

Solute carrier family 6, member 18 also known as SLC6A18 is a protein which in humans is encoded by the SLC6A18 gene.

== Function ==
The SLC6 family of proteins, which includes SLC6A18, acts as specific transporters for neurotransmitters, amino acids, and osmolytes like betaine, taurine, and creatine. SLC6 proteins are sodium cotransporters that derive the energy for solute transport from the electrochemical gradient for sodium ions.

== Clinical significance ==
Mutations in the SLC6A18 gene are associated with iminoglycinuria.
