= Proton-coupled amino acid transporter 2 =

Protein-coding gene in the species Homo sapiens

SLC36A2

Identifiers
- Aliases: SLC36A2, PAT2, TRAMD1, solute carrier family 36 member 2
- External IDs: OMIM: 608331; MGI: 1891430; GeneCards: SLC36A2

Gene location (Human)
Chr.	Chromosome 5 (human)
Band	5q33.1	Start	151,314,972 bp
Band	5q33.1	End	151,347,590 bp

Gene location (Mouse)
Chr.	Chromosome 11 (mouse)
Band	11|11 B1.3	Start	55,049,296 bp
Band	11|11 B1.3	End	55,075,903 bp
RNA expression pattern
Bgee	Human / Mouse (ortholog); Top expressed in: quadriceps femoris muscle; skeletal muscle tissue; gastrocnemius muscle; muscle of thigh; human kidney; tibial nerve; testicle; sural nerve; gonad; renal cortex / Top expressed in: brown adipose tissue; sciatic nerve; body of femur; subcutaneous adipose tissue; mammary gland; intercostal muscle; white adipose tissue; humerus; aorta; otolith organ; More reference expression data
BioGPS	n/a
Gene ontology
Molecular function	L-alanine transmembrane transporter activity; amino acid:proton symporter activity; L-proline transmembrane transporter activity; glycine transmembrane transporter activity; proton transmembrane transporter activity; amino acid transmembrane transporter activity
Cellular component	cytoplasm; integral component of membrane; plasma membrane; extracellular exosome; membrane; vacuolar membrane
Biological process	proline transmembrane transport; ion transport; amino acid transport; glycine transport; L-alanine transport; proline transport; proton transmembrane transport; transport; amino acid transmembrane transport
Sources:Amigo / QuickGO
Orthologs
Databases	NCBI: entry; OMA: entry
Species	Human	Mouse
Entrez	153201	246049
Ensembl	ENSG00000186335	ENSMUSG00000020264
UniProt	Q495M3	Q8BHK3
RefSeq (mRNA)	NM_181776	NM_153170
RefSeq (protein)	NP_861441	NP_694810
Location (UCSC)	Chr 5: 151.31 – 151.35 Mb	Chr 11: 55.05 – 55.08 Mb
PubMed search
- Wikidata
View/Edit Human	View/Edit Mouse

Proton-coupled amino acid transporter 2 is a protein which in humans is encoded by the SLC36A2 gene.

== Function ==
SLC36A2 transports small amino acids (glycine, alanine, and proline) and also the D-enantiomers and select amino acid derivatives, such as gamma-aminobutyric acid.

== Clinical significance ==
Mutations in the SLC36A2 gene are associated with Iminoglycinuria.

== See also ==
- Proton coupled amino acid transporter
