= Proton coupled amino acid transporter =

Type of protein receptors

Proton-coupled amino acid transporters belong to the SLC26A5 family; they are protein receptors whose main function is the transmembrane movement of amino acids and their derivatives. This family of receptors is most commonly found within the luminal surface of the small intestine as well as in some lysosomes. The solute carrier family (SLC) of genes includes roughly 400 membrane proteins that are characterized by 66 families in total. The SLC36 family of genes maps to chromosome 11. The diversity of these receptors is vast, with the ability to transport both charged and uncharged amino acids along with their derivatives. In research and practice, SLC36A1/2 are both targets for drug-based delivery systems for a wide range of disorders.

== Structure ==
The human protein acid transporter (hPAT1) is 5585 base pairs long and codes for a protein 476 amino acids long. The transporter has nine transmembrane regions where the amino terminus faces the cytoplasm. The rat protein acid transporter (rPAT1) has been widely studied and an 85% amino acid sequence match was found between hPAT1 and rPAT1. The hPAT1 gene is located on chromosome 5q31-33 and has 11 exons that are coding regions. Its translation site begins in exon 2 and exon 11 contains the termination site.

== Proton-coupled amino acid transporters 1 and 2 ==
The molecular weight of Proton-coupled amino acid transporter 1 is 53.28 kDA; the molecular weight of Proton-coupled amino acid transporter 2 is 53.22 kDA. PAT1 has been found in lysosomes in brain neurons but also in the apical membrane of intestinal epithelial cells where it is associated with the brush border. Proton-coupled amino acid transporter 1 has a higher affinity for proline than it does for glycine and alanine Proton-coupled amino acid transporter 2 is found subcellularly in the kidneys, lungs, spinal cord, and brain and likely has a role in myelinating neurons. It has an overall higher affinity for glycine, alanine, and proline than PAT1 but is more specific for what can inhibit it.

== Biochemistry ==
Unlike most amino acid transporters in the exchange of Na+ with amino acid symporters, proton-coupled amino acid transporters function as H+ with amino acid symporters. They are located within the luminal surface of the small intestine and within lysosomes, so their action functions in absorption in the intestine and in the efflux pathway after intralysosomal digestion. Unlike typical mammalian amino acid transporters which function in exchanging Na+/amino acid symporters, these- transporters function in exchanging H+/amino acid symporters. The activity of transporters, such as Proton-coupled amino acid transporter 1 and Proton-coupled amino acid transporter 2 can be measured at the apical membrane of the human epithelial layer of cells which are loaded with pH sensitive dyes. The change in membrane potential can be measured by the absorption of pH sensitive dyes and the associated influx of H+ ions. The proteins involved in these transporters are consider anion exchangers

== Function ==
The function of proton-coupled amino acid transporters is the transmembrane movement of amino acids and their derivatives for absorption by the luminal surface of the small intestine or digestion by intralysosomal proteins. In Drosophila models, the expression of SLC family genes that code for proton-coupled amino acid transporters is directly linked to the nutrient-dependent growth. In humans, similar expression patterns are observed and their function correlates to their location anatomically. Being located within the lamina of the small intestine allows for functional absorption of transported amino acids and derivatives. The majority of nutrient absorption takes place within this region of the intestines, and makes sense that these transporters are located throughout this tissue.

== Non-functional proton coupled amino acid transporter ==
In hereditary disease iminoglycinuria, there is a defect in the human proton-coupled amino acid transporter 1 and 2 genes which results in a defect in the absorption of proline and glycine. Iminoglycinuria is an autosomal recessive disorder of the renal tubular. Lack of glycine and proline absorption leads to excess urinary excretions containing amino acids. If the transporters are not working properly, a drug that they usually help gain entry in to the cell might not be absorbed Their function can also be inhibited by tryptophan derivatives and allow for exploration into the function of hPAT1 and hPAT2. Additionally, mutations that lead to structural changes in amino acid binding sites play a role in their functional transport.

== Biosynthesis ==
The DNA sequence of these transporters is transcribed in the nucleus of the cell by RNA polymerase and undergoes splicing and capping before it travels to the cytoplasm. In the cytoplasm, translation begins via a sequence in exon 2 of the mRNA. Subsequently, protein folding and packaging insert the transporter into the membrane. The protein has a signal recognition particle that is recognized as it leaves the ribosome. N-glycosylation at various sites on hPAT1 is necessary for its transport function. Three of its extracellular residues are glycosylated and determine transport efficacy.

== Clinical significance ==
PAT1 mRNA is expressed in the GI tract between the stomach and descending colon, but is generally absent in the esophagus, caecum, and rectum. This allows for different treatments that affect the affinity of the carrier protein for its substrates, giving the potential to treat various amino-acid related diseases. HPAT1 and HPAT2 are important in the absorption of certain drugs, especially pharmaceutically active amino acids derivatives. They have also been targeted with medications used as anticonvulsants, for prostate cancer, and for bladder cancer. HPAT1 and 2 are integral to the central nervous system because they transport GABA and its analogues which can induce and inhibitory and excitatory effect in the brain.
