= SLC6A20 =

Protein-coding amino acid transporter gene in the species Homo sapiens

Identifiers
- Aliases: SLC6A20, SIT1, XT3, Xtrp3, solute carrier family 6 member 20, IMINO
- External IDs: OMIM: 605616; MGI: 2143217; GeneCards: SLC6A20

Gene location (Human)
Chr.	Chromosome 3 (human)
Band	3p21.31	Start	45,755,449 bp
Band	3p21.31	End	45,796,536 bp

Gene location (Mouse)
Chr.	Chromosome 9 (mouse)
Band	9 F4|9 74.26 cM	Start	123,463,835 bp
Band	9 F4|9 74.26 cM	End	123,507,950 bp
RNA expression pattern
Bgee	Human / Mouse (ortholog); Top expressed in: retinal pigment epithelium; Epithelium of choroid plexus; duodenum; jejunal mucosa; gallbladder; mucosa of ileum; gonad; palpebral conjunctiva; pancreatic epithelial cell; tibial nerve / Top expressed in: retinal pigment epithelium; optic nerve; Epithelium of choroid plexus; epithelium of small intestine; duodenum; jejunum; median eminence; intestinal villus; mammillary body; ileum; More reference expression data
BioGPS	n/a
Gene ontology
Molecular function	neurotransmitter:sodium symporter activity; protein binding; symporter activity; amino acid transmembrane transporter activity; L-proline transmembrane transporter activity
Cellular component	integral component of membrane; plasma membrane; integral component of plasma membrane; apical plasma membrane; membrane; brush border membrane
Biological process	neurotransmitter transport; amino acid transport; glycine transport; proline transport; amino acid transmembrane transport; transmembrane transport; proline transmembrane transport
Sources:Amigo / QuickGO
Orthologs
Databases	NCBI: entry; OMA: entry
Species	Human	Mouse
Entrez	54716	102680
Ensembl	ENSG00000163817	ENSMUSG00000036814
UniProt	Q9NP91	Q8VDB9
RefSeq (mRNA)	NM_020208; NM_022405; NM_001385683	NM_139142
RefSeq (protein)	NP_064593; NP_071800	NP_631881
Location (UCSC)	Chr 3: 45.76 – 45.8 Mb	Chr 9: 123.46 – 123.51 Mb
PubMed search
- Wikidata
View/Edit Human	View/Edit Mouse

Solute carrier family 6, member 20 also known as SLC6A20 is a gene that encodes for the Sodium/imino-acid transporter 1 (SIT1) protein, a plasma membrane proline and glycine transporter.

== Function ==
The Sodium/imino-acid transporter 1 (SIT1) protein is a member of the solute carrier superfamily of transport proteins. SIT1 is a Na^{+} and Cl^{−} coupled symporter, like other SLC6 amino acid and amine transporters, and a homolog of the Bacterial Leucine Transporter.

Among the SLC6 transporters, only SIT1 and SLC6A7 (PROT) prefer secondary amino acids. This selectivity arises due to the shape and highly conserved residues of the protein's binding site to exclude residues with extended site chains.

Natively, SIT1 forms a complex with ACE2 or collectrin, which assists in trafficking the transporter to the plasma membrane.

== Clinical significance ==
Mutation in the SLC6A20 gene are associated with iminoglycinuria.

One of a cluster of 6 genes (SLC6A20, LZTFL1, CCR9, FYCO1, CXCR6 and XCR1) on chromosome 3 at location 3p21.31 associated with a genetic susceptibility to COVID-19 respiratory failure. Of these, SIT1 expression can control ACE2 trafficking to the plasma membrane and thereby SLC6A20 gene variants are proposed to alter the availability of viral receptors on the cell surface.

SIT1 is proposed to modulate the activity of glycine and NMDA receptors, and variants in the SLC6A20 gene are associated with Hirschprung's disease.

SIT1 is also the primary proline transporter in the retinal pigment epithelium and supports the proline-dependent metabolism of these cells. Consequently, SLC6A20 gene variants are associated with retinal thickness and the retinal diseases Age-Related Macular Degeneration and Macular telangiectasia.
