= Proton-coupled amino acid transporter 1 =

Protein-coding gene in the species Homo sapiens

SLC36A1

Identifiers
- Aliases: SLC36A1, Dct1, LYAAT1, PAT1, TRAMD3, solute carrier family 36 member 1
- External IDs: OMIM: 606561; MGI: 2445299; GeneCards: SLC36A1

Gene location (Human)
Chr.	Chromosome 5 (human)
Band	5q33.1	Start	151,437,046 bp
Band	5q33.1	End	151,492,379 bp

Gene location (Mouse)
Chr.	Chromosome 11 (mouse)
Band	11|11 B1.3	Start	55,095,176 bp
Band	11|11 B1.3	End	55,127,156 bp
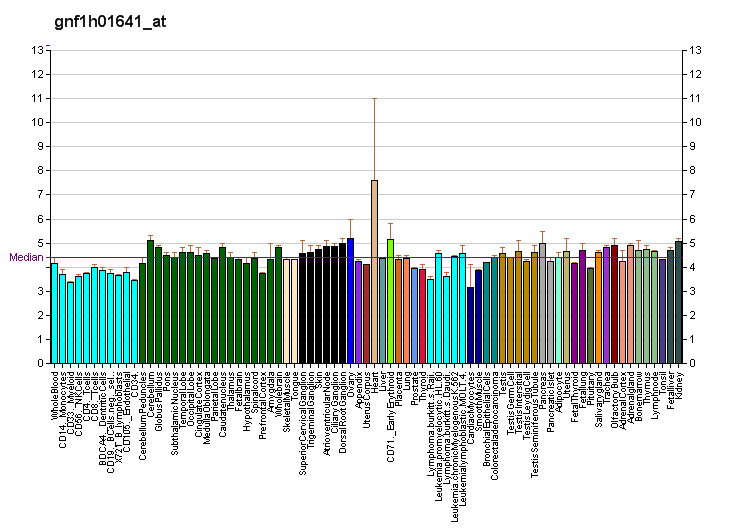

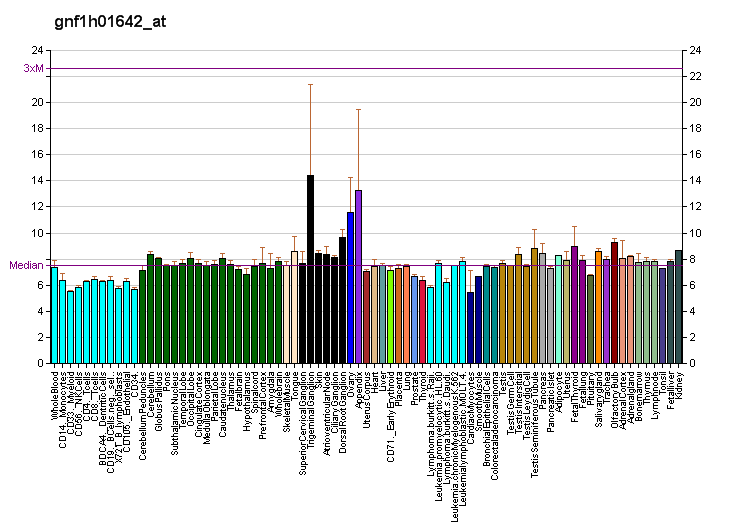

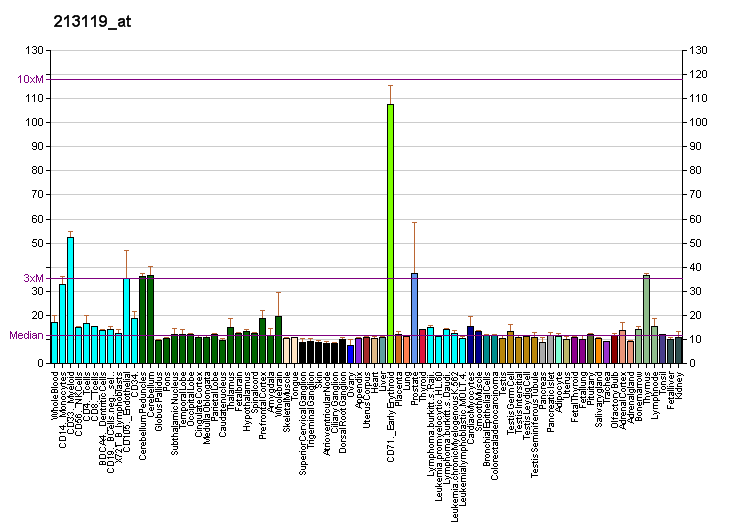
RNA expression pattern
Bgee	Human / Mouse (ortholog); Top expressed in: jejunal mucosa; duodenum; right hemisphere of cerebellum; mucosa of ileum; trabecular bone; trigeminal ganglion; mucosa of colon; rectum; tendon of biceps brachii; mucosa of sigmoid colon / Top expressed in: superior cervical ganglion; spinal ganglia; lumbar spinal ganglion; visual cortex; left colon; jejunum; stroma of bone marrow; yolk sac; primary visual cortex; islet of Langerhans; More reference expression data
BioGPS	More reference expression data
Gene ontology
Molecular function	amino acid:proton symporter activity; L-proline transmembrane transporter activity; neutral amino acid transmembrane transporter activity; proton transmembrane transporter activity; L-alanine transmembrane transporter activity; glycine transmembrane transporter activity; symporter activity; amino acid transmembrane transporter activity
Cellular component	integral component of membrane; membrane; plasma membrane; lysosomal membrane; endoplasmic reticulum; lysosome
Biological process	L-alanine transport; proton transmembrane transport; proline transmembrane transport; ion transport; proline transport; amino acid transport; glycine transport; neutral amino acid transport; transmembrane transport; amino acid transmembrane transport; transport
Sources:Amigo / QuickGO
Orthologs
Databases	NCBI: entry; OMA: entry
Species	Human	Mouse
Entrez	206358	215335
Ensembl	ENSG00000123643	ENSMUSG00000020261
UniProt	Q7Z2H8	Q8K4D3
RefSeq (mRNA)	NM_001308150; NM_001308151; NM_078483; NM_001349740	NM_153139
RefSeq (protein)	NP_001295079; NP_001295080; NP_510968; NP_001336669	NP_694779
Location (UCSC)	Chr 5: 151.44 – 151.49 Mb	Chr 11: 55.1 – 55.13 Mb
PubMed search
- Wikidata
View/Edit Human	View/Edit Mouse

Proton-coupled amino acid transporter 1 is a protein that in humans is encoded by the SLC36A1 gene.

This gene encodes a member of the eukaryote-specific amino acid/auxin permease (AAAP) 1 transporter family. The encoded protein functions as a proton-dependent, small amino acid transporter. This gene is clustered with related family members on chromosome 5q33.1.

== See also ==
- Solute carrier family
- Proton coupled amino acid transporter
