= Blasticidin =

Blasticidin may refer to:

- Blasticidin A
- Blasticidin S

== See also ==
- Blasticidin-S deaminase
