= Metabolic gene cluster =

Metabolic gene clusters or biosynthetic gene clusters (BGC) are tightly linked sets of mostly non-homologous genes participating in a common, discrete metabolic pathway. The genes are in physical vicinity to each other on the genome, and their expression is often coregulated. Metabolic gene clusters are common features of bacterial, most fungal, and plant genomes (although there is contradicting evidence on plant organisms). They are most widely known for producing secondary metabolites, the source or basis of most pharmaceutical compounds, natural toxins, chemical communication, and chemical warfare between organisms. Metabolic gene clusters are also involved in nutrient acquisition, toxin degradation, antimicrobial resistance, and vitamin biosynthesis. Given all these properties of metabolic gene clusters, they play a key role in shaping microbial ecosystems, including microbiome-host interactions. Thus several computational genomics tools have been developed to predict metabolic gene clusters.

== Motivating examples ==
Nutrient acquisition (transport and degredation):

- lac operon and gal operon

Cofactor/vitamin biosynthesis: (Note: A vitamin is, technically speaking, a cofactor or other kind of material necessary for life that can only be acquired from the surroundings. When an organism can synthesize a cofactor to the point that it can be independent of outside input of this molecule, this cofactor stops being a vitamin for it.)

- Pyrroloquinoline quinone biosynthesis operon (pqqABCDE) in bacteria; analogous operon for mycofactocin.

Secondary metabolite production:

- PsiD/M/H/K/T for psilocybin biosynthesis, which has also seen horizontal gene transfer.
- Various nonribosomal peptide synthase (NRPS) and polyketide synthase (PKS) clusters, such as those for ciclosporin and microcystins.

== Evolution ==
The origin and evolution of metabolic gene clusters have been debated since the 1990s. It has since been demonstrated that metabolic gene clusters can arise in a genome by genome rearrangement, gene duplication, or horizontal gene transfer, and some metabolic clusters have evolved convergently in multiple species. Horizontal gene cluster transfer has been linked to ecological niches in which the encoded pathways are thought to provide a benefit. It has been argued that clustering of genes for ecological functions results from reproductive trends among organisms, and goes on to contribute to accelerated adaptation by increasing refinement of complex functions in the pangenome of a population.

== Bioinformatic tools ==
=== Tools based on rules ===
Bioinformatic tools have been developed to predict, and determine the abundance and expression of, this kind of gene cluster in microbiome samples, from metagenomic data. Since the size of metagenomic data is considerable, filtering and clusterization thereof are important parts of these tools. These processes can consist of dimensionality -reduction techniques, such as Minhash, and clusterization algorithms such as k-medoids and affinity propagation. Also several metrics and similarities have been developed to compare them.

Genome mining for biosynthetic gene clusters (BGCs) has become an integral part of natural product discovery. The >200,000 microbial genomes now publicly available hold information on abundant novel chemistry. One way to navigate this vast genomic diversity is through comparative analysis of homologous BGCs, which allows identification of cross-species patterns that can be matched to the presence of metabolites or biological activities. However, current tools are hindered by a bottleneck caused by the expensive network-based approach used to group these BGCs into gene cluster families (GCFs).

==== Identification ====
AntiSMASH is a framework for detecting BGCs. It uses profile hidden Markov models (HMM) to identify protein families corresponding to biosynthetic functions or smaller amino-acid patterns for motifs too short for HMM. Manually-curated rules then describe how specific types of BGCs can be inferred by co-occurrence of certain families/motifs. It features advanced detection and annotation for NRPS and PKS clusters.

PRISM uses a mixture of HMM, motifs, BLAST, and machine learning to identify protein domains involved in biosynthetic functions. Clusters are identified in a rule-based approach. Each cluster is then examined to predict the structure of their products in a combinatorial, graph-based fashion.

==== Clustering ====
BiG-SLiCE (Biosynthetic Genes Super-Linear Clustering Engine), a tool designed to cluster massive numbers of BGCs. By representing them in Euclidean space, BiG-SLiCE can group BGCs into GCFs in a non-pairwise, near-linear fashion. Satria et al., 2021 across BiG-SLiCE demonstrate the utility of such analyses by reconstructing a global map of secondary metabolic diversity across taxonomy to identify uncharted biosynthetic potential, opens up new possibilities to accelerate natural product discovery and offers a first step towards constructing a global and searchable interconnected network of BGCs. As more genomes are sequenced from understudied taxa, more information can be mined to highlight their potentially novel chemistry.

== Databases ==
Minimum Information about a Biosynthetic Gene cluster (MIBiG)
MIBiG is a data standard that describes the minimum amount of information a researcher should provide about a newly-discovered BiG as well as a database that records BiGs according to this standard. MIBiG is regularly updated by a group of curators. As of September 2026, the latest revision is MIBiG 4.0 of January 2025.
AntiSMASH database
Pre-calculated antiSMASH results.
BiG-FAM
BiG-FAM is also known as the Biosynthetic Gene Cluster Family (GCF) database. It combines the BGCs from MIBiG and the results of running antiSMASH on available genomes. These genomes are then clustered with BiG-SLiCE. As of 2021 it includes 1,225,071 BGCs from 209,206 genomes (21,678 species) organized into 29,955 families.
