= (Formate-C-acetyltransferase)-activating enzyme =

Class of enzymes

[formate-C-acetyltransferase]-activating enzyme

Identifiers
- EC no.: 1.97.1.4
- CAS no.: 206367-15-9

Databases
- IntEnz: IntEnz view
- BRENDA: BRENDA entry
- ExPASy: NiceZyme view
- KEGG: KEGG entry
- MetaCyc: metabolic pathway
- PRIAM: profile
- PDB structures: RCSB PDB PDBe PDBsum
- Gene Ontology: AmiGO / QuickGO
Search
- PMC: articles
- PubMed: articles
- NCBI: proteins

In enzymology, a [formate-C-acetyltransferase]-activating enzyme (EC 1.97.1.4) is an enzyme that catalyzes the chemical reaction

S-adenosyl-L-methionine + dihydroflavodoxin + [formate C-acetyltransferase]-glycine $\rightleftharpoons$ 5'-deoxyadenosine + L-methionine + flavodoxin semiquinone + [formate C-acetyltransferase]-glycin-2-yl radical

The 3 substrates of this enzyme are S-adenosyl-L-methionine, dihydroflavodoxin, and formate C-acetyltransferase-glycine, whereas its 4 products are 5'-deoxyadenosine, L-methionine, flavodoxin semiquinone, and formate C-acetyltransferase-glycin-2-yl radical.

This radical SAM enzyme belongs to the family of oxidoreductases. The systematic name of this enzyme class is [formate C-acetyltransferase]-glycine dihydroflavodoxin:S-adenosyl-L-methionine oxidoreductase (S-adenosyl-L-methionine cleaving). Other names in common use include PFL activase, PFL-glycine:S-adenosyl-L-methionine H transferase (flavodoxin-oxidizing, S-adenosyl-L-methionine-cleaving), formate acetyltransferase activating enzyme, formate acetyltransferase-glycine dihydroflavodoxin:S-adenosyl-L-methionine oxidoreductase (S-adenosyl-L-methionine cleaving).
