= Radical SAM enzymes =

Identifiers
- Symbol: Radical SAM
- Pfam: PF04055
- InterPro: IPR007197
- SCOP2: 102114 / SCOPe / SUPFAM
Available protein structures:
- PDB: IPR007197 PF04055 (ECOD; PDBsum)
- AlphaFold: IPR007197; PF04055

Radical SAM enzymes belong to a superfamily of enzymes that use an iron-sulfur cluster (4Fe-4S) to reductively cleave S-adenosyl-L-methionine (SAM) to generate a radical, usually a 5′-deoxyadenosyl radical (5'-dAdo), as a critical intermediate. These enzymes utilize this radical intermediate to perform diverse transformations, often to functionalize unactivated C-H bonds. Radical SAM enzymes are involved in cofactor biosynthesis, enzyme activation, peptide modification, post-transcriptional and post-translational modifications, metalloprotein cluster formation, tRNA modification, lipid metabolism, biosynthesis of antibiotics and natural products etc. The vast majority of known radical SAM enzymes belong to the radical SAM superfamily, and have a cysteine-rich motif that matches or resembles CxxxCxxC. Radical SAM enzymes comprise the largest superfamily of metal-containing enzymes.

== History and mechanism ==
As of 2001, 645 unique radical SAM enzymes have been identified from 126 species in all three domains of life. According to the EFI and SFLD databases, more than 220,000 radical SAM enzymes are predicted to be involved in 85 types of biochemical transformations.

The mechanism for these reactions entail transfer of a methyl or adenosyl group from sulfur to iron. The resulting organoiron complex subsequently releases the organic radical. The latter step is reminiscent of the behavior of adenosyl and methyl cobalamins.

== Nomenclature ==
All enzymes including radical SAM enzymes follow an easy guideline for systematic naming. Systematic naming of enzymes allows a uniform naming process that is recognized by all scientists to understand corresponding function. The first word of the enzyme name often shows the substrate of the enzyme. The position of the reaction on the substrate will also be in the beginning portion of the name. Lastly, the class of the enzyme will be described in the other half of the name which will end in suffix -ase. The class of an enzyme will describe what the enzyme is doing or changing on the substrate. For example, a ligase combines two molecules to form a new bond.

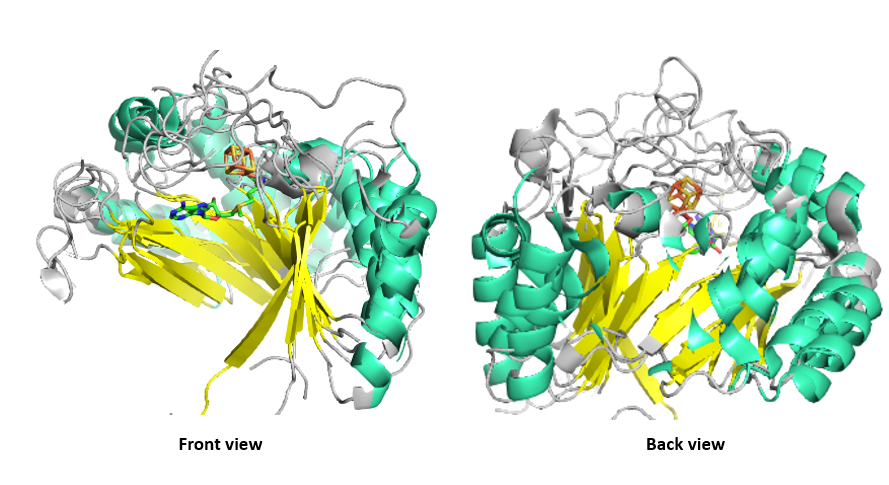
Superimposition of three radical SAM core domains. Side views of radical SAM enzymes BioB (PDB: 1R30), MoaA (PDB: 1TV8) and phTYW1 (PDB: 2YX0) are shown front and back. This core fold consists of six β/α motifs arranged in a manner that is similar to TIM barrel and is responsible for radical generation. β-sheets are colored yellow and α-helices are shown in cyan.

== Reaction classification ==
Representative enzymes will be mentioned for each class. Radical SAM enzymes and their mechanisms known before 2008 are summarized by Frey et al. Since 2015, additional review articles on radical SAM enzymes are available, including:

1. Advances in Radical SAM Enzymology: New Structures and Mechanisms:
2. Radical S-Adenosylmethionine Enzymes:
3. Radical S-Adenosylmethionine (SAM) Enzymes in Cofactor Biosynthesis: A Treasure Trove of Complex Organic Radical Rearrangement Reactions:
4. Molecular architectures and functions of radical enzymes and their (re)activating proteins:
5. Radical SAM enzymes in RiPP biosynthesis.
6. Radical SAM enzymes with a vitamin B_{12} (cobalamin)-binding domain.

=== Carbon methylation ===
Radical SAM methylases/methyltransferases are one of the largest yet diverse subgroups and are capable of methylating a broad range of unreactive carbon and phosphorus centers. These enzymes are divided into three classes (Class A, B and C) with representative methylation mechanisms. The shared characteristic is the usage of SAM, split into two distinct roles: one as a source of a methyl group donor, and the second as a source of 5'-dAdo radical. Another class has been proposed (class D) but proved to be wrongly assigned.

==== Class A sub-family ====
- Class A enzymes methylate specific adenosine residues on rRNA and/or tRNA. In other words, they are RNA base-modifying radical SAM enzymes.
- The most mechanistically well-characterized are enzymes RlmN and Cfr. Both enzymes methylates substrate by adding a methylene fragment originating from SAM molecule. Therefore, RlmN and Cfr are considered methyl synthases instead of methyltransferases.

Structure of a B_{12}-dependent radical SAM enzyme (PDB:7QBS)

==== Class B sub-family ====
- Class B enzymes are the largest and most versatile which can methylate a wide range of carbon and phosphorus centers.
- These enzymes require a cobalamin (vitamin B12) cofactor as an intermediate methyl group carrier to transfer a methyl group from SAM to substrate.
- One well-investigated representative enzyme is TsrM which involves in tryptophan methylation in thiostrepton biosynthesis.

==== Class C sub-family ====
- Class C enzymes are reported to play roles in biosynthesis of complex natural products and secondary metabolites. These enzymes methylate heteroaromatic substrates and are cobalamin-independent.
- These enzymes contain both the radical SAM motif and exhibit striking sequence similarity to coproporhyrinogen III oxidase (HemN), a radical SAM enzyme involved in heme biosynthesis
- Detailed mechanistic investigations on two class C radical SAM methylases have been reported:
  1. TbtI is involved in the biosynthesis of potent thiopeptide antibiotic thiomuracin.
  2. Jaw5 is suggested to be responsible for cyclopropane modifications.

=== Methylthiolation of tRNAs ===
Methylthiotransferases belong to a subset of radical SAM enzymes that contain two [4Fe-4S]^{+} clusters and one radical SAM domain. Methylthiotransferases play a major role in catalyzing methylthiolation on tRNA nucleotides or anticodons through a redox mechanism. Thiolation modification is believed to maintain translational efficiency and fidelity.

MiaB and RimO are both well-characterized and bacterial prototypes for tRNA-modifying methylthiotransferases

- MiaB introduces a methylthio group to the isopentenylated A37 derivatives in the tRNA of S. Typhimurium and E. coli by utilizing one SAM molecule to generate 5'-dAdo radical to activate the substrate and a second SAM to donate a sulfur atom to the substrate.
- RimO is responsible for post-translational modification of Asp88 of the ribosomal protein S12 in E. coli. The crystal structure sheds light on the mechanistic action of RimO. The enzyme catalyzes pentasulfide bridge formation linking two Fe-S clusters to allow for sulfur insertion to the substrate.

eMtaB is the designated methylthiotransferase in eukaryotic and archaeal cells. eMtaB catalyzes the methylthiolation of tRNA at position 37 on N6-threonylcarbamoyladenosine. A bacterial homologue of eMtaB, YqeV has been reported and suggested to function similarly to MiaB and RimO.

=== Sulfur insertion into unreactive C-H bonds ===
Sulfurtransferases are a small subset of radical SAM enzymes. Two well-known examples are BioB and LipA which are independently responsible for biotin synthesis and lipoic acid metabolism, respectively.

- BioB or biotin synthase is a radical SAM enzyme that employs one [4Fe-4S] center to thiolate dethiobitin, thus converting it to biotin or also known as vitamin B7. Vitamin B7 is a cofactor used in carboxylation, decarboxylation, and transcarboxylation reactions in many organisms.
- LipA or lipoyl synthase is radical SAM sulfurtransferase utilizing two [4Fe-4S] clusters to catalyze the final step in lipoic acid biosynthesis.

=== Carbon insertion ===
The active site of Mo nitrogenase is the M-cluster, a metal-sulfur cluster containing a carbide at its core. Within the biosynthesis of M-cluster, radical SAM enzyme NifB has been recognized to catalyze a carbon insertion reaction, leading to formation of a Mo/homocitrate-free precursor of M-cluster.

=== Anaerobic oxidative decarboxylation ===
- One well-studied example is HemN. HemN or anaerobic coproporphyrinogen III oxidase is a radical SAM enzyme that catalyzes the oxidative decarboxylation of coproporphyrinogen III to protoporphyrinogen IX, an intermediate in heme biosynthesis. Evidence support the idea that HemN utilizes two SAM molecules to mediate radical-mediated hydrogen transfer for the sequential decarboxylation of the two propionate groups of coproporphyrinogen III.
- Hyperthermophilic sulfate-reducing archaen Archaeoglobus fulgidus enables anaerobic oxidation of long chain n-alkanes. PflD is reported to be responsible for the capacity of A. fulgidus to grow on a wide range of unsaturated carbons and fatty acids. A detailed biochemical and mechanistic characterization of PflD is still undergoing but preliminary data suggest PflD may be a radical SAM enzyme.

=== Protein post-translational modification ===
- Formyl-glycine dependent sulfatases require the critical post-translational modification of an active site cysteine or serine residue into a Cα-formylglycine. A radical SAM enzyme called anSME catalyze this post-translational modification in an oxygen-independent manner.

=== Protein radical formation ===
Glycyl radical enzyme activating enzymes (GRE-AEs) are radical SAM subset that can house a stable and catalytically essential glycyl radical in their active state. The underlying chemistry is considered to be the simplest in the radical SAM superfamily with H-atom abstraction by the 5'-dAdo radical being the product of the reaction. A few examples include:

- Pyruvate formate-lyase activating enzyme (PFL-AE) catalyzes the activation of PFL, a central enzyme in anaerobic glucose metabolism in microbes.
- Benzylsuccinate synthase (BSS) is a central enzyme in anaerobic toluene catabolism.

=== Peptide modifications ===
Radical SAM enzymes that can catalyze sulfur-to-alpha carbon thioether cross-linked peptides (sactipeptides) generate a class of peptide with antibacterial properties. These peptides belong to the emerging class of ribosomally synthesized and post-translationally modified peptides (RiPPs).

Another subset of peptide-modifying radical SAM enzymes is SPASM/Twitch domain-carrying enzymes. SPASM/Twitch enzymes carry a functionalized C-terminal extension for the binding of two [4Fe-4S] clusters, especially in post-translational modifications of peptides.

The following examples are representative enzymes that can catalyze peptide modifications to generate specific natural products or cofactors.

1. TsrM in thiostrepton biosynthesis
2. PoyD and PoyC in polytheonamide biosynthesis
3. TbtI in thiomuracin biosynthesis
4. NosN in nosiheptide biosynthesis
5. EpeE (previously called YydG) in epipeptide biosynthesis
6. MoaA in molybdopterin biosynthesis
7. PqqE in pyrroloquinoline quinone biosynthesis
8. TunB in tunicamycin biosynthesis
9. OxsB in oxetanocin biosynthesis
10. BchE in anaerobic bacteriochlorophyll biosynthesis
11. F0 synthases in F420 cofactor biosynthesis
12. MqnE and MqnC in menaquinone biosynthesis
13. QhpD in post-translational processing of quinohemoprotein amine dehydrogenase
14. RumMC2 in ruminococcin C biosynthesis

=== Epimerization ===
Radical SAM epimerases are responsible for the regioselective introduction of D-amino acids into RiPPs. Two well-known enzymes have been thoroughly described in RiPP biosynthetic pathways. Radical SAM peptide epimerases use a critical cysteine residue to provide back an H-atom to the epimerized residue in addition to unique features for RiPP interaction.

Two well-known enzymes have been thoroughly described in RiPP biosynthetic pathways.

- PoyD installs numerous D-stereocenters in enzyme PoyA to ultimately help facilitate polytheonamide biosynthesis. Polytheoamide is a natural potent cytoxic agent by forming pores in membranes. This peptide cytotoxin is naturally produced by uncultivated bacteria that exist as symbionts in a marine sponge.
- YydG (EpeE) epimerase modifies two amino acid positions on YydF in Gram-positive Bacillus subtilis. Extrinsically added YydF mediates subsequent dissipation of membrane potential via membrane permeabilization, resulting in death of the organism. The structure of this enzyme also proved to be unique among RiPP-modifying enzymes.

=== Complex carbon skeleton rearrangements ===
Another subset of radical SAM superfamily has been shown to catalyze carbon skeleton rearrangements especially in the areas of DNA repair and cofactor biosynthesis.

- DNA spore photoproduct lysase (SPL) is a radical SAM that can repair DNA thymine dimers (spore product, SP) caused by UV radiation. Despite the remaining unknowns and controversies involving SPL-catalyzed reaction, it is certain that SPL utilizes SAM as a cofactor to generate 5'-dAdo radical to revert SP to two thymine residues.
- HydG is a radical SAM responsible for generating CO and CN^{−} ligands in the [Fe-Fe]-hydrogenase (HydA) in various anaerobic bacteria.
- Radical SAM MoaA and MoaC are involved in converting GTP into cyclic pyranopterin monophosphate (cPMP). Overall, both play roles in molybdopterin biosynthesis.

=== Other reactions ===
- A radical SAM enzyme with intrinsic lyase activity is able to catalyze lysine transfer reaction, generating archaea-specific archaosine-containing tRNAs.
- Viperin is an interferon-stimulated radical SAM enzyme which converts CTP to ddhCTP (3ʹ-deoxy-3′,4ʹdidehydro-CTP), which is a chain terminator for viral RdRps and therefore a natural antiviral compound.

== Clinical considerations ==
- Deficiency in human tRNA methylthiotransferase eMtaB has been shown to be responsible for abnormal insulin synthesis and predisposition to type 2 diabetes.
- Mutations in human GTP cyclase MoaA has been reported to lead to molybdenum cofactor deficiency, a usually fatal disease accompanied by severe neurological symptoms.
- Mutations in human wybutosine-tRNA modifying enzyme Tyw1 promotes retrovirus infection.
- Alterations in human tRNA-modifying enzyme Elp3 results in progression into amyotrophic lateral sclerosis (ALS).
- Mutations in human antiviral RSAD1 has been shown to be associated with congenital heart disease.
- Mutations in human sulfurtransferase LipA has been implicated in glycine encephalopathy, pyruvate dehydrogenase and lipoic acid synthetase deficiency.
- Mutations in human methylthiotransferase MiaB are related to impaired cardiac and respiratory functions.

== Therapeutic applications ==
Below are a few examples of radical SAM enzymes have been shown to be promising targets for antibiotic and antiviral development.

- Inhibition of radical SAM enzyme MqnE in menaquinone biosynthesis is reported to be an effective antibacterial strategy against H. pylori.
- Radical SAM enzyme BlsE has been discovered to be a central enzyme in blasticidin S biosynthetic pathway. Blasticidin S produced by Streptomyces griseochromogenes exhibits strong inhibitory activity against rice blast caused by Pyricularia oryzae Cavara. This compound specifically inhibits protein synthesis in both prokaryotes and eukaryotes through inhibition of peptide bond formation in the ribosome machinery.
- A new fungal radical SAM enzyme has also been reported to facilitate the biocatalytic routes for synthesis of 3'-deoxy nucleotides/nucleosides. 3'deoxynucleotides are a class of drugs that interfere with the metabolism of nucleotides, and their incorporation into DNA or RNA terminates cell division and replication. This activity explains why this compound is an essential group of antiviral, antibacterial or anticancer drug.

== Examples ==
Examples of radical SAM enzymes found within the radical SAM superfamily include:

- AblA - lysine 2,3-aminomutase (osmolyte biosynthesis - N-epsilon-acetyl-beta-lysine)
- AlbA - subtilosin maturase (peptide modification)
- AtsB - anaerobic sulfatase activase (enzyme activation)
- BchE - anaerobic magnesium protoporphyrin-IX oxidative cyclase (cofactor biosynthesis - chlorophyll)
- BioB - biotin synthase (cofactor biosynthesis - biotin)
- BlsE - cytosylglucuronic acid decarboxylase - blasticidin S biosynthesis
- BtrN - butirosin biosynthesis pathway oxidoreductase (aminoglycoside antibiotic biosynthesis)
- BzaF - 5-hydroxybenzimidazole (5-HBI) synthesis (cobalt binding ligand of cobalamin)
- Cfr - 23S rRNA (adenine^{2503}-C^{8})-methyltransferase - rRNA modification for antibiotic resistance
- CofG - FO synthase, CofG subunit (cofactor biosynthesis - F420)
- CofH - FO synthase, CofH subunit (cofactor biosynthesis - F420)
- CutD - trimethylamine lyase-activating enzyme
- DarE - darobactin maturase
- DesII - D-desosamine biosynthesis deaminase (sugar modification for macrolide antibiotic biosynthesis)
- EpeE - biosynthesis of epipeptide (RiPP)
- EpmB - elongation factor P beta-lysylation protein (protein modification)
- HemN - oxygen-independent coproporphyrinogen III oxidase (cofactor biosynthesis - heme)
- HmdB - 5,10-methenyltetrahydromethanopterin hydrogenase cofactor biosynthesis protein HmdB (note unusual CX5CX2C motif)
- HpnR - hopanoid C-3 methylase (lipid biosynthesis - 3-methylhopanoid production)
- HydE - [FeFe] hydrogenase H-cluster radical SAM maturase (metallocluster assembly)
- HydG - [FeFe] hydrogenase H-cluster radical SAM maturase (metallocluster assembly)
- LipA - lipoyl synthase (cofactor biosynthesis - lipoyl)
- MftC - mycofactocin system maturase (peptide modification/cofactor biosynthesis - predicted)
- MiaB - tRNA methylthiotransferase (tRNA modification)
- Mmp10 - methyl-coenzyme M reductase (MCR) post-translational modification
- MoaA - GTP 3',8-cyclase (cofactor biosynthesis - molybdopterin)
- MqnC - dehypoxanthine futalosine cyclase (cofactor biosynthesis - menaquinone via futalosine)
- MqnE - aminofutalosine synthase (cofactor biosynthesis - menaquinone via futalosine)
- NifB - cofactor biosynthesis protein NifB (cofactor biosynthesis - FeMo cofactor)
- NirJ - heme d1 biosynthesis radical SAM protein NirJ (cofactor biosynthesis - heme d1)
- NosL - complex rearrangement of tryptophan to 3-methyl-2-indolic acid - nosiheptide biosynthesis
- NrdG - anaerobic ribonucleoside-triphosphate reductase activase (enzyme activation)
- PflA - pyruvate formate-lyase activating enzyme (enzyme activation)
- PhpK - radical SAM P-methyltransferase - antibiotic biosynthesis
- PqqE - PQQ biosynthesis enzyme (peptide modification / cofactor biosynthesis - PQQ)
- PylB - methylornithine synthase, pyrrolysine biosynthesis protein PylB (amino acid biosynthesis - pyrrolysine)
- QhpD (PeaB) - quinohemoprotein amine dehydrogenase maturation protein (enzyme activation)
- QueE - 7-carboxy-7-deazaguanine (CDG) synthase
- RimO - ribosomal protein S12 methylthiotransferase
- RlmN - 23S rRNA (adenine(2503)-C(2))-methyltransferase (rRNA modification)
- ScfB - SCIFF maturase (peptide modification by thioether cross-link formation)
- SkfB - sporulation killing factor maturase
- SplB - spore photoproduct lyase (DNA repair)
- ThiC - 4-amino-5-hydroxymethyl-2-methylpyrimidine phosphate (HMP-P) biosynthesis (cofactor biosynthesis - thiamine)
- ThiH - thiazole phosphate biosynthesis (cofactor biosynthesis - thiamine)
- TrnC - thuricin biosynthesis
- TrnD - thuricin biosynthesis
- TsrT - tryptophan 2-C-methyltransferase (amino acid modification - antibiotic biosynthesis)
- TYW1 - 4-demethylwyosine synthase (tRNA modification)
- YqeV - tRNA methylthiotransferase (tRNA modification)

=== Non-canonical ===
In addition, several non-canonical radical SAM enzymes have been described. These cannot be recognized by the Pfam hidden Markov model PF04055, but still use three Cys residues as ligands to a 4Fe4S cluster and produce a radical from S-adenosylmethionine. These include

- ThiC (PF01964) - thiamine biosynthesis protein ThiC (cofactor biosynthesis - thiamine) (Cys residues near extreme C-terminus)
- Dph2 (PF01866) - diphthamide biosynthesis enzyme Dph2 (protein modification - diphthamide in translation elongation factor 2) (note different radical production, a 3-amino-3-carboxypropyl radical)
- PhnJ (PF06007) - phosphonate metabolism protein PhnJ (C-P phosphonate bond cleavage)
