= Pyridoxine 5-dehydrogenase =

Enzyme

pyridoxine 5-dehydrogenase

Identifiers
- EC no.: 1.1.99.9
- CAS no.: 9023-39-6

Databases
- BRENDA: enzyme data
- ExPASy: NiceZyme view
- KEGG: enzyme entry
- MetaCyc: metabolic pathway
- Rhea: reactions
- PDB structures: RCSB PDB PDBe PDBsum
- Gene Ontology: AmiGO / QuickGO
Search
- PMC: articles
- PubMed: articles
- NCBI: proteins

In enzymology, pyridoxine 5-dehydrogenase (EC 1.1.99.9) is an enzyme that catalyzes the chemical reaction

pyridoxine
+ electron acceptor
isopyridoxal
+ reduced acceptor

The two substrates of this enzyme are pyridoxine and an electron acceptor. Its products are isopyridoxal and the corresponding reduced acceptor.

This enzyme belongs to the family of oxidoreductases, specifically those acting on the CH-OH group of donor with other acceptors. The systematic name of this enzyme class is pyridoxine:acceptor 5-oxidoreductase. Other names in common use include pyridoxal-5-dehydrogenase, pyridoxol 5-dehydrogenase, pyridoxin 5-dehydrogenase, pyridoxine dehydrogenase, pyridoxine 5'-dehydrogenase, and pyridoxine:(acceptor) 5-oxidoreductase. This enzyme participates in vitamin B_{6} metabolism. It has 2 cofactors: FAD, and PQQ.
