= Polyvinyl-alcohol dehydrogenase (acceptor) =

Catalyzing enzyme

polyvinyl-alcohol dehydrogenase (acceptor)

Identifiers
- EC no.: 1.1.99.23
- CAS no.: 119940-13-5

Databases
- IntEnz: IntEnz view
- BRENDA: BRENDA entry
- ExPASy: NiceZyme view
- KEGG: KEGG entry
- MetaCyc: metabolic pathway
- PRIAM: profile
- PDB structures: RCSB PDB PDBe PDBsum
- Gene Ontology: AmiGO / QuickGO
Search
- PMC: articles
- PubMed: articles
- NCBI: proteins

In enzymology, a polyvinyl-alcohol dehydrogenase (acceptor) (EC 1.1.99.23) is an enzyme that catalyzes the chemical reaction

polyvinyl alcohol + acceptor $\rightleftharpoons$ oxidized polyvinyl alcohol + reduced acceptor

Thus, the two substrates of this enzyme are polyvinyl alcohol and acceptor, whereas its two products are oxidized polyvinyl alcohol and reduced acceptor.

This enzyme belongs to the family of oxidoreductases, specifically those acting on the CH-OH group of donor with other acceptors. The systematic name of this enzyme class is polyvinyl-alcohol:acceptor oxidoreductase. Other names in common use include PVA dehydrogenase, and polyvinyl-alcohol:(acceptor) oxidoreductase. It employs one cofactor, PQQ.
