= Streptomyces pathocidini =

Scientific classification
- Domain: Bacteria
- Kingdom: Bacillati
- Phylum: Actinomycetota
- Class: Actinomycetia
- Order: Streptomycetales
- Family: Streptomycetaceae
- Genus: Streptomyces
- Species: S. pathocidini

Binomial name
- Streptomyces pathocidini Labeda et al. 2014

Type strain
- AS 4.1633, ATCC 14510, B-28, BCRC 12331, CCRC 12331, CGMCC 4.1633, CIP 104431, DSM 40799, IFO 13812, JCM 4166, KCC S-0166, KCTC 9671, NBRC 13812, NRRL B-24287, VKM Ac-598

Synonyms
- Streptomyces albus subsp. pathocidicus

Species of bacterium

Streptomyces pathocidini is a bacterium species from the genus of Streptomyces. Streptomyces pathocidini produces blasticidin S and pathocidin-(8-azaguanine).

== See also ==
- List of Streptomyces species
