= Alkan-1-ol dehydrogenase (acceptor) =

Class of enzymes

alkan-1-ol dehydrogenase (acceptor)

Identifiers
- EC no.: 1.1.99.20
- CAS no.: 75496-55-8

Databases
- IntEnz: IntEnz view
- BRENDA: BRENDA entry
- ExPASy: NiceZyme view
- KEGG: KEGG entry
- MetaCyc: metabolic pathway
- PRIAM: profile
- PDB structures: RCSB PDB PDBe PDBsum
- Gene Ontology: AmiGO / QuickGO
Search
- PMC: articles
- PubMed: articles
- NCBI: proteins

In enzymology, an alkan-1-ol dehydrogenase (acceptor) (EC 1.1.99.20) is an enzyme that catalyzes the chemical reaction

primary alcohol + acceptor $\rightleftharpoons$ aldehyde + reduced acceptor

Thus, the two substrates of this enzyme are primary alcohol and acceptor, whereas its two products are aldehyde and reduced acceptor.

This enzyme belongs to the family of oxidoreductases, specifically those acting on the CH-OH group of donor with other acceptors. The systematic name of this enzyme class is alkan-1-ol:acceptor oxidoreductase. Other names in common use include polyethylene glycol dehydrogenase, and alkan-1-ol:(acceptor) oxidoreductase. This enzyme participates in fatty acid metabolism. It employs one cofactor, PQQ.
