= PDH =

PDH or PdH may refer to:

- Angiotensin-converting enzyme, an enzyme
- Palacio de Hierro, luxury department store
- Plesiochronous digital hierarchy, in telecommunications networks
- Pound–Drever–Hall technique for stabilizing a laser's output
- Pyranose dehydrogenase (acceptor), an enzyme
- Pyruvate dehydrogenase, an enzyme
- Party of Humanists (German: Partei der Humanisten), a political party in Germany
