= Tetracenomycin C =

Names
- IUPAC name Methyl (6aR,7S,10aR)-6a,7,10a,12-tetrahydroxy-3,8-dimethoxy-1-methyl-6,10,11-trioxo-6,6a,7,10,10a,11-hexahydrotetracene-2-carboxylate

Identifiers
| CAS Number | 71135-22-3 |
| 3D model (JSmol) | Interactive image |
| Beilstein Reference | 4774234 |
| ChEBI | CHEBI:9470 |
| ChemSpider | 66294 |
| KEGG | C06801 |
| PubChem CID | 73632 |
- InChI: InChI=1S/C23H20O11/c1-8-14-9(6-11(32-2)15(8)21(29)34-4)5-10-16(17(14)25)20(28)22(30)13(24)7-12(33-3)19(27)23(22,31)18(10)26/h5-7,19,25,27,30-31H,1-4H3/t19-,22-,23-/m1/s1 Key: ULHJWHCSSAEMLW-UEVCKROQSA-N
- SMILES: O=C1C=2C(C(=O)[C@@]3(O)[C@]1(O)[C@H](O)C(OC)=CC3=O)=C(O)C=4C(C2)=CC(OC)=C(C(OC)=O)C4C

Properties
| Chemical formula | C_{23}H_{20}O_{11} |
| Molar mass | 472.402 g·mol^{−1} |
- Except where otherwise noted, data are given for materials in their standard state (at 25 °C [77 °F], 100 kPa). Infobox references

Tetracenomycin C is an antitumor anthracycline-like antibiotic produced by Streptomyces glaucescens GLA.0. The pale-yellow antibiotic is active against some gram-positive bacteria, especially against streptomycetes. Gram-negative bacteria and fungi are not inhibited. In considering the differences of biological activity and the functional groups of the molecule, tetracenomycin C is not a member of the tetracycline or anthracyclinone group of antibiotics. Tetracenomycin C is notable for its broad activity against actinomycetes. As in other anthracycline antibiotics, the framework is synthesized by a polyketide synthase and subsequently modified by other enzymes.

== Structure and properties ==
The structure of tetracenomycin C was established by chemical and spectroscopic methods. The three hydroxy groups, at C-4, C-4a, and C-12a, are cis to each other. The two at C-4a and C-12a are involved in intramolecular hydrogen bonding to the carbonyl oxygen atoms at C-5 and C-1, respectively. The carboxymethyl group at C-9 is almost perpendicular to the planar rings C and D. The crystal packing is stabilized by intermolecular hydrogen bonds with participation of methanol molecules.

== Biosynthesis ==
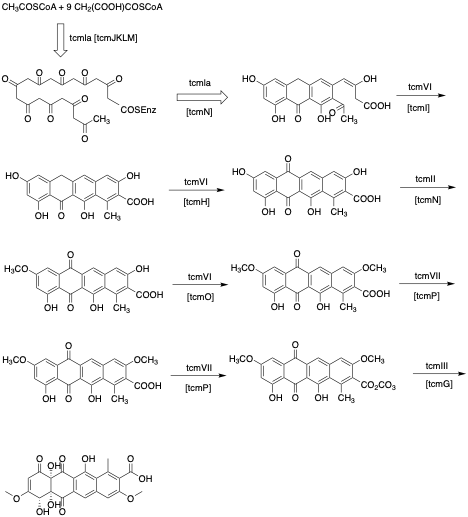
Biosynthesis of Tetracenomycin C

As in other anthracycline antibiotics, the framework is synthesized by a polyketide synthase and subsequently modified by other enzymes. Early studies of tetracenomycin C biosynthesis utilized mutants that were blocked in its production to describe many of the pathway's intermediates.

Complementation of the mutations allowed the cloning of a large gene cluster that included all of the genes required for production, as well as resistance genes. Transformation of the cluster into heterologous streptomycete hosts like Streptomyces lividans resulted in the overproduction of several intermediates of the pathway. Sequence analysis of the polyketide synthase genes showed that they included two β-ketoacyl synthases (tcmK and tcmL), an acyl carrier protein (tcmM), and several cyclases.

Streptomyces glaucescens protects itself from the deleterious effect of tetracenomycin C by the action of the tcmA and tcmR gene products. TcmA has several transmembrane loops and is believed to act as a tetracenomycin C exporter. Its expression is controlled by the TcmR repressor. TcmR binds to operator sites in the tcmA promoter. When tetracenomycin C is present, it binds to TcmR, releasing it from the DNA and initiating tcmA expression.
