= Streptomyces griseochromogenes =

Scientific classification
- Domain: Bacteria
- Kingdom: Bacillati
- Phylum: Actinomycetota
- Class: Actinomycetia
- Order: Streptomycetales
- Family: Streptomycetaceae
- Genus: Streptomyces
- Species: S. griseochromogenes

Binomial name
- Streptomyces griseochromogenes Fukunaga 1955

Type strain
- ATCC 14511, BCRC 11818, CBS 714.72, CCRC 11818, CGMCC 4.1964, DSM 40499, Fukunaga 2A-327, IFM 1229 IFO 13413, ISP 5499, JCM 4039, JCM 4764, KCTC 9027, NBRC 13413, NRRL B-12423, NRRL-ISP 5499, RIA 1374

Species of bacterium

Streptomyces griseochromogenes is a bacterium species from the genus of Streptomyces which has been isolated from soil. Streptomyces griseochromogenes produces blasticidin A, blasticidin B, blasticidin C, blasticidin S, pentalenene and cytomycin.

== See also ==
- List of Streptomyces species
