= Blasticidin-S deaminase =

Class of enzymes

blasticidin-S deaminase

Identifiers
- EC no.: 3.5.4.23
- CAS no.: 54576-55-5

Databases
- BRENDA: enzyme data
- ExPASy: NiceZyme view
- KEGG: enzyme entry
- MetaCyc: metabolic pathway
- Rhea: reactions
- PDB structures: RCSB PDB PDBe PDBsum
- Gene Ontology: AmiGO / QuickGO
Search
- PMC: articles
- PubMed: articles
- NCBI: proteins

Blasticidin-S deaminase (EC 3.5.4.23) is an enzyme characterised from Aspergillus terreus that catalyzes the hydrolysis of the antibiotic, blasticidin S to deaminohydroxyblasticidin S and ammonia. The basis of blasticidin's toxicity is its ability to inhibit peptide bond formation.

blasticidin S
H_{2}O
NH_{3}
deaminohydroxyblasticidin S

The reaction confers resistance to the antibiotic by metabolising it to a non-toxic derivative. Hence it is widely used as a selection marker.

This enzyme is a hydrolase, one acting on carbon-nitrogen bonds other than peptide bonds, specifically in cyclic amidines. The systematic name of this enzyme class is blasticidin-S aminohydrolase.

== Structural studies ==
As of late 2007, two structures have been solved for this class of enzymes, with PDB accession codes PDB: 1WN5 and PDB: 1WN6.
