= 23S rRNA (adenine2503-C8)-methyltransferase =

Class of enzymes

23S rRNA (adenine^{2503}-C^{8})-methyltransferase

Identifiers
- EC no.: 2.1.1.224

Databases
- IntEnz: IntEnz view
- BRENDA: BRENDA entry
- ExPASy: NiceZyme view
- KEGG: KEGG entry
- MetaCyc: metabolic pathway
- PRIAM: profile
- PDB structures: RCSB PDB PDBe PDBsum
Search
- PMC: articles
- PubMed: articles
- NCBI: proteins

23S rRNA (adenine^{2503}-C^{8})-methyltransferase (EC 2.1.1.224, Cfr (gene)) is an enzyme with systematic name S-adenosyl-L-methionine:23S rRNA (adenine^{2503}-C^{8})-methyltransferase. This enzyme catalyses the following chemical reaction

2 S-adenosyl-L-methionine + adenine^{2503} in 23S rRNA $\rightleftharpoons$ S-adenosyl-L-homocysteine + L-methionine + 5'-deoxyadenosine + 8-methyladenine^{2503} in 23S rRNA

This enzyme is a member of the 'AdoMet radical' (radical SAM) family.
