= Methylthiotransferase =

Class of enzymes

Methylthiotransferases are enzymes of the radical S-adenosyl methionine (radical SAM) superfamily. These enzymes catalyze the addition of a methylthio group to various biochemical compounds including tRNA and proteins. Methylthiotransferases are classified into one of four classes based on their substrates and mechanisms. All methylthiotransferases have been shown to contain two Fe-S clusters, one canonical cluster and one auxiliary cluster, that both function in the addition of the methylthio group to the substrate.

== Overview ==
Methylthiotransferases, also known as MTTases, are a subset of the radical SAM enzyme superfamily. These enzymes catalyze the addition of a methylthio group to either a protein or tRNA substrate. Radical S-adenosylmethionine enzymes, otherwise known as radical SAM enzymes, are metalloproteins that cleave S-adenosyl-L-methionine into L-methionine and a 5'-deoxyadenosyl 5'-radical (5'-dA). 5'-dA is an intermediate in the reactions catalyzed by radical SAMs. 5'-dA removes a hydrogen from the substrate and allows for the addition of another group to that carbon on the substrate. In order to complete their reactions, all radical SAMs require a reduced [4Fe-4S] cluster, which is found through a conserved cysteine motif, CX_{3}CX_{2}C. Radical SAMs can have one or multiple Fe-S clusters. In this case, methylthiotransferases have multiple clusters. Radical SAMs are involved in many cellular processes in all three domains of life including metabolism and the biosynthesis of many cofactors used within the cell.

There are four known classes of Methylthiotransferases; three classes are involved in the methylthiolation of tRNAs and one is involved in the methylthiolation of proteins. All identified methylthiotransferases have two Fe-S active clusters and three characteristic domains within the protein. These three structural domains include an N-terminal uncharacterized protein family 0004 (UPF0004) domain that contains the auxiliary Fe-S cluster, a central radical SAM motif that contains the central active Fe-S motif, and a C-terminal "TRAM" domain that is thought to be involved in substrate recognition. Of the two Fe-S clusters, the central cluster binds the SAM that is used to generate the 5'-dA while the auxiliary cluster has a less studied functionality. Most research suggests that this auxiliary cluster functions as the direct donor of the sulfur during catalysis or it functions to coordinate an exogenous source of sulfur for use during catalysis. In the comparatively well studied methylthiotransferase MiaB, the auxiliary cluster is thought to directly donate the sulfur of the methylthio group during catalysis.

== Proposed mechanism ==
Methylthiotransferases catalyze the addition of a methylthio group to various biochemical products. Transferring methylthio groups is a complicated reaction requiring multiple Fe-S clusters. Previous literature proposed that the enzymes would function sequentially, first adding a sulfur to the substrate and then adding a methyl group derived from the second SAM molecule. This mechanism has not been supported by recent works. Studies now propose that a methyl group from the first SAM molecule is transferred to a sulfur within the auxiliary [4Fe-4S] cluster to form a methylthio group that is then transferred to the product via a radical mechanism facilitated by the 5'-dA radical intermediate produced from the cleavage of the second SAM molecule. The proposed mechanisms for MiaB and RimO slightly differ, with MiaB using a coordinated sulfur as the methylthio group and RimO using an external sulfur attached to the unique iron atom within the cluster as the methylthio group. Despite this difference, both use the same basic principles for the mechanism; create a methylthiolated intermediate using the auxiliary [4Fe-4S] cluster and then add the methylthio group to the substrate.

== Known examples ==
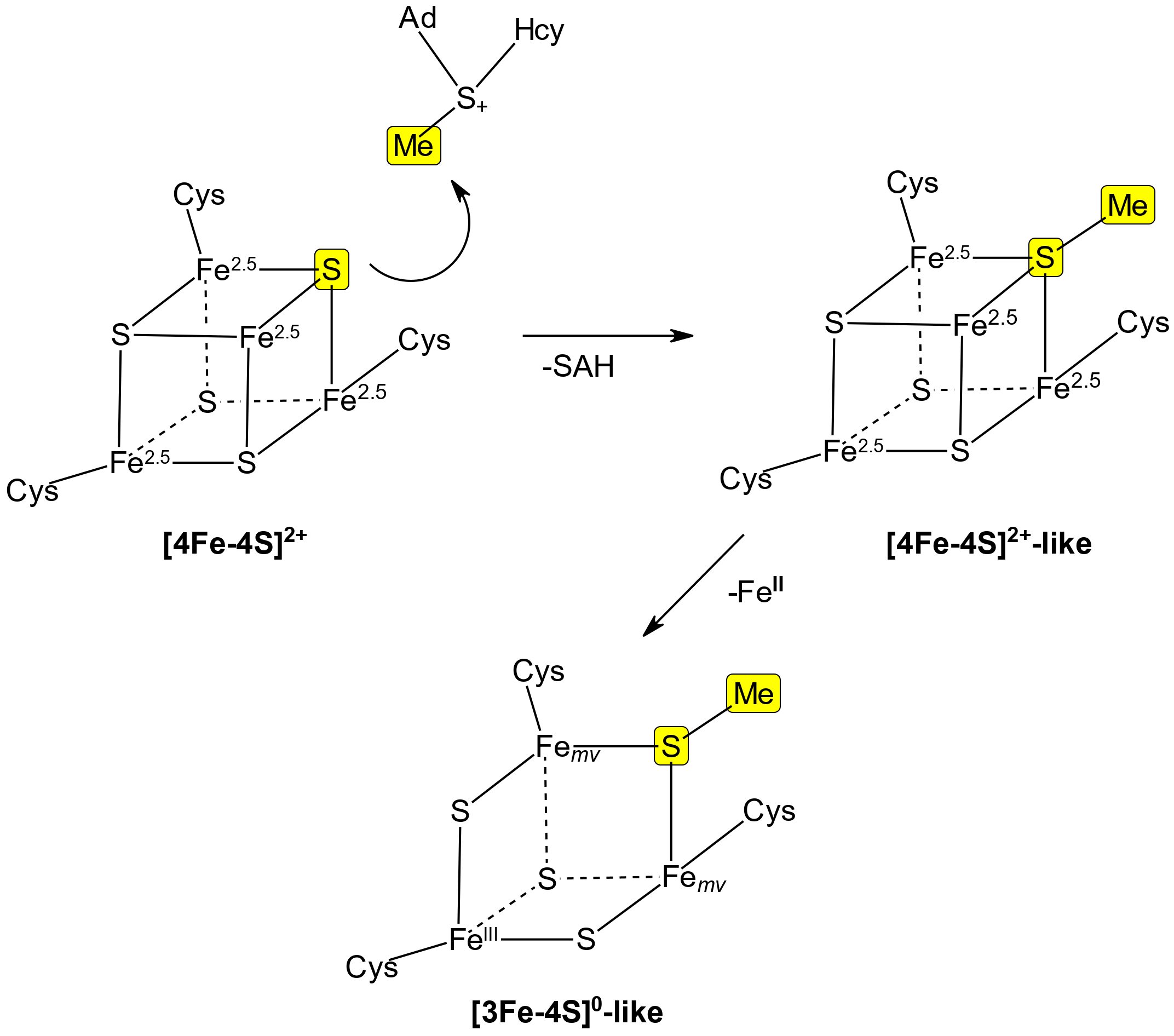
Formation of the [3Fe-4S]^{0} auxiliary cluster of MiaB via the nucleophilic attack of a μ_{3}-bridging sulfide. Adapted from Zhang et al. 2020.

=== MiaB ===
MiaB is a methylthiotransferase that completes the methylthiolation of a modified adenosine base, N^{6}-isopentenyl adenosine to C2-methylthio-N^{6}-isopentenyl adenosine, in tRNA which involves the addition of a methylthiogroup to an inactivate C-H bond. The modification of this base in tRNAs enhances codon-anticodon binding and maintenance of the ribosomal reading frame during translation of an mRNA into protein. Unlike the other methylthiotransferases described here, MiaB donates the sulfur group for methylthiolation itself instead of using a secondary sulfur donor and also completes two SAM-dependent reactions within a single polypeptide.

=== MtaB ===
MtaB is a methylthiotransferase that exists in bacteria, archaea, and eukarya that completes the methylthiolation of the modified adenosine base, N6-threonylcarbamoyladenosine, at position 37 of tRNAs that code for the ANN codons to 2-methylthio-N6-threonylcarbamoyladenosine. When compared to MiaB and RimO, MtaB is much less studied but is still potentially involved in various cellular processes. One potential application of studying this specific MTTase is that it is encoded by the gene CDKAL1 in humans, which is known to increase the reduction of insulin secretion when mutated or downregulated thus leading to a higher risk of the person developing type 2 diabetes.

=== RimO ===
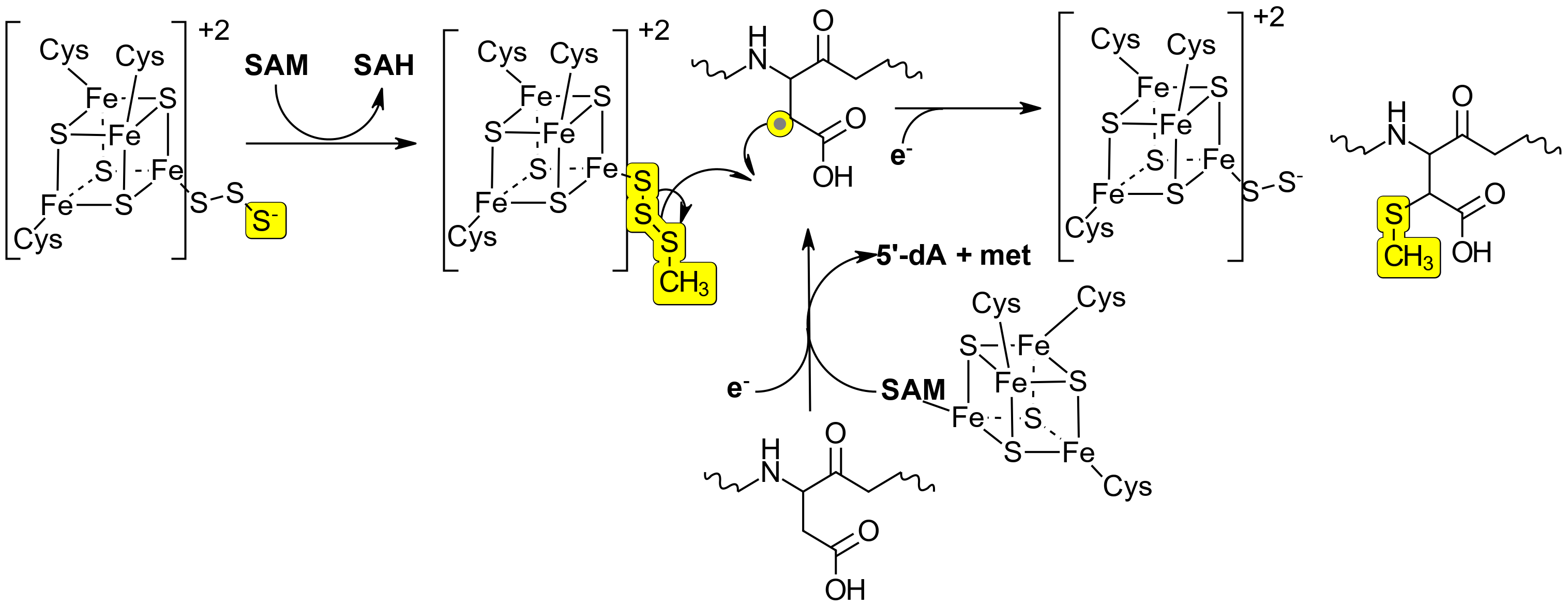
Mechanism of RimO catalyzed addition of a methylthio group to the β-carbon of aspartate. Adapted from Landgraf et al. 2013.

RimO is a methylthiotransferase that completes the methylthiolation of the β-carbon of the Asp88 residue of the ribosomal S12 protein in bacteria, specifically E. coli. This MTTase is the first identified to create post-translational modifications as all other previously identified MTTases modify tRNAs. Though RimO acts on a different substrate than the other classes of MTTases, the primary structure of the protein and the mechanism behind its action are relatively similar.
