= 5,6-Dihydro-5(α-thyminyl)thymine =

Names
- Preferred IUPAC name 5-[(5-Methyl-2,4-dioxo-1,3-diazinan-5-yl)methyl]pyrimidine-2,4(1H,3H)-dione
- Other names 5-Thyminyl-5,6-dihydrothymine

Identifiers
CAS Number	28100-77-8
3D model (JSmol)	Interactive image
ChEBI	with sugars: CHEBI:139518
ChemSpider	141931
PubChem CID	161592
UNII	C3DJU5GG8E
CompTox Dashboard (EPA)	DTXSID10950840
- InChI: InChI=1S/C10H12N4O4/c1-10(4-12-9(18)14-7(10)16)2-5-3-11-8(17)13-6(5)15/h3H,2,4H2,1H3,(H2,11,13,15,17)(H2,12,14,16,18) Key: RQDDFAKFBFKUBC-UHFFFAOYSA-N
- SMILES: CC1(CNC(=O)NC1=O)CC2=CNC(=O)NC2=O

Properties
Chemical formula	C_{10}H_{12}N_{4}O_{4}
Molar mass	252.230 g·mol^{−1}
- Except where otherwise noted, data are given for materials in their standard state (at 25 °C [77 °F], 100 kPa). Infobox references

5,6-Dihydro-5(α-thyminyl)thymine is a DNA pyrimidine dimer photoproduct produced when DNA in bacterial spores is exposed to ultraviolet light. In bacteria, this DNA base dimer deforms the structure of DNA, so endospore forming bacteria have an enzyme called spore photoproduct lyase that repairs this damage.

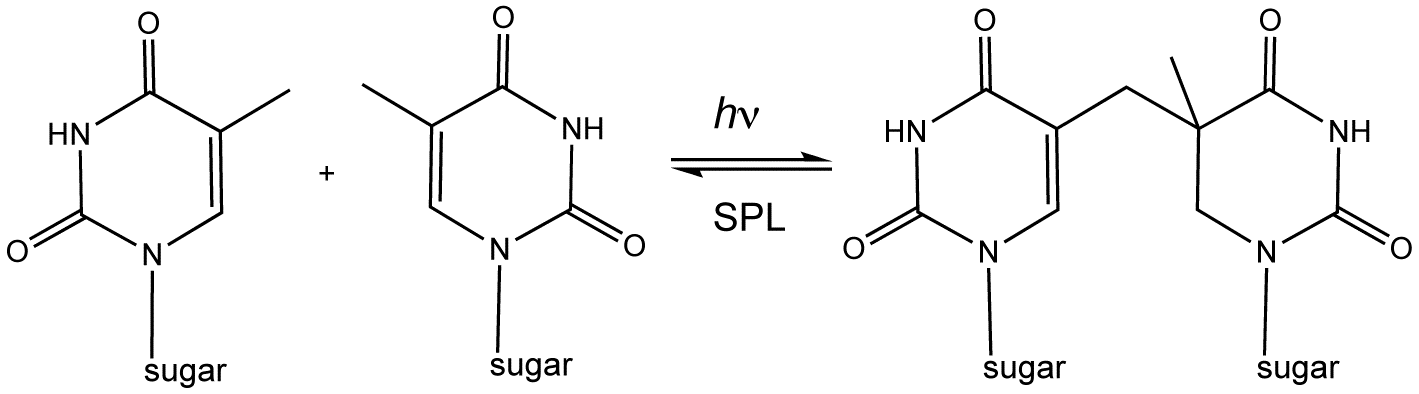
Natural production and repair of 5,6-dihydro-5(α-thyminyl)thymine

== Laboratory synthesis ==
5,6-Dihydro-5(α-thyminyl)thymine can also be synthesized in a laboratory by reacting 5-hydroxymethyluracil and 6-aminothymine yielding 5,6-dihydro-6-imino-5-(α-thyminyl)thymine. When hydrogen is added in a reduction then 5,6-dihydro-5(α-thyminyl)thymine is the product.
