= Spore photoproduct lyase =

Identifiers
- EC no.: 4.1.99.14
- CAS no.: 37290-70-3

Databases
- IntEnz: IntEnz view
- BRENDA: BRENDA entry
- ExPASy: NiceZyme view
- KEGG: KEGG entry
- MetaCyc: metabolic pathway
- PRIAM: profile
- PDB structures: RCSB PDB PDBe PDBsum
Search
- PMC: articles
- PubMed: articles
- NCBI: proteins

Spore photoproduct lyase (radical SAM)

Identifiers
- Symbol: ?
- InterPro: IPR023897

Spore photoproduct lyase (EC 4.1.99.14SP lyase, SPL, SplB, SplG) is a radical SAM enzyme that repairs DNA cross linking of thymine bases caused by UV-radiation. There are several types of thymine cross linking, but SPL specifically targets 5-thyminyl-5,6-dihydrothymine, which is also called spore photoproduct (SP). Spore photoproduct is the predominant type of thymine crosslinking in germinating endospores, which is why SPL is unique to organisms that produce endospores, such as Bacillus subtilis. Other types of thymine crosslinking, such as cyclobutane pyrimidine dimers (CPD) and pyrimidine (6-4) pyrimidone photoproducts (6-4PPs), are less commonly formed in endospores. These differences in DNA crosslinking are a function of differing DNA structure. Spore genomic DNA features many DNA binding proteins called small acid soluble proteins, which changes the DNA from the traditional B-form conformation to an A-form conformation. This difference in conformation is believed to be the reason why dormant spores predominantly accumulate SP in response to UV-radiation, rather than other forms of cross linking. Spores cannot repair cross-linking while dormant, instead the SPs are repaired during germination to allow the vegetative cell to function normally. When not repaired, spore photoproduct and other types of crosslinking can cause mutations by blocking transcription and replication past the point of the crosslinking. The repair mechanism utilizing spore photoproduct lyase is one of the reasons for the resilience of certain bacterial spores.

The mechanism by which SPL functions is not yet fully understood, though it is known that it catalyzes light independent repair of photodimer 5-thyminyl-5,6-dihydrothymine cross linking through a series of radical reactions to give back two functional thymine rings as shown in the figure below. SPL is part of the radical SAM enzyme family, so it is known to have conserved aspects of its structure and mechanism that allow for it to be characterized as a radical SAM enzyme. Radical SAM enzymes have a conserved cysteine motif, an iron-sulfur cluster within the cysteine motif, as well as S-adenosyl-L-methionine (SAM) as a cofactor. A general radical SAM mechanism involves reducing the iron-sulfur cluster within the enzyme and transferring an electron to the cofactor (SAM), which cleaves a part of the structure and forms a 5'-deoxyadenosyl radical. This 5'-deoxyadenosyl radical will then remove a hydrogen atom from the substrate, forming 5'-deoxyadenosine, and producing a radical on the substrate which will rearrange to form a product. Given that the full mechanism of SPL function is not fully characterized, future studies will likely focus on elucidation of this process.

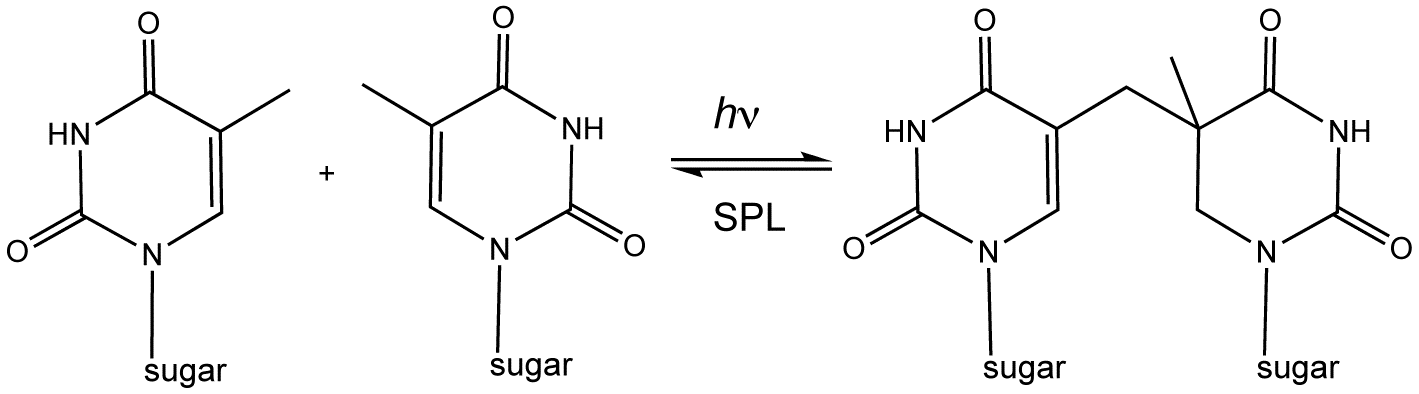

Spore photoproduct lyase is part of one of two main pathways which are used to repair cross linked 5-thyminyl-5,6-dihydrothymine caused by UV radiation: the spore-specific DNA repair system (which utilizes spore photoproduct lyase), and the general nucleotide excision repair pathway (NER). The spore-specific DNA repair system is specific to SP, whereas the NER is able to repair other types of thymine dimers, such as CPDs and 6-4PPs. Spores exhibit high UV susceptibility only when both repair pathways are compromised.
