= Pyrimidine dimer =

Type of DNA damage

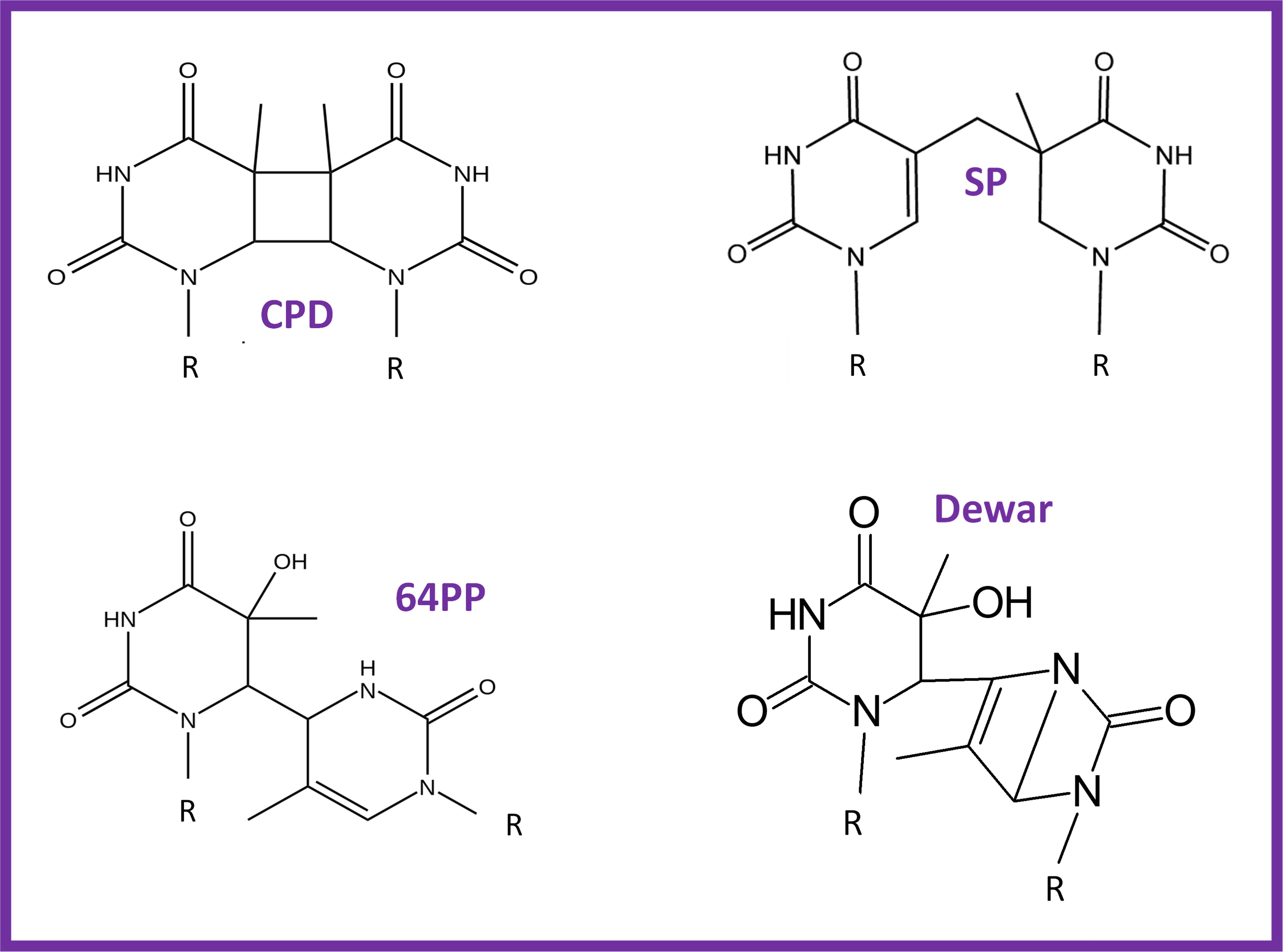
Chemical structures of thymine dimers: cyclobutane thymine dimer (CPD), spore photoproduct (SP), (6–4) pyrimidone photoproduct (64PP) and its Dewar valence isomer (Dewar).

Pyrimidine dimers are chemical species issued from a photochemical reaction involving two pyrimidine (P) nucleobases (thymine, cytosine, or uracil) through formation of new covalent bonds. The discovery of pyrimidine dimers was initially prompted by the observation that ultraviolet (UV) radiation inactivates cells. Over the years, experimental and theoretical studies, performed mainly on model DNA and RNA systems in solution, shed light on the primary processes underlying their formation. In parallel, such dimers have been detected in living cells and skin, and their impact on biological processes has been extensively characterized.

Four principal classes of pyrimidine dimers have been identified: cyclobutane pyrimidine dimers (CPDs, also noted P<>P), (6–4) pyrimidone photoproducts (64PPs), their Dewar valence isomers, and the spore photoproduct (SP). Dimerization may proceed via a direct mechanism, in which UV radiation is absorbed by the pyrimidines, or via an indirect photosensitized process, requiring the action of other molecules absorbing light.

The formation of a pyrimidine dimer within a double helix disrupts Watson–Crick base pairing and distorts the local structure, compromising the accurate transmission of genetic information. If left unrepaired, such lesions can induce transcriptional and replicative errors, contributing to mutagenesis and carcinogenesis. Pyrimidine dimers play a major role in the development of melanoma.

CPDs can undergo photoreversal, a process that regenerates the original nucleobases. In living cells, repair occurs primarily through photoreactivation involving photolyase enzymes or through a base excision repair mechanism.

Beyond the biological significance of pyrimidine dimers as DNA lesions, reversible pyrimidine dimerization has attracted interest for applications in the fields of material science and nanotechnology.

== Photochemistry ==
Among the pyrimidine dimers formed between either identical or different nucleobases, those involving two thymines are by far the most extensively studied from a photochemical perspective. Beyond the dimerization of the major nucleobases, the photochemistry of epigenetic analogs, such as 5-methylcytosine, has also been investigated. While synthetic nucleic acids are more suitable for characterizing the primary processes underlying dimerization in single strands, duplexes and guanine quadruplexes, several studies have also been conducted on purified genomic DNA.

The experimental studies described in this section were performed with nucleic acids in solution.

=== Direct mechanism ===
According to the direct mechanism, UV photons are absorbed by the pyrimidines and the photoreaction proceeds mainly from a singlet excited state. Those states are collective, meaning they are delocalized over both pyrimidines. A minor pathway, proceeding via the thymine triplet state, formed through intersystem crossing, has also been reported for CPDs.

In the case of 64PPs, the direct photochemical process leads to the formation of a reaction intermediate (oxetane), which subsequently undergoes a dark reaction leading to the final dimer. The Dewar valence isomers are obtained upon irradiation of 64PPs, the backbone playing an important role in the reaction. Studies by time-resolved absorption spectroscopy revealed that in thymine single strands CPDs are formed within 1 picosecond, while the reaction leading from the oxetane to 64PPs is completed within 4 milliseconds.

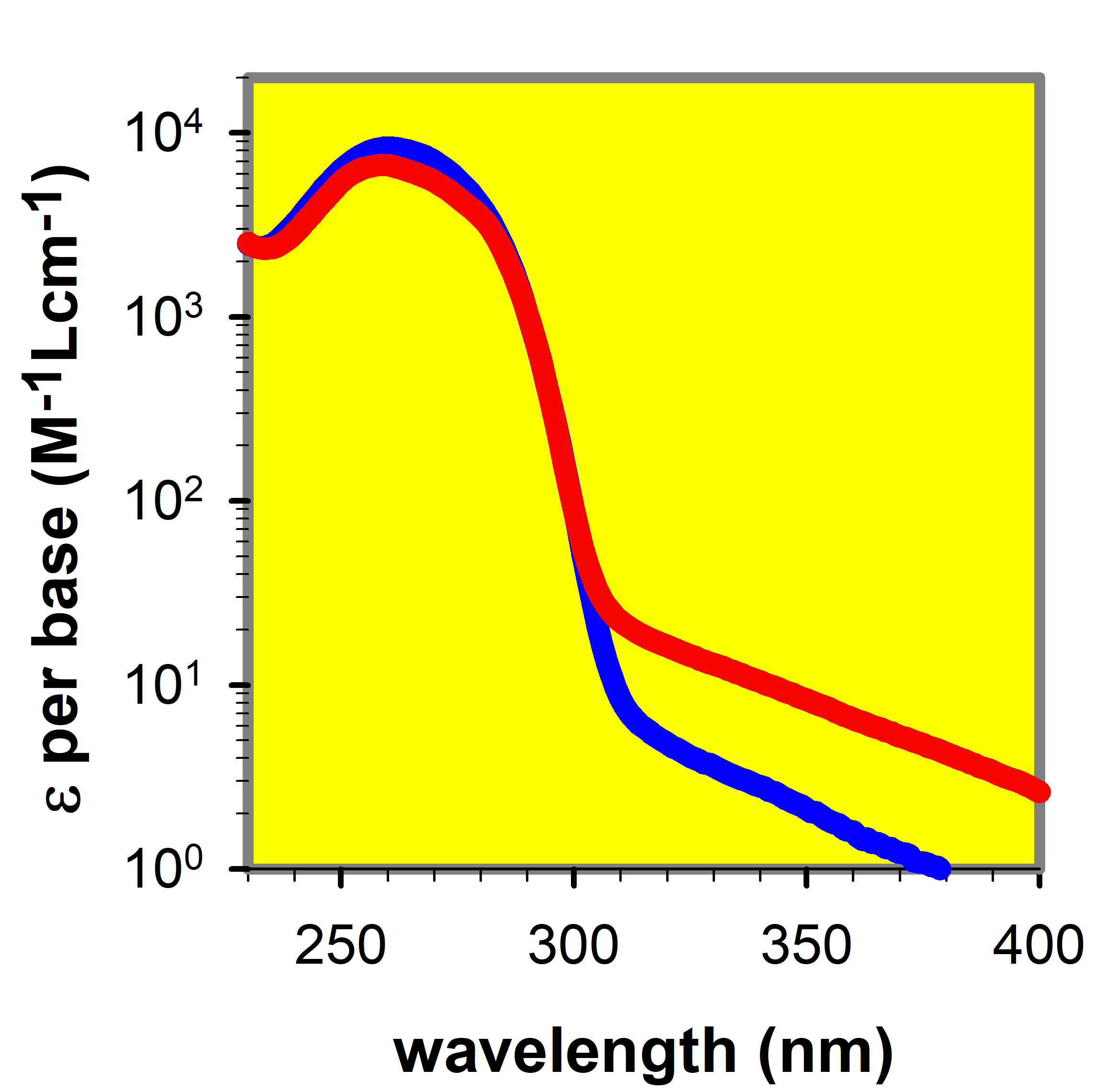
Absorption spectra of DNA single (dT_{20}, blue) and double (dA_{20}dT_{20}, red) strands. Adapted from reference.

The quantum yield of the dimerization reaction (Φ), defined as the number of dimers formed per absorbed photon, and its dependence on the irradiation wavelength are central to these investigations. These parameters are intrinsically linked to nature of the electronic excited state populated upon photon absorption and to their relaxation. In single thymine strands, Φ_{CPD} is constant (0.05), across the main absorption band. In contrast, Φ_{64PP} decreases continuously upon increasing wavelength. No 64PPs are detected upon UVA irradiation, where DNA exhibits weak absorption, whereas CPDs are still induced albeit less efficiently (Φ_{CPD} =7 × 10^{−4}). More importantly, base pairing enhances CPD formation under UVA irradiation, the Φ_{CPD} being higher by a factor of 7, while the opposite trend is observed upon UVC irradiation.

The formation of various pyrimidine dimers was also quantified for isolated purified genomic DNA irradiated at 254 nm. CPDs (total Φ_{CPD} =10^{−3}) are more abundant than 64PP (total Φ_{64PP} = 3 × 10^{−4}). CPD formation has also been reported for this natural biomolecule irradiated with UVA light.

=== Indirect mechanism ===
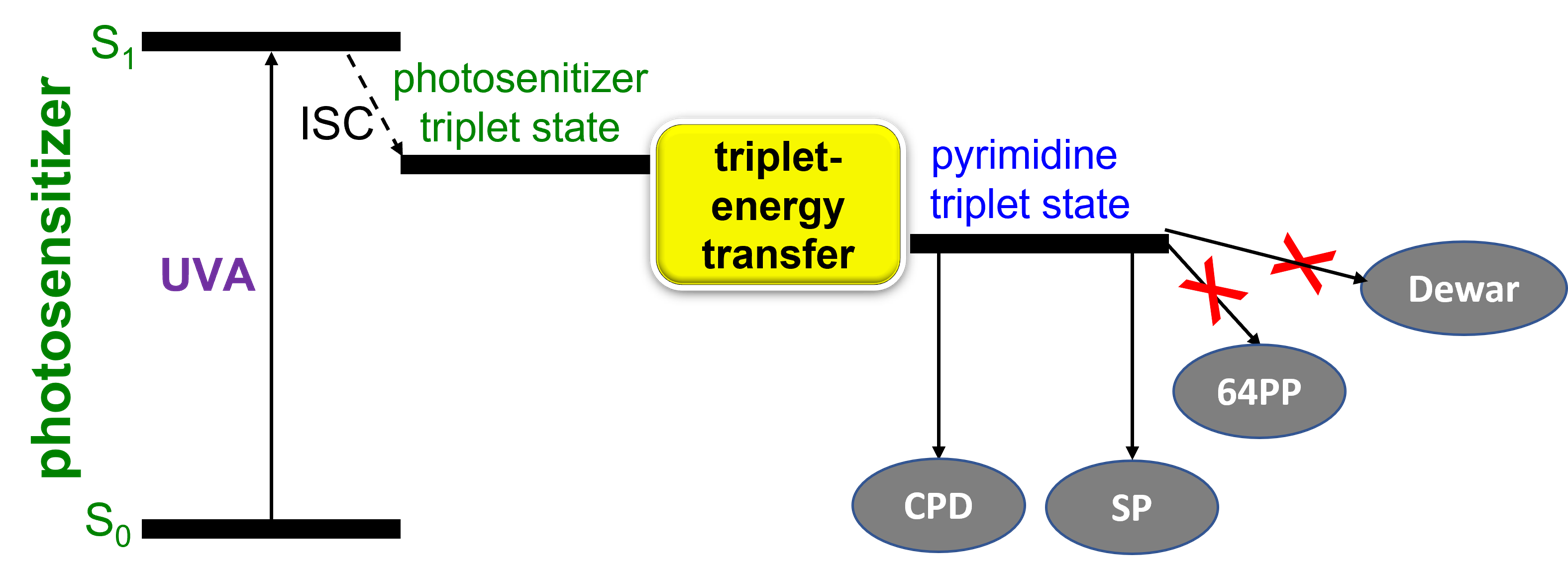
Simplified scheme of the mechanism involved in the photosensitized formation of pyrimidine dimers.

In the indirect mechanism triplet states play a key role. Photons, typically in the UVA range, are absorbed by a photosensitizer whose triplet state is populated via intersystem crossing. Subsequently, the electronic excitation energy is transferred to a pyrimidine triplet state which then triggers dimerization. Both CPDs and the SP are formed via this pathway. In contrast, there is no evidence that photosensitization leads to the formation of 64PPs or their Dewar valence isomers.

A large variety of photosensitizers, such as benzophenones, phthalimides or fluoroquinolones, have been tested in order to study the requirements for photosensitization. In practice, their triplet energy must be higher than those of the pyrimidine triplet states and their quantum yield for intersystem crossing must be sufficiently high. In addition to external agents, 64PPs already present in DNA have the ability to photosensitize CPD formation via the triplet state of pyrimidone. Sensitization may be preceded by triplet energy migration within the double helix; migration distances up to 105 Å have been reported.

=== Optical properties ===
Cyclobutane pyrimidine dimers (CPDs) absorb at significantly shorter wavelengths than the corresponding monomeric pyrimidines; their absorption maximum, located below 220 nm, has not been precisely determined. In contrast, the absorption spectra of 64PPs are strongly red-shifted with respect to their undamaged analogues. In the case of dinucleoside monophosphates, the absorption maxima lie in the range 307–325 nm. Formation of the Dewar valence isomers induces a hypsochromic shift of the absorption spectrum, while preserving a weak absorption tail in the UVA region. The absorption spectrum of the spore photoproduct (SP) is almost identical to that of the initial undamaged pyrimidines.

Among the various pyrimidine dimers, only 64PPs exhibit measurable fluorescence, peaking around 385–400 nm. The corresponding quantum yields are on the order of 10^{−2}, approximately two orders of magnitude higher than the intrinsic fluorescence of undamaged DNA. For this reason, it was already suggested in the 1970s that their emission could serve as an internal indicator for quantifying UV-induced DNA damage. Much later, this approach was proposed for evaluating the efficacy of spermicidal lamps. However, according to studies of the fundamental processes triggered in double helices by UV radiation emission around 400 nm is not suitable for a quantitative assessment of DNA damage.

=== Photoreversal ===
The discovery of pyrimidine dimerization was accompanied by the observation that these lesions can undergo photoreversal, regenerating the original pyrimidine bases. This photoreversibility, which occurs upon irradiation within the absorption band of the dimer, is exclusive to CPDs. The reaction proceeds with a very high quantum yield, close to unity. Subsequently, another type of CPD photoreversal in DNA oligomers, upon selective irradiation of the undamaged nucleobases was reported. This so-called self-repair mechanism was attributed to electron transfer from a flanking purine base to the CPD lesion.

== Structural factors ==
Numerous studies have examined how DNA structure influences the formation of pyrimidine dimers and, conversely, how the presence of these lesions induces structural changes in the nucleic acid. The former effect is driven by conformational factors that establish the geometrical and electronic conditions necessary for dimerization., The latter has significant biological consequences, particularly regarding the recognition of lesions by DNA repair enzymes.

Factors such as ionic strength are known to affect the conformation of the double helix, thereby modulating dimerization quantum yields. Similarly, the presence of a single methyl group at a pyrimidine site can induce structural shifts that modify the quantum yield. A notable example involves the TCG sequences where cytosine is replaced by 5-methylcytosine. These sites are closely associated with mutational hotspots in skin tumors.

The secondary structure of the nucleic acid also dictates the specific isomer of the UV-induced dimer. In genomic double-stranded DNA, only cis-syn CPDs are typically observed. However, upon denaturation, cis-trans isomers appear. Furthermore, while dimerization in B-form DNA usually involves adjacent pyrimidines on the same strand, interstrand dimers have been detected under specific conditions, such as low pH, in A-form DNA, or within guanine guanine quadruplexes.

Various experimental techniques—including X-ray crystallography, NMR spectroscopy, optical spectroscopy, and cryo-electron microscopy —alongside computational methods, have been employed to study the impact of pyrimidine dimers on the overall structure. These investigations encompass isolated model nucleic acids, genomic DNA, nucleosomes, and complexes with repair enzymes. Reported structural distortions include bending, untwisting, the "flipping out" of unpaired nucleobases opposite the lesion, as well as modifications to local conformational motions. The extent of these changes depends on the dimer type, the base sequence, and the initial DNA structure. Collectively, these distortions contribute to the decrease in hypochromicity observed in the absorption spectra of double helices.

== Biological effects ==
=== Mutagenesis ===
Mutagenesis, the process of mutation formation, is significantly influenced by translesion polymerases which often introduce mutations at sites of pyrimidine dimers. This occurs in prokaryotes through the SOS response to mutagenesis and in eukaryotes through other methods. As thymine–thymine CPDs are the most common lesions induced by UV, translesion polymerases show a tendency to incorporate adenines opposite these dimers, resulting in accurate replication. Cytosines that are part of CPDs, however, are susceptible to deamination, leading to cytosine to thymine transitions and contributing to the mutation process.

=== DNA repair ===
Melanoma, a type of skin cancer

Pyrimidine dimers introduce local conformational changes in the DNA structure, which allows recognition of the lesion by repair enzymes. In most organisms (excluding placental mammals such as humans), they can be repaired by photoreactivation. Photoreactivation is a repair process in which photolyase enzymes reverse CPDs using photochemical reactions. In addition, some photolyases can also repair 6-4 photoproducts of UV-induced DNA damage. Photolyase enzymes utilize flavin adenine dinucleotide (FAD) as a cofactor in the repair process.

The UV dose that reduces a population of wild-type yeast cells to 37% (assuming a Poisson distribution of hits) is the same as the UV dose that causes an average of one lethal hit to each of the cells of the population. The number of pyrimidine dimers induced per haploid genome at this dose was measured as 27,000. A mutant yeast strain defective in the three known pyrimidine dimer repair pathways was also tested for UV sensitivity. In this case, only one to two unrepaired pyrimidine dimers per haploid genome are lethal to the cell. These findings thus indicate that the repair of thymine dimers in wild-type yeast is highly efficient.

Nucleotide excision repair (NER), sometimes termed "dark reactivation", is a more general mechanism for repair of lesions and is the most common form of DNA repair for pyrimidine dimers in humans. This process works by using cellular machinery to locate the dimerized nucleotides and excise the lesion. Once the CPD is removed, there is a gap in the DNA strand that must be filled. DNA machinery uses the undamaged complementary DNA strand as a template to synthesize the matching nucleotides and consequently fill in the gap on the damaged strand.

Xeroderma pigmentosum (XP) is a rare genetic disease in humans that is caused by UV damage to genes that code for NER proteins, resulting in the inability for the cell to combat pyrimidine dimers that form. Individuals with XP are also at a much higher risk of cancer, with a >5,000-fold increased risk of developing skin cancers compared to the general population. Some common features and symptoms of XP include skin discoloration and the formation of multiple tumors due to UV exposure.

A few organisms have other ways to perform repairs:

- Spore photoproduct lyase is found in spore-forming bacteria. It reverts thymine dimers to their original state.
- Deoxyribodipyrimidine endonucleosidase is found in bacteriophage T4. It is a base excision repair enzyme specific for pyrimidine dimers, and is able to cut open the AP site.

Another type of repair mechanism that is conserved in humans and other non-mammals is translesion synthesis. Typically, the lesion associated with the pyrimidine dimer blocks cellular machinery from synthesizing past the damaged site. However, in translesion synthesis, translesion polymerases can replicate past the CPD, allowing both replication and transcription machinery to continue past the lesion. One specific translesion DNA polymerase, DNA polymerase η, is deficient in individuals with Xeroderma pigmentosum.

== Technological applications ==
Beyond their role as DNA photolesions, pyrimidine dimers have been investigated as functional photochemical motifs in engineered materials. In such systems, controlled dimer formation and cleavage are used to modulate material properties with spatial resolution.

In the late 20th century, thymine moieties incorporated into polymer films were shown to undergo reversible photodimerization upon UV irradiation. These studies established pyrimidine photodimerization as a crosslinking mechanism in photoresponsive polymers and photorecording materials.

Subsequent work demonstrated pyrimidine dimer formation can be achieved in solid films deposited on quartz substrates via photosensitized indirect mechanisms. Site-specific thymine dimerization has also been applied in DNA nanotechnology. For instance, the formation of cyclobutane pyrimidine dimers between predefined thymidine sites in DNA nanostructures increases structural rigidity and stability, facilitating handling and transfer in aqueous environments. Other researchers used the process to create photoswitchable amphiphilic systems.

In the 2020s, reversible thymine photodimerization in grafted copolymers was employed in the development of self-healing coatings, including materials intended for photovoltaic applications. The efficiency of light-induced healing in rigid membranes and coatings was further enhanced through the incorporation of photosensitizers that promote dimer formation and photoreversion.

== See also ==
- Pyrimidine
- Ultraviolet
- Mutagenesis
- DNA repair
