= Streptomyces glaucescens =

Scientific classification
- Domain: Bacteria
- Kingdom: Bacillati
- Phylum: Actinomycetota
- Class: Actinomycetes
- Order: Streptomycetales
- Family: Streptomycetaceae
- Genus: Streptomyces
- Species: S. glaucescens

Binomial name
- Streptomyces glaucescens (Preobrazhenskaya 1957) Pridham et al. 1958 (Approved Lists 1980)

Type strain
- AS 4.1408, ATCC 19761, ATCC 23622, 19761, BCRC 11478, CBS 261.66, CBS 499.68, CCRC 11478, CCT 5593, CECT 3133, CEST 3133, CGMCC 4.1408, DSM 40155, DSM 41504, DSMZ 40155, ETH 24204, ETH A3080, Gause8731, IFO 12774, IMET 43584, INA 8731, ISP 5155, JCM 4377, KCC S-0377, KCC S-0377, KCCS-0377, KCTC 9881, Lanoot R-8694, LMG 19330, MTCC 276, NBIMCC 1638, NBRC 12774, NCIB 9619, NCIB 9844, NCIMB 9619, NCIMB 9844, NRRL B-2706, NRRL-ISP 5155, PSA 177, R-8694, RIA 1041, UNIQEM 147, VKM Ac-617

Synonyms
- "Actinomyces glaucescens" Preobrazhenskaya 1957

Species of bacterium

Streptomyces glaucescens is a bacterium species from the genus of Streptomyces which has been isolated from soil. Streptomyces glaucescens produces tetracenomycin C, tetracenomycin D and tetracenomycin E.

== See also ==
- List of Streptomyces species
