= Quinoprotein glucose dehydrogenase =

Enzyme

Identifiers
- EC no.: 1.1.5.2
- CAS no.: 81669-60-5

Databases
- IntEnz: IntEnz view
- BRENDA: BRENDA entry
- ExPASy: NiceZyme view
- KEGG: KEGG entry
- MetaCyc: metabolic pathway
- PRIAM: profile
- PDB structures: RCSB PDB PDBe PDBsum
Search
- PMC: articles
- PubMed: articles
- NCBI: proteins

In enzymology, quinoprotein glucose dehydrogenase (EC 1.1.5.2) is an enzyme that catalyzes the chemical reaction

D-glucose
+ ubiquinone
glucono-δ-lactone
+ ubiquinol

The two substrates of this enzyme are D-glucose and the cofactor ubiquinone. Its products are glucono-δ-lactone and ubiquinol.

This enzyme belongs to the family of oxidoreductases, specifically those acting on the CH-OH group of donor with a quinone or similar compound as acceptor. The systematic name of this enzyme class is D-glucose:ubiquinone oxidoreductase. Other names in common use include D-glucose:(pyrroloquinoline-quinone) 1-oxidoreductase, glucose dehydrogenase (PQQ-dependent), glucose dehydrogenase (pyrroloquinoline-quinone), and quinoprotein D-glucose dehydrogenase. This enzyme participates in pentose phosphate pathway. It employs one cofactor, PQQ.
