= CDKAL1 =

Protein-coding gene in humans

Identifiers
- Aliases: CDKAL1, CDK5 regulatory subunit associated protein 1 like 1
- External IDs: OMIM: 611259; MGI: 1921765; GeneCards: CDKAL1
Enzyme activity
EC #	BRENDA	ExPASy	KEGG	MetaCyc
2.8.4.5	↗	↗	↗	↗

Gene location (Human)
Chr.	Chromosome 6 (human)
Band	6p22.3	Start	20,534,457 bp
Band	6p22.3	End	21,232,404 bp

Gene location (Mouse)
Chr.	Chromosome 13 (mouse)
Band	13|13 A3.1- A3.2	Start	29,375,729 bp
Band	13|13 A3.1- A3.2	End	30,039,657 bp
RNA expression pattern
Bgee	Human / Mouse (ortholog); Top expressed in: buccal mucosa cell; Achilles tendon; ganglionic eminence; ventricular zone; testicle; gonad; muscle of thigh; gastrocnemius muscle; epithelium of colon; stromal cell of endometrium / Top expressed in: spermatocyte; ascending aorta; spermatid; aortic valve; muscle of thigh; triceps brachii muscle; sternocleidomastoid muscle; zygote; seminiferous tubule; temporal muscle; More reference expression data
BioGPS	n/a
Gene ontology
Molecular function	transferase activity; N6-threonylcarbomyladenosine methylthiotransferase activity; iron-sulfur cluster binding; metal ion binding; protein binding; catalytic activity; tRNA (N(6)-L-threonylcarbamoyladenosine(37)-C(2))-methylthiotransferase; 4 iron, 4 sulfur cluster binding
Cellular component	integral component of membrane; rough endoplasmic reticulum; endoplasmic reticulum membrane; membrane; endoplasmic reticulum
Biological process	maintenance of translational fidelity; tRNA methylthiolation; tRNA processing; tRNA modification; biological process
Sources:Amigo / QuickGO
Orthologs
Databases	NCBI: entry; OMA: entry
Species	Human	Mouse
Entrez	54901	68916
Ensembl	ENSG00000145996	ENSMUSG00000006191
UniProt	Q5VV42	Q91WE6
RefSeq (mRNA)	NM_017774	NM_144536; NM_001308486
RefSeq (protein)	NP_060244	NP_001295415; NP_653119
Location (UCSC)	Chr 6: 20.53 – 21.23 Mb	Chr 13: 29.38 – 30.04 Mb
PubMed search
- Wikidata
View/Edit Human	View/Edit Mouse

CDKAL1 (Cdk5 regulatory associated protein 1-like 1) is a gene in the methylthiotransferase family. The complete physiological function and implications of this have not been fully determined. CDKAL1 is known to code for CDK5, a regulatory subunit-associated protein 1. This protein CDK5 regulatory subunit-associated protein 1 is found broadly across tissue types including neuronal tissues and pancreatic beta cells. CDKAL1 is suspected to be involved in the CDK5/p35 pathway, in which p35 is the activator for CDK5 which regulates several neuronal functions.

== Structure and function ==
Structurally CDKAL1 contains two iron (Fe) sulfur (S) clusters, therefore its function can be reduced by inhibiting Fe-S cluster biosynthesis. Enzymatically, CDKAL1 catalyzes methylthiolation of N6-threonylcarbamoyl adenosine 37 (t6A37) in cytosolic tRNA, which has been determined to stabilize anticodon-codon interactions during translation.

== Clinical significance ==
In humans, CDKAL1 is indicated to be involved in type II diabetes. Mutations in CDKAL1 and TCF7L2 have been associated with low production of insulin. Some studies indicate that CDKAL1 variants modify tRNA resulting in increased risks of type II diabetes as well as obesity. Variation in CDKAL1 was also attributed to differences in energy regulation. Single nucleotide polymorphism analysis resulted in the discovery of the mechanism of glucose and insulin responses demonstrated in the figure. From this relationship, it has been hypothesized that the regulatory genes CDKAL1 and GIP (glucose-dependent insulinotropic polypeptide) are related to environmental selectivity and adaptive immunity.

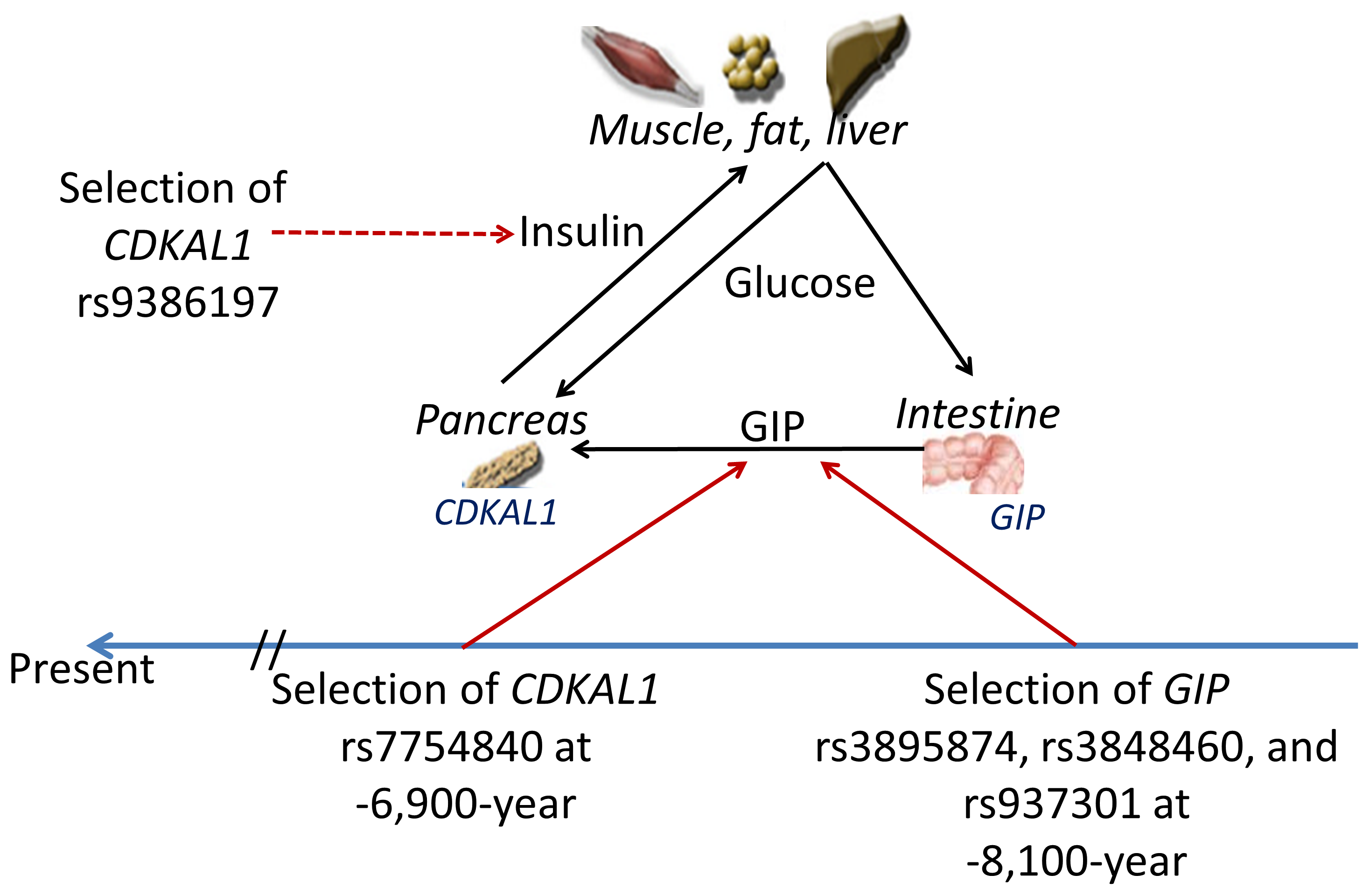
Schematic of CDKAL1 involvement with insulin and glucose regulation.

Genome-wide association studies have linked single nucleotide polymorphisms in an intron on chromosome 6 with susceptibility to type 2 diabetes`. [provided by RefSeq, May 2010].

== Animal studies ==
In mice, CDKAL1 impairment reduces the mouse's ability to maintain glucose homeostasis and causes pancreatic islet hypertrophy, or pancreatic lesions.
