= Pyrroloquinoline-quinone synthase =

Class of enzymes

Identifiers
- EC no.: 1.3.3.11

Databases
- BRENDA: enzyme data
- ExPASy: NiceZyme view
- KEGG: enzyme entry
- MetaCyc: metabolic pathway
- Rhea: reactions
- PDB structures: RCSB PDB PDBe PDBsum
Search
- PMC: articles
- PubMed: articles
- NCBI: proteins

In enzymology, pyrroloquinoline-quinone synthase (EC 1.3.3.11) is an enzyme that catalyzes the chemical reaction

AHQQ
3 O_{2}
2 H_{2}O_{2}
3 O_{2}
2 H_{2}O_{2}
pyrroloquinoline quinone
+ H_{2}O

The substrates of this enzyme are 6-(2-amino-2-carboxyethyl)-7,8-dioxo-1,2,3,4,7,8-hexahydroquinoline-2,4-dicarboxylic acid (AHQQ) and three equivalents of oxygen. Its products are the redox cofactor pyrroloquinoline quinone, two equivalents of hydrogen peroxide, and one of water. The details of the stereochemistry of the starting material are not known, although the structure of the enzyme from Klebsiella pneumoniae has been established.

This enzyme belongs to the family of oxidoreductases, specifically those acting on the CH-CH group of donor with oxygen as acceptor. The systematic name of this enzyme class is 6-(2-amino-2-carboxyethyl)-7,8-dioxo-1,2,3,4,5,6,7,8-octahydroquinol ine-2,4-dicarboxylate:oxygen oxidoreductase (cyclizing). This enzyme is also called PqqC.
