= Biotin synthase =

Enzyme

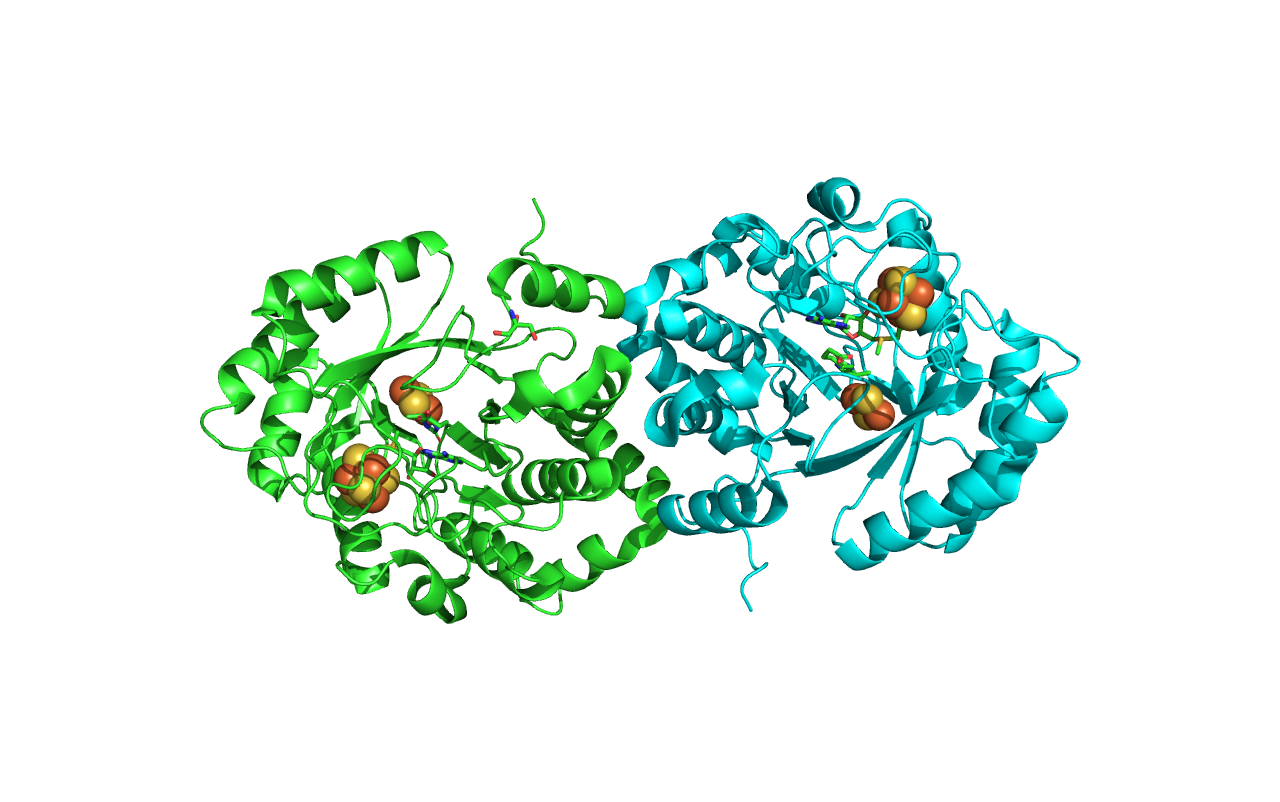
- Crystal Structure of biotin synthase

Identifiers
- EC no.: 2.8.1.6
- CAS no.: 80146-93-6

Databases
- IntEnz: IntEnz view
- BRENDA: BRENDA entry
- ExPASy: NiceZyme view
- KEGG: KEGG entry
- MetaCyc: metabolic pathway
- PRIAM: profile
- PDB structures: RCSB PDB PDBe PDBsum
- Gene Ontology: AmiGO / QuickGO
Search
- PMC: articles
- PubMed: articles
- NCBI: proteins

Biotin synthase (BioB) (EC 2.8.1.6) is an enzyme that catalyzes the conversion of dethiobiotin (DTB) to biotin; this is the final step in the biotin biosynthetic pathway. Biotin, also known as vitamin B7, is a cofactor used in carboxylation, decarboxylation, and transcarboxylation reactions in many organisms including humans. Biotin synthase is an S-Adenosylmethionine (SAM) dependent enzyme that employs a radical mechanism to thiolate dethiobiotin, thus converting it to biotin.

This radical SAM enzyme belongs to the family of transferases, specifically the sulfurtransferases, which transfer sulfur-containing groups. The systematic name of this enzyme class is dethiobiotin:sulfur sulfurtransferase. This enzyme participates in biotin metabolism. It employs one cofactor, iron-sulfur.

== Structure ==
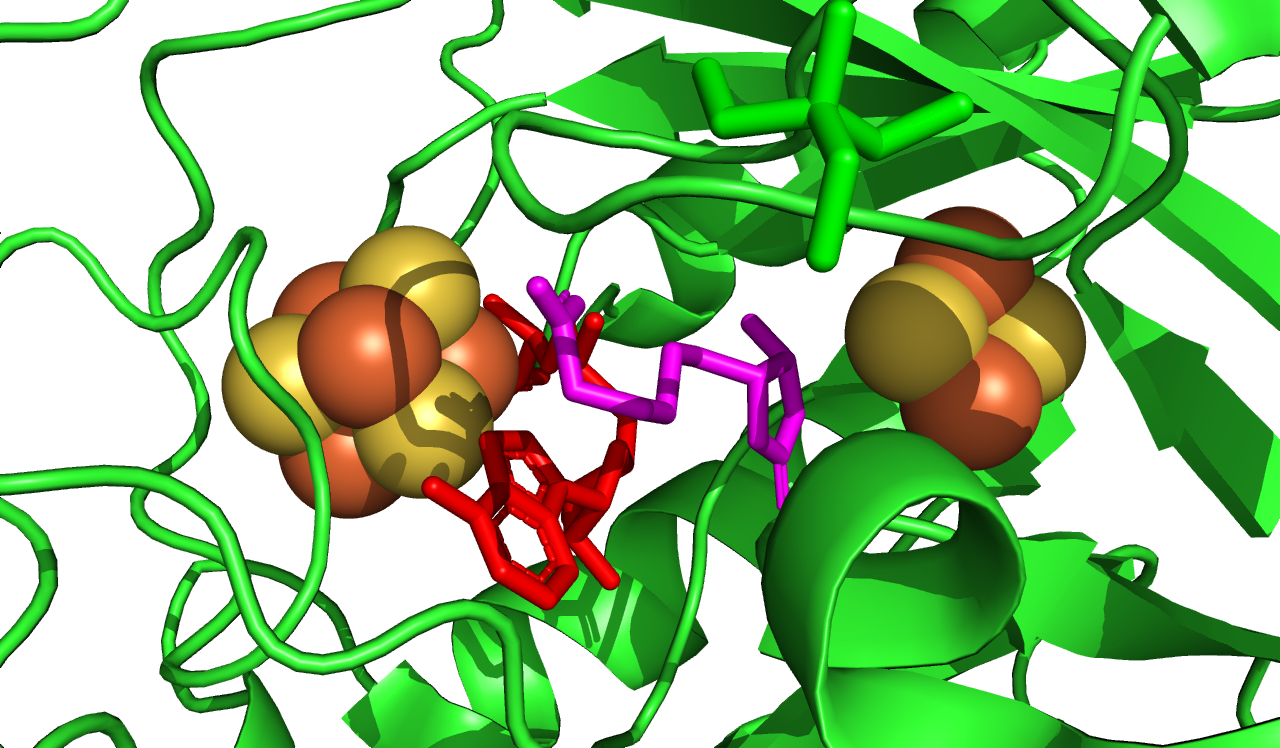
Shown is the biotin synthase active site with [2Fe-2S] and [4Fe-4S] clusters along with dethiobiotin (purple) and S-Adenosylmethionine (red)

In 2004, the crystal structure of biotin synthase in complex with SAM and dethiobiotin was determined to 3.4 angstrom resolution. The PDB accession code for this structure is 1R30. The protein is a homodimer, meaning it is composed of two identical amino acid chains that fold together to form biotin synthase. Each monomer in the structure shown in figure contains a TIM barrel with an [4Fe-4S]^{2+}cluster, SAM, and an [2Fe-2S]^{2+}cluster.

The [4Fe-4S]^{2+}cluster is used as a catalytic cofactor, directly coordinating to SAM. Orbital overlap between SAM and a unique Fe atom on the [4Fe-4S]^{2+}cluster has been observed. The predicted role of the [4Fe-4S]^{2+}cofactor is to transfer an electron onto SAM through an inner sphere mechanism, forcing it into an unstable high energy state that ultimately leads to the formation of the 5’deoxyadenosyl radical.

The [2Fe-2S]^{2+}cluster is thought to provide a source of sulfur from which to thiolate DTB. Isotopic labelling and spectroscopic studies show destruction of the [2Fe-2S]^{2+}cluster accompanies BioB turnover, indicating that it is likely sulfur from [2Fe-2S]^{2+}that is being incorporated into DTB to form biotin.

== Mechanism ==
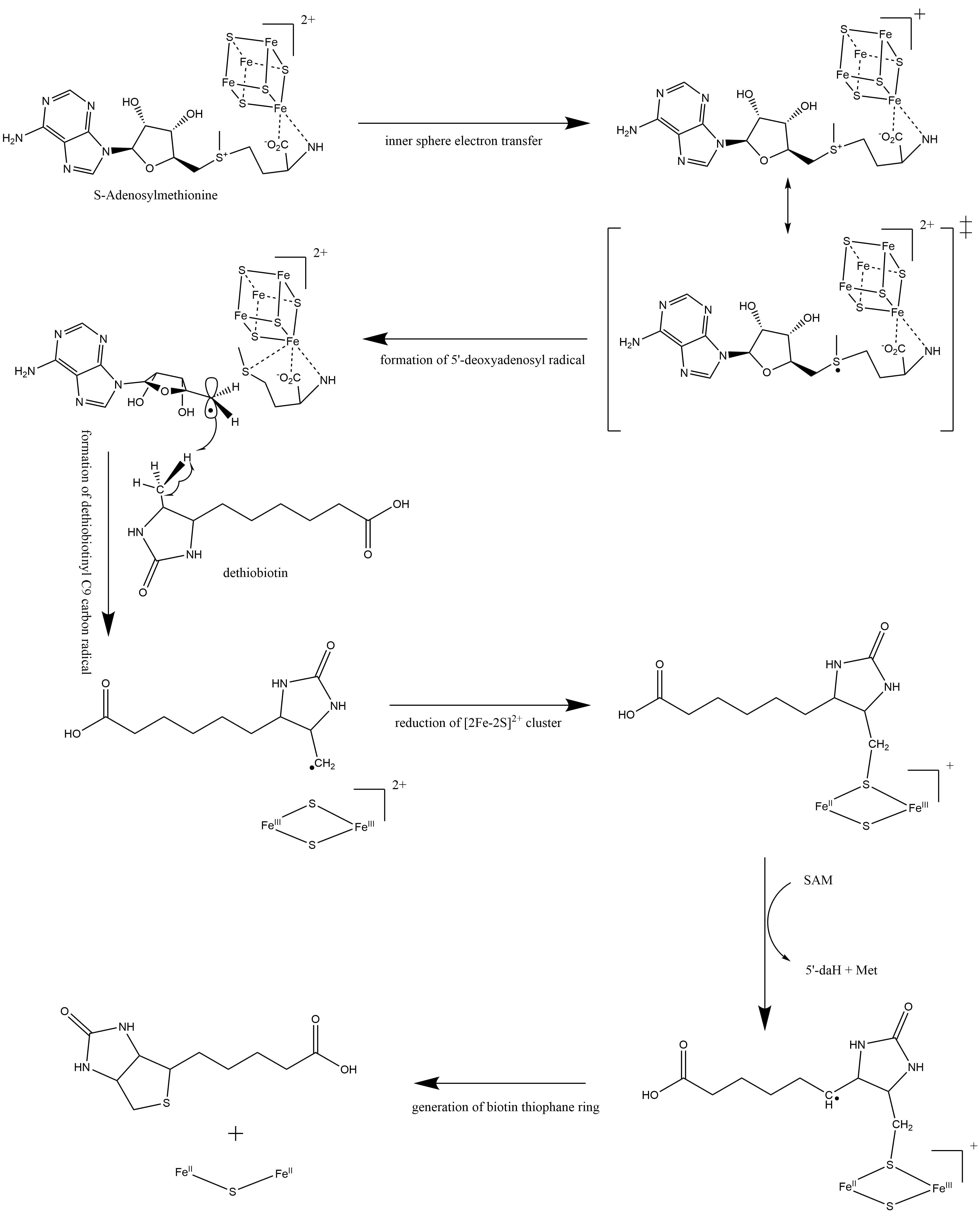
Pictured is the detailed proposed mechanism for biotin synthase.

The reaction catalyzed by biotin synthase can be summarized as follows:

dethiobiotin + sulfur + 2 S-adenosyl-L-methionine $\rightleftharpoons$ biotin + 2 L-methionine + 2 5'-deoxyadenosine

The proposed mechanism for biotin synthase begins with an inner sphere electron transfer from the sulfur on SAM, reducing the [4Fe-4S]^{2+}cluster. This results in a spontaneous C-S bond cleavage, generating a 5’-deoxyadenosyl radical (5’-dA). This carbon radical abstracts a hydrogen from dethiobiotin, forming a dethiobiotinyl C9 carbon radical, which is immediately quenched by bonding to a sulfur atom on the [2Fe-2S]^{2+}. This reduces one of the iron atoms from Fe^{III} to Fe^{II}. At this point, the 5’-deoxyadenosyl and methionine formed earlier are exchanged for a second equivalent of SAM. Reductive cleavage generates another 5’-deoxyadenosyl radical, which abstracts a hydrogen from C6 of dethiobiotin. This radical attacks the sulfur attached to C9 and forms the thiophane ring of biotin, leaving behind an unstable diferrous cluster that likely dissociates.

The use of an inorganic sulfur source is quite unusual for biosynthetic reactions involving sulfur. However, dethiobiotin contains nonpolar, unactivated carbon atoms at the locations of desired C-S bond formation. The formation of the 5’-dA radical allows for hydrogen abstraction of the unactivated carbons on DTB, leaving behind activated carbon radicals ready to be functionalized. By nature, radical chemistry allows for chain reactions because radicals are easily quenched through C-H bond formation, resulting in another radical on the atom the hydrogen came from. We can consider the possibility of a free sulfide, alkane thiol, or alkane persulfide being used as the sulfur donor for DTB. At physiological pH, these would all be protonated, and the carbon radical would likely be quenched by hydrogen atom transfer rather than by C-S bond formation.

== Relevance to humans ==
Biotin synthase is not found in humans. Since biotin is an important cofactor for many enzymes, humans must consume biotin through their diet from microbial and plant sources. However, the human gut microbiome has been shown to contain Escherichia coli that do contain biotin synthase, providing another source of biotin for catalytic use. The amount of E. coli that produce biotin is significantly higher in adults than in babies, indicating that the gut microbiome and developmental stage should be taken into account when assessing a person's nutritional needs.
