= Blasticidin A =

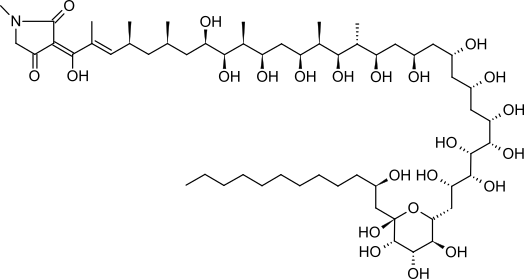

Names
- IUPAC name 1-methyl-3-[1,8,9,11,13,15,17,19,21,23,25,26,27,28,29-pentadecahydroxy-2,4,6,10,14,16-hexamethyl-30-[3,4,5,6-tetrahydroxy-6-(2-hydroxydodecyl)oxan-2-yl]triacont-2-enylidene]pyrrolidine-2,4-dione

Identifiers
CAS Number	100513-53-9
3D model (JSmol)	Interactive image
ChemSpider	68004077
PubChem CID	76169554
- InChI: InChI=1S/C58H107NO23/c1-9-10-11-12-13-14-15-16-17-35(60)27-58(81)56(79)55(78)53(76)46(82-58)26-44(69)52(75)54(77)51(74)43(68)24-38(63)22-36(61)21-37(62)23-39(64)32(5)49(72)33(6)40(65)25-41(66)34(7)50(73)42(67)20-30(3)18-29(2)19-31(4)48(71)47-45(70)28-59(8)57(47)80/h19,29-30,32-44,46,49-56,60-69,71-79,81H,9-18,20-28H2,1-8H3 Key: VVBSMETZVCGSHB-UHFFFAOYSA-N
- SMILES: CCCCCCCCCCC(CC1(C(C(C(C(O1)CC(C(C(C(C(CC(CC(CC(CC(C(C)C(C(C)C(CC(C(C)C(C(CC(C)CC(C)/C=C(\C)/C(=C/2\C(=O)CN(C2=O)C)/O)O)O)O)O)O)O)O)O)O)O)O)O)O)O)O)O)O)O)O

Properties
Chemical formula	C_{58}H_{107}NO_{23}
Molar mass	1186.463 g/mol
- Except where otherwise noted, data are given for materials in their standard state (at 25 °C [77 °F], 100 kPa). verify (what is ?) Infobox references

Blasticidin A is an antibiotic produced by Streptomyces sp. that has antifungal and antibacterial activity. First synthesized in 1955, it was initially identified as a potential antifungal treatment for Magnaporthe grisea. Further research after discovery demonstrated in-vivo effectiveness against Pyricularia oryzae (the causative agent of Magnaporthe grisea) and Penicillium chrysogenum (the fungus which produces Penicillin) A later study found it to have fairly wide antifungal effect, demonstrating the ability to kill members of the Alternaria, Botrytis, Corticium, Gloeosporium, Glomerella, Macrosporium, Ophiobolus, and Piricularia genera with relatively low doses. The same study showed efficacy against some strains of Candida albicans and Rodotorula, and a narrower spectrum of antibacterial function; effective against Bacillus subtilis, Corynebacterium xerosis (a causative agent of several opportunistic infections), Pseudomonas solanacearam, Proteus vulgaris (a causative agents for Urinary tract infections), Shigella sonnei (one of the causative agents of Shigellosis) and Staphylococcus aureus.

Despite fairly wide efficacy, it is a poor candidate for human or vetrinary use due to the high toxcicity of similar coumpounds including Blasticidin S.
