= Deoxyribodipyrimidine endonucleosidase =

Identifiers
- EC no.: 3.2.2.17
- CAS no.: 75302-33-9

Databases
- IntEnz: IntEnz view
- BRENDA: BRENDA entry
- ExPASy: NiceZyme view
- KEGG: KEGG entry
- MetaCyc: metabolic pathway
- PRIAM: profile
- PDB structures: RCSB PDB PDBe PDBsum
Search
- PMC: articles
- PubMed: articles
- NCBI: proteins

Pyrimidine dimer DNA glycosylase

Identifiers
- Symbol: Pyr_excise
- Pfam: PF03013
- InterPro: IPR004260
- CATH: 2end
- SCOP2: 2end / SCOPe / SUPFAM
Available protein structures:
- Pfam: structures / ECOD
- PDB: RCSB PDB; PDBe; PDBj
- PDBsum: structure summary
- This is the only protein family known, as of January 2021, to confer this activity.

Deoxyribodipyrimidine endonucleosidase (EC 3.2.2.17, pyrimidine dimer DNA-glycosylase, endonuclease V, deoxyribonucleate pyrimidine dimer glycosidase, pyrimidine dimer DNA glycosylase, T4-induced UV endonuclease, PD-DNA glycosylase) is an enzyme with systematic name deoxy-D-ribocyclobutadipyrimidine polynucleotidodeoxyribohydrolase. This enzyme catalyses the following chemical reaction

Cleaves the N-glycosidic bond between the 5'-pyrimidine residue in cyclobutadipyrimidine (in DNA) and the corresponding deoxy-D-ribose residue

The only family of enzymes known to have this activity is represented by a phage T4 protein. This family also has AP lyase activity against the AP site produced by this reaction.
