= Mycofactocin =

Type of peptide

Mycofactocin (MFT) is a family of small molecules derived from a peptide of the type known as RiPP (ribosomally synthesized and post-translationally modified peptides), naturally occurring in many types of Mycobacterium. It was discovered in a bioinformatics study in 2011. All mycofactocins share a precursor in the form of premycofactocin (PMFT); they differ by the cellulose tail added. Being redox active, both PMFT and MFT have an oxidized dione (mycofactocinone) form and a reduced diol (mycofactocinol) form, respectively termed PMFTH_{2} and MFTH_{2}.

== Name ==
The name "mycofactocin" is derived from three words, the genus name "Mycobacterium" (across which it is nearly universal), "cofactor" because its presence in a genome predicts the co-occurrence of certain families of enzymes as if it is a cofactor they require, and "bacteriocin" because a radical SAM enzyme critical to its biosynthesis, MftC, is closely related to the key enzyme for the biosynthesis of subtilosin A, a bacteriocin, from its precursor peptide.

=== Nomenclature ===
An MFT with a glucose tail of n units is termed MFT-n; MFT-nH_{2} in the reduced form. An MFT with a 2-O-methylglucose is termed a methylmycofactocin (MMFT), with analogous numbering.

== Function ==
Mycofactocin is thought to play a role in redox pathways involving nicotinoproteins, enzymes with non-exchangeable bound nicotinamide adenine dinucleotide (NAD). This notion comes largely from comparative genomics work that highlighted the many parallels between mycofactocin and pyrroloquinoline quinone (PQQ). In both cases, maturation of the RiPP requires post-translational modification of a precursor peptide by a radical SAM enzyme, the system appears in very similar form in large numbers of species, the product appears to be used within the cell rather than exported, and several families of enzymes occur exclusively in bacteria with those systems. The number of putatively mycofactocin-dependent oxidoreductases encoded by a single genome can be quite large: at least 19 for Rhodococcus jostii RHA1, and 26 for the short chain dehydrogenase/reductase (SDR) family alone in Mycobacterium avium.

The enzyme LimC (Q9RA05), a nicotinoprotein carveol dehydrogenase (EC 1.1.1.n4), is shown to use both MFT and PMFT in vitro.

== Biosynthesis ==
External image
- Biosynthesis of mycofactocin, with illustration of the gene cluster and known steps.

The mycofactocin biosynthesis pathway is one of the most abundant of any RiPP system in the collection of bacterial genomes sequenced to date. However, its species distribution is heavily skewed towards the Actinomycetota, including Mycobacterium tuberculosis, which is the causative agent of tuberculosis and therefore the number one killer among bacterial pathogens of humans. The system is virtually absent from the normal human microbiome, although common in soil bacteria.

1. The biosynthesis of mycofactocin from its precursor peptide MftA begins with decarboxylation of the C-terminal tyrosine residue by the radical SAM enzyme MftC, with help from the precursor-binding protein MftB.
2. However, MftC appears next to perform a further modification to the MftA precursor peptide, an easily missed isomerization, by introducing a tyramine-valine cross-link, and consuming another S-adenosylmethionine in the process. The need for two modifications to MftA by MftC might explain the high degree of amino acid conservation in the last eight residues of MftA, as compared to the level of conservation seen for PqqA, precursor of PQQ.
3. Next, the creatininase homolog MftE releases the C-terminal dipeptide, VY* (valine-tyrosine, where * indicates that the tyrosine was previously modified).
4. Next, MftD converts the VY-derived dipeptide to premycofactocin, which has a biologically active redox center.
5. And lastly, the glycosyltransferase MftF builds onto premycofactocin a variably sized, beta-1,4 linked oligomeric chain of glucose (i.e. cellulose), sometimes substituting derivatives such as 2-O-methylglucose.

Mycofactocin, therefore, is not a single compound, but instead a mixture of closely related electron carriers that differ in the nature of their attached oligosaccharides.
