= Bam A =

Outer membrane protein

OMP insertion (BamComplex) porin

Identifiers
- Symbol: BamA
- Pfam: PF01103
- InterPro: IPR023707
- TCDB: 1.B.33
- OPM superfamily: 179
- OPM protein: 5ayw
Available protein structures:
- PDB: IPR023707 PF01103 (ECOD; PDBsum)
- AlphaFold: IPR023707; PF01103

BamA is a β-barrel, outer membrane protein found in Gram-negative bacteria and it is the main and vital component of the β-barrel assembly machinery (BAM) complex in those bacteria. BAM Complex consists of five components; BamB, BamC, BamD, BamE (all are lipoproteins) and BamA (Outer membrane protein). This complex is responsible in catalyzing folding and insertion of β-barrel proteins into the outer membrane of Gram-negative bacteria.

β-barrel membrane proteins can only be found in the outer membrane of Gram-negative bacteria and in organelles such as mitochondria and chloroplasts which were evolved from bacteria. In Gram-negative bacteria, outer membrane proteins are synthesized in the cytoplasm and then exported into the periplasm by Sec translocon machinery. Then they are escorted to the inner surface of the outer membrane by molecular chaperons. Finally those nascent proteins interact with BAM Complex and insert into the outer membrane as β-barrel proteins.

== Structure and function ==
According to the fully resolved BamA structure of N. gonorrhoeae, BamA has a large periplasmic domain connected to a transmembrane β-barrel domain which is made of 16 antiparallel β strands. There are five polypeptide translocation-associated (POTRA) domains extending from the barrel at the periplasmic domain of BamA. Current studies suggest that the four lipoproteins in the BAM Complex (BamB, BamC, BamD, BamE ) assemble on to the POTRA domains of BamA, making it the vital component of BAM Complex. The first and the last or 16th β-strands associate in closing the barrel. Extracellular loops (eL) eL4, eL6 and eL7 of the barrel forms a dome over the barrel by isolating the interior of the barrel from the extracellular space and interior of the BamA barrel is completely empty.

The external rim of the β-barrel has a narrow, reduced hydrophobic surface and it reduces lipid order and thickness of the membrane around the barrel. Transient separation of 1st and 16th β-strands which are associated in closing the barrel causes lateral opening of the barrel making a route from interior cavity of the BamA into the outer membrane. POTRA 5 domain of BamA sits close to the β–barrel and interacts with periplasmic loops (pL) pL3, pL4, pL5, pL7 and stabilize the closed conformation of the barrel. Swing movements of POTRA 5 domain and having no interactions with pLs make the opening of the barrel. Thus POTRA domains act as a gate to regulate the access into the interior of β–barrel. Hence there are three structural features associate with BamA that regulates the entry of β-barrel proteins into the outer membrane. First, open and closed conformation of BamA β-barrel. Second, the narrow and reduced hydrophobic rim on the surface of the β –barrel causes local destabilization of the outer membrane. Third, ability to undergo lateral opening of the barrel by transient separation of 1st and 16th β–barrel strands.
