= Pyranose dehydrogenase (acceptor) =

Identifiers
- EC no.: 1.1.99.29
- CAS no.: 190606-21-4

Databases
- IntEnz: IntEnz view
- BRENDA: BRENDA entry
- ExPASy: NiceZyme view
- KEGG: KEGG entry
- MetaCyc: metabolic pathway
- PRIAM: profile
- PDB structures: RCSB PDB PDBe PDBsum
Search
- PMC: articles
- PubMed: articles
- NCBI: proteins

Pyranose dehydrogenase (acceptor) (EC 1.1.99.29, pyranose dehydrogenase, pyranose-quinone oxidoreductase, quinone-dependent pyranose dehydrogenase, PDH) is an enzyme with systematic name pyranose:acceptor oxidoreductase. This enzyme catalyses the following chemical reaction

(1) a pyranose + acceptor $\rightleftharpoons$ a pyranos-2-ulose (or a pyranos-3-ulose or a pyranos-2,3-diulose) + reduced acceptor
(2) a pyranoside + acceptor $\rightleftharpoons$ a pyranosid-3-ulose (or a pyranosid-3,4-diulose) + reduced acceptor

This enzyme requires FAD. A number of aldoses and ketoses in pyranose form, as well as glycosides, gluco-oligosaccharides, sucrose and lactose can act as a donor.
