= Snapalysin =

Identifiers
- EC no.: 3.4.24.77
- CAS no.: 945859-47-2

Databases
- IntEnz: IntEnz view
- BRENDA: BRENDA entry
- ExPASy: NiceZyme view
- KEGG: KEGG entry
- MetaCyc: metabolic pathway
- PRIAM: profile
- PDB structures: RCSB PDB PDBe PDBsum
Search
- PMC: articles
- PubMed: articles
- NCBI: proteins

Snapalysin (EC 3.4.24.77, small neutral protease, SnpA gene product (Streptomyces lividans)) is an enzyme. This enzyme catalyses the following chemical reaction

Hydrolyses proteins with a preference for Tyr or Phe in the P1' position. Has no action on amino-acid p-nitroanilides

This enzyme belongs to the peptidase family M7.
