= Pyrroloquinoline quinone =

Names
- Systematic IUPAC name 4,5-Dioxo-4,5-dihydro-1H-pyrrolo[2,3-f]quinoline-2,7,9-tricarboxylic acid

Identifiers
CAS Number	72909-34-3
3D model (JSmol)	Interactive image
Beilstein Reference	3596812
ChEBI	CHEBI:18315
ChEMBL	ChEMBL1235421
ChemSpider	997
DrugBank	DB03205
EC Number	839-691-6
Gmelin Reference	56633
KEGG	C00113
MeSH	PQQ+Cofactor
PubChem CID	1024
UNII	47819QGH5L
CompTox Dashboard (EPA)	DTXSID3041162
- InChI: InChI=1S/C14H6N2O8/c17-10-4-2-6(14(23)24)15-8(4)7-3(12(19)20)1-5(13(21)22)16-9(7)11(10)18/h1-2,15H,(H,19,20)(H,21,22)(H,23,24) Key: MMXZSJMASHPLLR-UHFFFAOYSA-N; InChI=1/C14H6N2O8/c17-10-4-2-6(14(23)24)15-8(4)7-3(12(19)20)1-5(13(21)22)16-9(7)11(10)18/h1-2,15H,(H,19,20)(H,21,22)(H,23,24) Key: MMXZSJMASHPLLR-UHFFFAOYAP
- SMILES: c1c2c([nH]c1C(=O)O)-c3c(cc(nc3C(=O)C2=O)C(=O)O)C(=O)O

Properties
Chemical formula	C_{14}H_{6}N_{2}O_{8}
Molar mass	330.208 g·mol^{−1}
Density	1.963 g/cm^{3}

Hazards
Flash point	569.8 °C (1,057.6 °F; 842.9 K)
- Except where otherwise noted, data are given for materials in their standard state (at 25 °C [77 °F], 100 kPa). verify (what is ?) Infobox references

Pyrroloquinoline quinone (PQQ), also called methoxatin, is a redox cofactor and antioxidant.

Quinoprotein glucose dehydrogenase is used as a glucose sensor in bacteria. PQQ stimulates growth in bacteria.

== Occurrence ==
PQQ is found in a wide range of food. It is believed that it exists in food as its imidazole and oxazole derivatives. It is found in fruits and vegetables at 7–34 μg/kg, in legume seeds at 18.24 μg/kg, in fermented products at 60–800 μg/kg, in human milk at 140–180 μg/kg, in cow milk at 3.4 μg/kg, and in chicken egg yolk at 7 μg/kg. It is also found in casein, starch, and isolated soy protein at 10–100 μg/kg.

== History ==
It was discovered by Jens Gabriel Hauge in 1964 as the third redox cofactor after nicotinamide and flavin in bacteria (although he hypothesised that it was naphthoquinone). Anthony and Zatman also found the unknown redox cofactor in alcohol dehydrogenase. In 1979, Salisbury and colleagues as well as Duine and colleagues extracted this prosthetic group from methanol dehydrogenase of methylotrophs and identified its molecular structure. Adachi and colleagues discovered that PQQ was also found in Acetobacter.

== Biosynthesis ==
A novel aspect of PQQ is its biosynthesis in bacteria from a ribosomally translated precursor peptide, PqqA. (Note: UniProt: P27532) A glutamic acid and a tyrosine in PqqA are cross-linked by the radical SAM enzyme PqqE (Note: UniProt: P07782) with the help of PqqD (Note: UniProt: P07781) in the first step of PqqA modification. A protease then liberates the Glu-Tyr molecule from the peptide backbone. PqqB (Note: UniProt: P07779) oxidizes the 2 and 3 positions on the tyrosine ring, forming a quinone which quickly becomes AHQQ, finishing the pyridine ring. PqqC (Note: UniProt: P07780) then forms the final pyrrole ring.

AHQQ
3 O_{2}
2 H_{2}O_{2}
3 O_{2}
2 H_{2}O_{2}
pyrroloquinoline quinone
+ H_{2}O

Efforts to understand PQQ biosynthesis have contributed to broad interest in radical SAM enzymes and their ability to modify proteins, and an analogous radical SAM enzyme-dependent pathway has since been found that produces the putative electron carrier mycofactocin, using a valine and a tyrosine from the precursor peptide, MftA. (Note: UniProt: P9WJ81)

== Role in proteins ==
Quinoproteins generally embed the cofactor in a unique, six-bladed beta-barrel structure. Some examples also have a heme C prosthetic group and are termed quinohemoproteins. Although quinoproteins are mostly found in bacteria, a Coprinopsis cinerea (fungus) pyranose dehydrogenase has been shown to use PQQ in its crystal structure.

PQQ also appears to be essential in some other eukaryotic proteins, albeit not as the direct electron carrier. The mammalian lactate dehydrogenase requires PQQ to run but uses NADH as the direct redox cofactor. PQQ seems to speed up the reaction by catalyzing the oxidation of NADH via redox cycling.

== Controversy regarding role as vitamin ==
The scientific journal Nature published a 2003 paper by Kasahara and Kato that essentially stated that PQQ was a new vitamin, a cofactor required for the activity of an enzyme they believe to be involved in lysine metabolism (U26). In 2005, an article by Anthony and Felton that stated that the 2003 Kasahara Kato paper drew incorrect and unsubstantiated conclusions. Specifically, the databases used by the paper inappropriately labeled β-propeller sequences as PQQ-binding motifs.

An article by Bruce Ames in The Proceedings of the National Academy of Sciences in 2018 identified pyrroloquinoline quinone as a "longevity vitamin" not essential for immediate survival, but necessary for long-term health. Evidence of this identification include preclinical human studies, animal studies, and cell culture studies.

== See also ==
- L-aminoadipate-semialdehyde dehydrogenase, EC 1.2.1.31
