= Blasticidin S =

Names
- Preferred IUPAC name (2S,3S,6R)-3-{(3S)-3-Amino-5-[carbamimidoyl(methyl)amino]pentanamido}-6-(4-amino-2-oxopyrimidin-1(2H)-yl)-3,6-dihydro-2H-pyran-2-carboxylic acid

Identifiers
CAS Number	2079-00-7; 3513-03-9 (hydrochloride salt)
3D model (JSmol)	Interactive image
ChEBI	CHEBI:15353
ChEMBL	ChEMBL476894
ChemSpider	148673
ECHA InfoCard	100.109.057
KEGG	C02010
PubChem CID	258
UNII	83U64J9U23
CompTox Dashboard (EPA)	DTXSID0058015
- InChI: InChI=1S/C17H26N8O5/c1-24(16(20)21)6-4-9(18)8-12(26)22-10-2-3-13(30-14(10)15(27)28)25-7-5-11(19)23-17(25)29/h2-3,5,7,9-10,13-14H,4,6,8,18H2,1H3,(H3,20,21)(H,22,26)(H,27,28)(H2,19,23,29)/t9-,10-,13+,14-/m0/s1 Key: CXNPLSGKWMLZPZ-ZNIXKSQXSA-N; InChI=1/C17H26N8O5/c1-24(16(20)21)6-4-9(18)8-12(26)22-10-2-3-13(30-14(10)15(27)28)25-7-5-11(19)23-17(25)29/h2-3,5,7,9-10,13-14H,4,6,8,18H2,1H3,(H3,20,21)(H,22,26)(H,27,28)(H2,19,23,29)/t9-,10-,13+,14-/m0/s1 Key: CXNPLSGKWMLZPZ-ZNIXKSQXBS
- SMILES: O=C1\N=C(\N)/C=C\N1[C@@H]\2O[C@H](C(=O)O)[C@H](/C=C/2)NC(=O)C[C@@H](N)CCN(C(=[N@H])N)C

Properties
Chemical formula	C_{17}H_{26}N_{8}O_{5}
Molar mass	422.44 g/mol
- Except where otherwise noted, data are given for materials in their standard state (at 25 °C [77 °F], 100 kPa). verify (what is ?) Infobox references

Blasticidin S is an antibiotic that is used in biology research for selecting cells in cell culture. Cells of interest can express the blasticidin resistance genes BSD or bsr, and can then survive treatment with the antibiotic. Blasticidin S is a nucleoside analogue antibiotic, resembling the nucleoside cytidine. Blasticidin works against human cells, fungi, and bacteria, all by disrupting protein translation. It was originally described by Japanese researchers in the 1950s seeking antibiotics for rice blast fungus.

== Chemistry ==
Color overlay showing constituent parts of Blasticidin S

A nucleoside analog, blasticidin S resembles the nucleoside cytidine. The chemical structure consists of a cytosine molecule, linked to a glucuronic acid-derived ring, linked in turn to the peptide N-methyl β-arginine.

== Uses ==
Blasticidin S is widely used in cell culture for selecting and maintaining genetically manipulated cells. Cells of interest express the blasticidin S resistance genes BSD or bsr, and can then survive blasticidin S being added to the culture media. Blasticidin S is typically used at 2–300 micrograms per milliliter of media, depending on the type of cell being grown.

== Mechanism of action ==
Blasticidin prevents the growth of both eukaryotic and prokaryotic cells. It works by inhibiting termination step of translation and peptide bond formation (to lesser extent) by the ribosome. This means that cells can no longer produce new proteins through translation of mRNA. It is competitive with puromycin suggesting a highly similar binding site.

== Biosynthesis ==
The first step in blasticidin S biosynthesis is the combination of UDP-glucuronic acid with cytosine to form cytosylglucuronic acid (CGA). Given the product name, the enzyme that performs this combination is called CGA synthase.

Cosmid cloning experiments from the Blasticidin S producer Streptomyces griseochromogenes, followed by evaluation of the putative biosynthetic gene cluster via heterologous reconstitution of Blasticidin S production in Streptomyces lividans, indicated that a 20 Kbp gene cluster with 19 genes, plus possibly a peptidase outside the gene cluster that acts on the final leucylblasticidin S (LBS) intermediate, was sufficient for reconstitution of Blasticidin S biosynthesis.

== Resistance genes ==
Resistance to blasticidin S can be conferred by either of two deaminases: BSD, originally isolated from Aspergillus terreus or bsr, isolated from Bacillus cereus. Both deaminases work by modifying blasticidin S directly, replacing the amine on the cytosine ring with a hydroxyl group, resulting in the inactive deaminohydroxy-blasticin S.

bsr and BSD are the most commonly used resistance genes. The proteins produced from these genes enable the cells carrying them to produce proteins in the presence of blasticidin.

== History ==
In the 1950s, a drug screening program was designed in Japan to discover a new antibiotic that prevents blast disease by the fungus Magnaporthe grisea.
