= KLB (disambiguation) =

KLB is a rock group/boy band from Brazil.

KLB may also refer to:

- KLB (2000 album), their debut album
- Kalabo Airport, Zambia
- Kenya Literature Bureau, a Kenyan publisher
- Kiliwa language
- Kinlochbervie Camanachd Club, a Scottish shinty club
- Kiraoli railway station, Agra district, Uttar Pradesh, India
- KLB Club, a name adopted by Allied airmen at Buchenwald concentration camp
- Klebsazolicin, a peptide antibiotic
- β-klotho, encoded by the KLB gene
- Keisha Lance Bottoms, 60th mayor of Atlanta and current governor-elect of Georgia
