= Lariocidin =

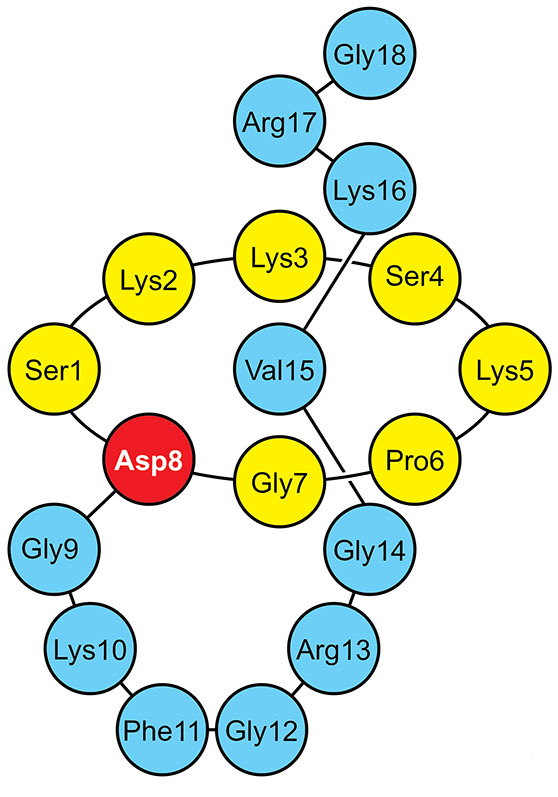
- Amino acid sequence of lariocidin

Names
- Other names LAR

Identifiers
3D model (JSmol)	Interactive image
- InChI: InChI=1S/C81H139N29O22/c1-46(2)66(78(131)105-53(24-9-14-32-85)73(126)102-49(27-17-35-92-81(89)90)68(121)97-43-65(118)119)109-64(117)42-93-67(120)48(26-16-34-91-80(87)88)98-61(114)39-94-69(122)55(37-47-19-4-3-5-20-47)107-71(124)50(21-6-11-29-82)99-62(115)40-95-70(123)56-38-60(113)101-57(44-111)75(128)104-51(22-7-12-30-83)72(125)103-52(23-8-13-31-84)74(127)108-58(45-112)76(129)106-54(25-10-15-33-86)79(132)110-36-18-28-59(110)77(130)96-41-63(116)100-56/h3-5,19-20,46,48-59,66,111-112H,6-18,21-45,82-86H2,1-2H3,(H,93,120)(H,94,122)(H,95,123)(H,96,130)(H,97,121)(H,98,114)(H,99,115)(H,100,116)(H,101,113)(H,102,126)(H,103,125)(H,104,128)(H,105,131)(H,106,129)(H,107,124)(H,108,127)(H,109,117)(H,118,119)(H4,87,88,91)(H4,89,90,92)/t48-,49-,50-,51-,52-,53-,54-,55-,56-,57-,58-,59-,66-/m0/s1 Key: ILXKJMQHKWNWKX-BYIPITHXSA-N
- SMILES: N3[C@@]([H])(CO)C(=O)N[C@@]([H])(CCCCN)C(=O)N[C@@]([H])(CCCCN)C(=O)N[C@@]([H])(CO)C(=O)N[C@@]([H])(CCCCN)C(=O)N1[C@@]([H])(CCC1)C(=O)NCC(=O)N[C@@]([H])(CC(=O)3)C(=O)NCC(=O)N[C@@]([H])(CCCCN)C(=O)N[C@@]([H])(Cc1ccccc1)C(=O)NCC(=O)N[C@@]([H])(CCCNC(=N)N)C(=O)NCC(=O)N[C@@]([H])(C(C)C)C(=O)N[C@@]([H])(CCCCN)C(=O)N[C@@]([H])(CCCNC(=N)N)C(=O)NCC(=O)O

Properties
Chemical formula	C_{81}H_{139}N_{29}O_{22}
Molar mass	1871.184 g·mol^{−1}
- Except where otherwise noted, data are given for materials in their standard state (at 25 °C [77 °F], 100 kPa). Infobox references

Lariocidin (abbreviated as LAR) is a naturally occurring lasso peptide antibiotic. It is the first lasso peptide reported to inhibit protein synthesis in bacteria through interactions with the ribosome. LAR kills a broad spectrum of bacteria, including multiple human pathogens that are classified as priority pathogens by the World Health Organization such as Acinetobacter baumannii, Klebsiella pneumoniae, Staphylococcus aureus, and Escherichia coli.

== Discovery ==
Lariocidin was identified as part of a natural-product screening program led by researchers at McMaster University. The producer organism, Paenibacillus sp. M2, was isolated from a backyard soil sample from the garden in Hamilton, ON, Canada; researchers cultivated soil bacteria under conditions intended to enrich slower-growing organisms and screened culture extracts for antibacterial activity.

== Antibacterial activity ==
Lariocidin exhibits broad-spectrum antimicrobial activity in vitro against a range of clinically relevant bacteria, including Gram-positive (Staphylococcus aureus), Gram-negative (Acinetobacter baumannii, Klebsiella pneumoniae, Escherichia coli), and mycobacteria. Lariocidin is efficient in nutrient-limited conditions that are reflective of the host environment bacteria encounter during an infection and active against strains resistant to many existing antibiotic classes.

In mouse infection experiments, lariocidin demonstrated efficacy in a neutropenic thigh model of multidrug-resistant A. baumannii infection, with significant reduction of bacterial burden compared with controls. The initial preclinical data indicated a favorable therapeutic window and no observed cytotoxicity in human cell assays, supporting further investigation as a lead compound.

== Biosynthesis ==
Lariocidin is a 18 amino acid-long peptide with the sequence SKKSKPGDGKFGRGVKRG, whose N-terminal serine forms an isopeptide bond with the side chain of aspartate 8 and the C-terminal tail is threaded through the loop formed. Lariocidin belongs to the lasso peptide family of the ribosomally synthesized and post-translationally modified peptide (RiPP) class of natural products.

Lariocidin biosynthetic gene cluster (BGC) in the genome of the producer encodes a precursor peptide (LrcA), the enzymes required for its modification (LrcB1B2C), export pumps (LrcD1D2), and a self-resistance acetyltransferase LrcE. The biosynthetic machinery installs a characteristic isopeptide bond that creates the macrocycle and generates the threaded, “lasso” topology. In the same BGC researchers identified a peptidase LrcF, whose activity is required for the formation of the LAR-B variant - an internally cyclized derivative of LAR. Heterologous expression of the lariocidin BGC in model host and targeted gene deletion supported the proposed functions of the encoded proteins.

== Uptake ==
The majority of known lasso peptides require specific peptide transporters to be internalized into the bacterial cell, which ultimately leads to a narrow spectrum of action. Unlike those, lariocidin does not require any pumps to get inside the bacterial cell. Its uptake relies on its strong positive charge and depends on the potential of the cell membrane. In part this explains the broad spectrum of lariocidin bioactivity, unusual for lasso peptides.

== Mechanism of action ==
Lariocidin inhibits bacterial translation, unlike other studied antimicrobial lasso peptides, which are targeting RNA polymerase (e.g. microcin J25, capistruin), or lipid II biosynthesis (e.g. siamycin-I). Lariocidin binds to the small 30S ribosomal subunit forming interactions with 16S rRNA. It inhibits the translocation stage of the ribosome elongation cycle by preventing the movement of the ribosome to the next codon. In addition, lariocidin interacts with the incoming A-site tRNA, which leads to miscoding that can be the major mechanism of lariocidin action in lower ranges of its concentration.

== Mechanism of self-resistance ==
Lariocidin-producing Paenibacillus sp. M2 encodes a GCN5-related N-acetyltransferase LrcE. Its gene is a part of the lariocidin biosynthetic gene cluster. LrcE specifically acetylates the side chain of LAR's Lys16, which reduces compound's affinity to the binding site on the ribosome. Similarly acting acetyltransferases confer resistance to LAR-like lasso peptides triculamin (TriT) and gelatinamin (GelT).

== See also ==
- Ribosomally synthesized and post-translationally modified peptides
- Ribosome
