= Isopeptidase =

An isopeptidase is a protease enzyme that hydrolyzes isopeptide bonds, or amide bonds that occur outside the main chain in a polypeptide chain.

== In protein degradation ==
Isopeptide bonds occur in the linkage of protein amino acid side chains to proteins such as ubiquitin and SUMO in the protein degradation pathway. In eukaryotes, enzymes with isopeptidase activity are often involved in this pathway; all five classes of deubiquitinating enzymes have isopeptidase activity. Examples include Ulp1 peptidase and USP5 (formerly known as isopeptidase T).

== In lasso peptide processing ==
Isopeptidases have also been identified in prokaryotes that express lasso peptides, or peptides with a knotted conformation established by the presence of a non-main-chain linkage between an acidic amino acid and the peptide's N-terminus to form the knot. (Some lasso peptides also have topological complexity conferred by disulfide bonds.) Isopeptidase enzymes linearize the peptides by cleaving the isopeptide bond.
