= Linusorb =

Type of peptide

Linusorbs are small biologically active cyclic peptides synthesized in flaxseed (Linum usitatissimum) from two ribosome-derived precursors. The name is derived from Linum usitatissimum orbitide.

The molecules are very stable, not easily digested and stiff.

== Nomenclature for Linusorb: [1–#-NαC],[#-Xaa,#-Xaa]-linusorb # ==
The International Union of Pure and Applied Chemistry (IUPAC) Nomenclature for Natural Products supports the use of taxonomic names for the development of compound trivial names, while UniProt utilizes standard organism names as well as organism mnemonics in the naming of proteins. Linusorb product name according to Shim et al. (2015).

Linkage [1–#-NαC] Occurs between amino acid 1 and amino acid “#” through the α-amino group that a N-C cyclization of the core peptide. The en dash (–) is used and placed in square brackets.

Modifications [#-Xaa,#-Xaa] The notation utilizes a prefix code of 3, 4 characters. Specifies the position and type of modified amino acids in the peptide. Each modified amino acid is identified by its position in the core peptide sequence using abbreviations found in UniProt and IUPAC. A comma separates multiple post-translational modifications.

Taxonomic name abbreviation -linus The first three letters of the genus name and first two letters of the species name are used to identify the origin of the orbitide. Based on the list of species maintained by UniProt (http://www.uniprot.org/docs/speclist).

Common suffix (-orb) Short for orbitide.

Amino acid residue numbering (#) Residue numbering begins at the N-terminal-most amino acid residue of the orbitide, based on DNA sequence. Notation for any post-translational modifications start with the lowest number and proceed to the highest number. Where multiple identical modifications are present, they are grouped together as illustrated for Met groups in [1–8-NαC],[1,3-(R_{s},S_{s})-MetO]-linusorb A1 (Table 1 and Figure 1; formerly cyclolinopeptide G, CLG). This more descriptive name for CLG reflects the complexity of fully and appropriately naming this compound as it contains the chiral amino acid methionine S-oxide. Clearly, what was formerly recognized as CLG is actually four distinct compounds. New full names for all “cyclolinopeptide” variants are suggested in Table 1.

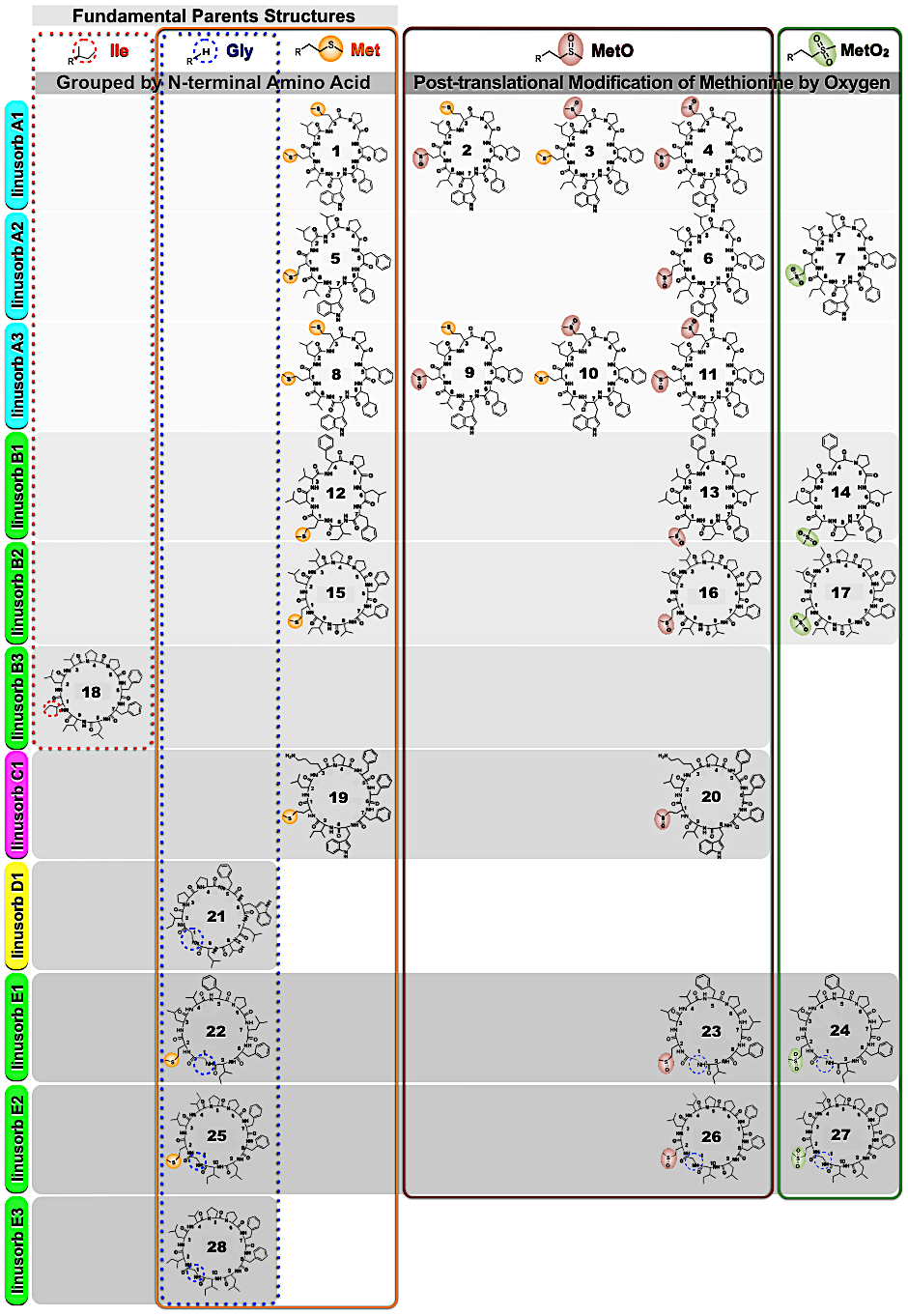
Figure 1. Structures of Linusorbs A−E

=== Table 1. Elements of Linusorb Names ===
Proposed linusorb name^{a}	Literature name^{b} (code)	Amino acid sequence (NαC-)^{c}	Gene
[1–8-NαC]-linusorb A1	CLM (1)	Met-Leu-Met-Pro-Phe-Phe-Trp-Ile	AFSQ01025165.1
[1–8-NαC],[1-(R_{s})-MetO]-linusorb A1		[(R_{s})-MetO]-Leu-Met-Pro-Phe-Phe-Trp-Ile	AFSQ01025165.1
[1–8-NαC],[1-(S_{s})-MetO]-linusorb A1		[(S_{s})-MetO]-Leu-Met-Pro-Phe-Phe-Trp-Ile	AFSQ01025165.1
[1–8-NαC],[1-(R_{s},S_{s})-MetO]-linusorb A1	CLH (2)	[(R_{s},S_{s})-MetO]-Leu-Met-Pro-Phe-Phe-Trp-Ile	AFSQ01025165.1
[1–8-NαC],[3-(R_{s})-MetO]-linusorb A1		Met-Leu-[(R_{s})-MetO]-Pro-Phe-Phe-Trp-Ile	AFSQ01025165.1
[1–8-NαC],[3-(S_{s})-MetO]-linusorb A1		Met-Leu-[(S_{s})-MetO]-Pro-Phe-Phe-Trp-Ile	AFSQ01025165.1
[1–8-NαC],[3-(R_{s},S_{s})-MetO]-linusorb A1	CLN (3)	Met-Leu-[(R_{s},S_{s})-MetO]-Pro-Phe-Phe-Trp-Ile	AFSQ01025165.1
[1–8-NαC],[1,3-(R_{s},R_{s})-MetO]-linusorb A1		[(R_{s})-MetO]-Leu-[(R_{s})-MetO]-Pro-Phe-Phe-Trp-Ile	AFSQ01025165.1
[1–8-NαC],[1,3-(S_{s},S_{s})-MetO]-linusorb A1		[(S_{s})-MetO]-Leu-[(S_{s})-MetO]-Pro-Phe-Phe-Trp-Ile	AFSQ01025165.1
[1–8-NαC],[1-(R_{s})-MetO,3-(S_{s})-MetO]-linusorb A1		[(R_{s})-MetO]-Leu-[(S_{s})-MetO]-Pro-Phe-Phe-Trp-Ile	AFSQ01025165.1
[1–8-NαC],[1-(S_{s})-MetO,3-(R_{s})-MetO]-linusorb A1		[(S_{s})-MetO]-Leu-[(R_{s})-MetO]-Pro-Phe-Phe-Trp-Ile	AFSQ01025165.1
[1–8-NαC],[1,3-(R_{s},S_{s})-MetO]-linusorb A1	CLG (4)	[(R_{s},S_{s})-MetO]-Leu-[(R_{s},S_{s})-MetO]-Pro-Phe-Phe-Trp-Ile	AFSQ01025165.1
[1–8-NαC]-linusorb A2	CLO (5)	Met-Leu-Leu-Pro-Phe-Phe-Trp-Ile	AFSQ01025165.1
[1–8-NαC],[1-(R_{s})-MetO]-linusorb A2		[(R_{s})-MetO]-Leu-Leu-Pro-Phe-Phe-Trp-Ile	AFSQ01025165.1
[1–8-NαC],[1-(S_{s})-MetO]-linusorb A2		[(S_{s})-MetO]-Leu-Leu-Pro-Phe-Phe-Trp-Ile	AFSQ01025165.1
[1–8-NαC],[1-(R_{s},S_{s})-MetO]-linusorb A2	CLD (6)	[(R_{s},S_{s})-MetO]-Leu-Leu-Pro-Phe-Phe-Trp-Ile	AFSQ01025165.1
[1–8-NαC],[1-MetO_{2}]-linusorb A2	1-Msn-CLD (7)	MetO_{2}-Leu-Leu-Pro-Phe-Phe-Trp-Ile	AFSQ01025165.1
[1–8-NαC]-linusorb A3	CLL (8)	Met-Leu-Met-Pro-Phe-Phe-Trp-Val	AFSQ01025165.1
[1–8-NαC],[1-(R_{s})-MetO]-linusorb A3		[(R_{s})-MetO]-Leu-Met-Pro-Phe-Phe-Trp-Val	AFSQ01025165.1
[1–8-NαC],[1-(S_{s})-MetO]-linusorb A3		[(S_{s})-MetO]-Leu-Met-Pro-Phe-Phe-Trp-Val	AFSQ01025165.1
[1–8-NαC],[1-(R_{s},S_{s})-MetO]-linusorb A3	[1–8-NαC],[1-MetO]-CLF (9)	[(R_{s},S_{s})-MetO]-Leu-Met-Pro-Phe-Phe-Trp-Val	AFSQ01025165.1
[1–8-NαC],[3-(R_{s})-MetO]-linusorb A3		Met-Leu-[(R_{s})-MetO]-Pro-Phe-Phe-Trp-Val	AFSQ01025165.1
[1–8-NαC],[3-(S_{s})-MetO]-linusorb A3		Met-Leu-[(S_{s})-MetO]-Pro-Phe-Phe-Trp-Val	AFSQ01025165.1
[1–8-NαC],[3-(R_{s},S_{s})-MetO]-linusorb A3	CLI (10)	Met-Leu-[(R_{s},S_{s})-MetO]-Pro-Phe-Phe-Trp-Val	AFSQ01025165.1
[1–8-NαC],[1-(R_{s})-MetO,3-(R_{s})-MetO]-linusorb A3		[(R_{s})-MetO]-Leu-[(R_{s})-MetO]-Pro-Phe-Phe-Trp-Val	AFSQ01025165.1
[1–8-NαC],[1-(S_{s})-MetO,3-(S_{s})-MetO]-linusorb A3		[(S_{s})-MetO]-Leu-[(S_{s})-MetO]-Pro-Phe-Phe-Trp-Val	AFSQ01025165.1
[1–8-NαC],[1-(R_{s})-MetO,3-(S_{s})-MetO]-linusorb A3		[(R_{s})-MetO]-Leu-[(S_{s})-MetO]-Pro-Phe-Phe-Trp-Val	AFSQ01025165.1
[1–8-NαC],[1-(S_{s})-MetO,3-(R_{s})-MetO]-linusorb A3		[(S_{s})-MetO]-Leu-[(R_{s})-MetO]-Pro-Phe-Phe-Trp-Val	AFSQ01025165.1
[1–8-NαC],[1,3-(R_{s},S_{s})-MetO]-linusorb A3	CLF (11)	[(R_{s},S_{s})-MetO]-Leu-[(R_{s},S_{s})-MetO]-Pro-Phe-Phe-Trp-Val	AFSQ01025165.1
[1–8-NαC]-linusorb B1	CLP (12)	Met-Leu-Val-Phe-Pro-Leu-Phe-Ile	AFSQ01016651.1
[1–8-NαC],[1-(R_{s})-MetO]-linusorb B1		[(R_{s})-MetO]-Leu-Val-Phe-Pro-Leu-Phe-Ile	AFSQ01016651.1
[1–8-NαC],[1-(S_{s})-MetO]-linusorb B1		[(S_{s})-MetO]-Leu-Val-Phe-Pro-Leu-Phe-Ile	AFSQ01016651.1
[1–8-NαC],[1-(R_{s},S_{s})-MetO]-linusorb B1	CLE (13)	[(R_{s},S_{s})-MetO]-Leu-Val-Phe-Pro-Leu-Phe-Ile	AFSQ01016651.1
[1–8-NαC],[1-MetO_{2}]-linusorbB1	CLJ (14)	MetO_{2}-Leu-Val-Phe-Pro-Leu-Phe-Ile	AFSQ01016651.1
[1–9-NαC]-linusorb B2	CLB (15)	Met-Leu-Ile-Pro-Pro-Phe-Phe-Val-Ile	AFSQ01016651.1
[1–9-NαC],[1-(R_{s})-MetO]-linusorb B2		[(R_{s})-MetO]-Leu-Ile-Pro-Pro-Phe-Phe-Val-Ile	AFSQ01016651.1
[1–9-NαC],[1-(S_{s})-MetO]-linusorb B2		[(S_{s})-MetO]-Leu-Ile-Pro-Pro-Phe-Phe-Val-Ile	AFSQ01016651.1
[1–9-NαC],[1-(R_{s},S_{s})-MetO]-linusorb B2	CLC (16)	[(R_{s},S_{s})-MetO]-Leu-Ile-Pro-Pro-Phe-Phe-Val-Ile	AFSQ01016651.1
[1–9-NαC],[1-MetO_{2}]-linusorb B2	CLK (17)	MetO_{2}-Leu-Ile-Pro-Pro-Phe-Phe-Val-Ile	AFSQ01016651.1
[1–9-NαC]-linusorb B3	CLA (18)	Ile-Leu-Val-Pro-Pro-Phe-Phe-Leu-Ile	AFSQ01016651.1
[1–9-NαC]-linusorb C1	[1–9-NαC]-CLQ (19)	Met-Leu-Lys-Pro-Phe-Phe-Phe-Trp-Ile	Gene^{d}
[1–9-NαC],[1-(R_{s},S_{s})-MetO]-linusorb C1	[1–9-NαC],[1-MetO]-CLQ (20)	[(R_{s},S_{s})-MetO]-Leu-Lys-Pro-Phe-Phe-Phe-Trp-Ile	Gene^{d}
[1–9-NαC]-linusorb D1	[1–9-NαC]-CLS (21)	Gly-Ile-Pro-Pro-Phe-Trp-Leu-Thr-Leu	Genes^{e}
[1–9-NαC]-linusorb E1	[1–9-NαC]-CLX (22)	Gly-Met-Leu-Val-Phe-Pro-Leu-Phe-Ile	Gene^{f}
[1–9-NαC],[2-(R_{s},S_{s})-MetO]-linusorb E1	[1–9-NαC],[2-MetO]-CLX (23)	Gly-[(R_{s},S_{s})-MetO]-Leu-Val-Phe-Pro-Leu-Phe-Ile	Gene^{f}
[1–9-NαC],[2-MetO_{2}]-linusorb E1	(24)	Gly-MetO_{2}-Leu-Val-Phe-Pro-Leu-Phe-Ile	Gene^{f}
[1–10-NαC]-linusorb E2	[1–10-NαC]-CLV (25)	Gly-Met-Leu-Ile-Pro-Pro-Phe-Phe-Val-Ile	Gene^{f}
[1–10-NαC],[2-(R_{s},S_{s})-MetO]-linusorb E2	[1–10-NαC],[2-MetO]-CLV (26)	Gly-[(R_{s},S_{s})-MetO]-Leu-Ile-Pro-Pro-Phe-Phe-Val-Ile	Gene^{f}
[1–10-NαC],[2-MetO_{2}]-linusorb E2	(27)	Gly-MetO_{2}-Leu-Ile-Pro-Pro-Phe-Phe-Val-Ile	Gene^{f}
[1–10-NαC]-linusorb E3	[1–10-NαC]-CLU (28)	Gly-Ile-Leu-Val-Pro-Pro-Phe-Phe-Leu-Ile	Gene^{f}

Notes

^{a}Proposed orbitide name: [1–#-NαC], linkage occurs between amino acid 1 and amino acid “#” through the α-amino group that a N-C cyclization of the core peptide. Use the en dash (–) as in ranges and place the square brackets; [#-Xaa,#-Xaa], methionine S-oxide has a chiral sulfur. Two diastereomers are designated as S_{s} and R_{s}. Identical amino acids substituents are numbered and grouped; lin-, Genus name is recognized by three letters or from UniProt list; -us-, species name is recognized by 2 letters or name from UniProt list; -orb, common suffix for orbitide.

^{b}Name used in first literature description.

^{c}The methionine residues of amino acid sequences are highlighted in Figure 1. Abbreviations of the methionine residues are MetO for methionine S-oxide and MetO_{2} for methionine S,S-dioxide.

^{d}AFSQ01016651.1.

^{e}AFSQ01011783.1 and AFSQ01009065.1.

^{f}AFSQ01016651.1.
