= KLB (2000 album) =

KLB (2000)

Studio album by KLB
- Released: June 1, 2000
- Recorded: 1999, 2000
- Genre: Pop, Dance
- Length: 49:06
- Label: Sony Music, Columbia
- Producer: Piska

KLB chronology
KLB (2000) (2000)	KLB (2001)

KLB, launched in 2000, is the first studio album by pop trio KLB, is best known as KLB (2000) and is one of the most successful albums of the band by the number of copies sold and hit singles on the radio. It was produced by composer Piska, also responsible for most of the compositions on the disc. In this album has the first four of the main successes of KLB, which are: "A dor desse amor", "Ela Não Está Aqui", "Estou em suas mãos" and "Por que tem que ser assim?". KLB (2000) was the second best selling album in Brazil in 2000, KLB (2000) marks achieved gold record, platinum, double platinum, triple platinum disc and then diamond disc for selling more than 1 million copies. Their ranges of success are "A dor desse amor", "Estou em suas mãos", "Por que tem que ser assim?" and "Ainda Vou Te Encontrar" (composed by Kiko, in honor of a girlfriend who died in a car accident)

== Tracks ==
1. Ficar Por Ficar
2. Estou em suas mãos
3. Por Que tem que ser assim?
4. Tudo Bem
5. Ela Não Está Aqui
6. Meu Primeiro Amor
7. Muito Estranho (Cuida bem de mim)
8. Uma noite de amor
9. A dor desse amor
10. Ainda vou te encontrar
11. Quero ficar com você
12. Te amo demais
13. O que vai ser de nós dois?
