= KLB =

Brazilian band

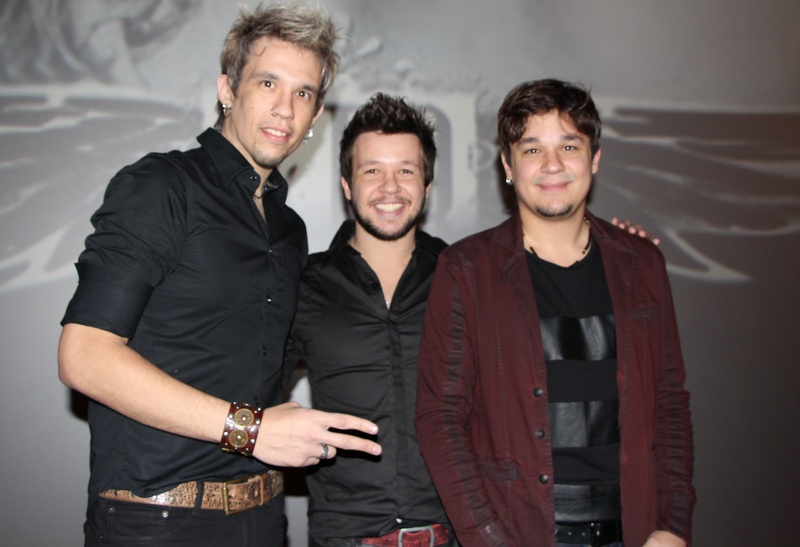
- Left to right: Kiko, Bruno and Leandro in 2015

Background information
- Origin: São Paulo, Brazil
- Genres: Pop; rock; dance-pop; teen pop
- Years active: 2000–present
- Members: Franco Finato Scornavacca; Leandro Finato Scornavacca; Bruno Finato Scornavacca
- Website: Official website

KLB is a pop band from Brazil. The band consists of three brothers from São Paulo: Kiko (Franco Finato Scornavacca), Leandro Finato Scornavacca and Bruno Finato Scornavacca. KLB stands for each brother's name.

== Music career ==
The brothers began their career in 1996, with a group named "The Fenders" and after "Neon" and was composed by the three brothers and the pop singers Wanessa Camargo and Camila, who left the group.

KLB started in 2000 when for the first time, the brothers Kiko, Leandro and Bruno, performed at Anhembi, São Paulo, in an award, contemplating their father Franco Scornavacca, who was receiving the "Best Brazilian Manager of the 90s. Their first single "A Dor Desse Amor" charted #1 in Brazil.

The group's debut album sold more than 1.5 million copies in less than eight months. In 2002, they renewed their contract with Sony Music label and became one of the first Brazilian artists to record a DVD, which sold over thirty thousand copies. With more than 1,200 registered fan clubs (some of whom had more than 2,000 members), Kiko, Leandro and Bruno consolidated their careers in the countre.

Their total sales exceeded 7 million records, with one of their albums alone selling over one million copies.

The band owns a studio in São Paulo, KLB Studios, one of the largest recording studios in Brazil. Paul McCartney recorded tracks for his album Egypt Station at KLB Studios.

== Discography ==
Studio Albums

Title	Details
KLB	Released: May 22, 2000; Label: Sony; Format: CD
KLB 2001	Released: May 1, 2001; Label: Sony; Format: CD
KLB 2002	Released: May 1, 2002; Label: Sony; Format: CD
KLB 2004	Released: September 30, 2004; Label: Sony; Format: CD, download digital
Obsessão	Released: November 21, 2005; Label: Universal Music Group; Format: CD, download digital
Bandas	Released: July 9, 2007; Label: Universal Music Group; Format: CD, download digital
Entre o Céu e a Terra	Released: November 25, 2008; Label: Universal Music Group; Format: CD, download digital
3D	Released: November 30, 2011; Label: Radar Records; Format: CD, download digital

Live Albums

Title	Details
KLB: Ao Vivo	Released: December 22, 2002; Label: Sony; Format: CD

EPs

Title	Details
Um Novo Tempo	Released: 2015; Label: Radar Records; Format: CD, download digital

Collected

Title	Details
Só Sucessos Nº 1	Released: June 1, 2003; Label: Sony; Format: CD
Sem Limite	Released: September 2, 2008; Label: Sony; Format: CD, download digital

== Singles ==
List of singles, with positions in the selected charts
Title	Year	Charts	Album
Title	Year	BRA Hot 100	Album
"A Dor Desse Amor"	2000	1	KLB
"Estou em Suas Mãos"	2000	1	KLB
"Ela não Está Aqui" (version of I'd Love You to Want Me by Lobo)	2000	1	KLB
"Por Que Tem Que Ser Assim?"	2000	2	KLB
"Minha Timidez"	2001	1	KLB (2001)
"Te Amar Ainda Mais"	2001	2	KLB (2001)
"Olhar 43"	2001	1	KLB (2001)
"Seu Nome"	2001	18	KLB (2001)
"A Cada Dez Palavras"	2002	1	KLB (2002)
"Só Dessa Vez"	2002	1	KLB (2002)
"Por Causa de Você"	2002	1	KLB: Ao Vivo
"Nunca Deixe de Sonhar" (ft. Rouge)	2003	18	KLB: Ao Vivo
"Não Olhe Assim"	2003	1	Só Sucessos Nº 1
"Chuvas de Verão"	2004	6	Só Sucessos Nº 1
"A Ilha"	2004	1	KLB (2004)
"Carolina"	2005	6	KLB (2004)
"Um Anjo" (version of Angels by Robbie Williams)	2005	2	Obsessão
"Obsessão" (ft. Pregador Luo)	2006	2	Obsessão
"Não Vou Chorar"	2006	41	Obsessão
"Todo Azul do Mar"	2007	30	Bandas
"Não Devo Mais Ficar"	2007	71	Bandas
"Amor de Verdade"	2008	29	Entre o Céu e a Terra
"Vai"	2011	52	3D
"Quando o Amanhã Chegar"	2011	33	3D
"Vão Passando os Minutos"	2014	18	Um Novo Tempo

== As featured artist ==
List of singles, with positions in the selected charts
Title	Year	Charts	Album
Title	Year	BRA Hot 100	Album
"Jesus Verbo, Não Substantivo" (Padre Marcelo Rossi ft. Artistas pela Paz)	2000	83	—N/a
"Um Sonho a Dois" (Joanna ft. KLB)	2003	39	Todo Acústico
"A Garota de Ontem" (Zezé Di Camargo & Luciano ft. KLB)	2008	44	—N/a
"—" denotes a recording that did not chart or was not released in that territory.

== Promotional singles ==
List of singles, with positions in the selected charts
Title	Year	Charts	Album
Title	Year	BRA Hot 100	Album
"Sensação"	2004	57	Só Sucessos Nº 1
"Estou Morrendo aos Poucos"	2009	—	Entre o Céu e a Terra
"—" denotes a recording that did not chart or was not released in that territory.
