= Ulp1 peptidase =

Class of enzymes

Identifiers
- EC no.: 3.4.22.68

Databases
- IntEnz: IntEnz view
- BRENDA: BRENDA entry
- ExPASy: NiceZyme view
- KEGG: KEGG entry
- MetaCyc: metabolic pathway
- PRIAM: profile
- PDB structures: RCSB PDB PDBe PDBsum
Search
- PMC: articles
- PubMed: articles
- NCBI: proteins

Ulp1 peptidase (EC 3.4.22.68, Smt3-protein conjugate proteinase, Ubl-specific protease 1, Ulp1, Ulp1 endopeptidase, Ulp1 protease) is an enzyme. This enzyme catalyses the following chemical reaction

Hydrolysis of the alpha-linked peptide bond in the sequence Gly-Gly-!Ala-Thr-Tyr at the C-terminal end of the small ubiquitin-like modifier (SUMO) propeptide, Smt3

The enzyme from Saccharomyces cerevisiae can also recognize small ubiquitin-like modifier 1 (SUMO-1) from human.
