= YcaO =

YcaO-like family
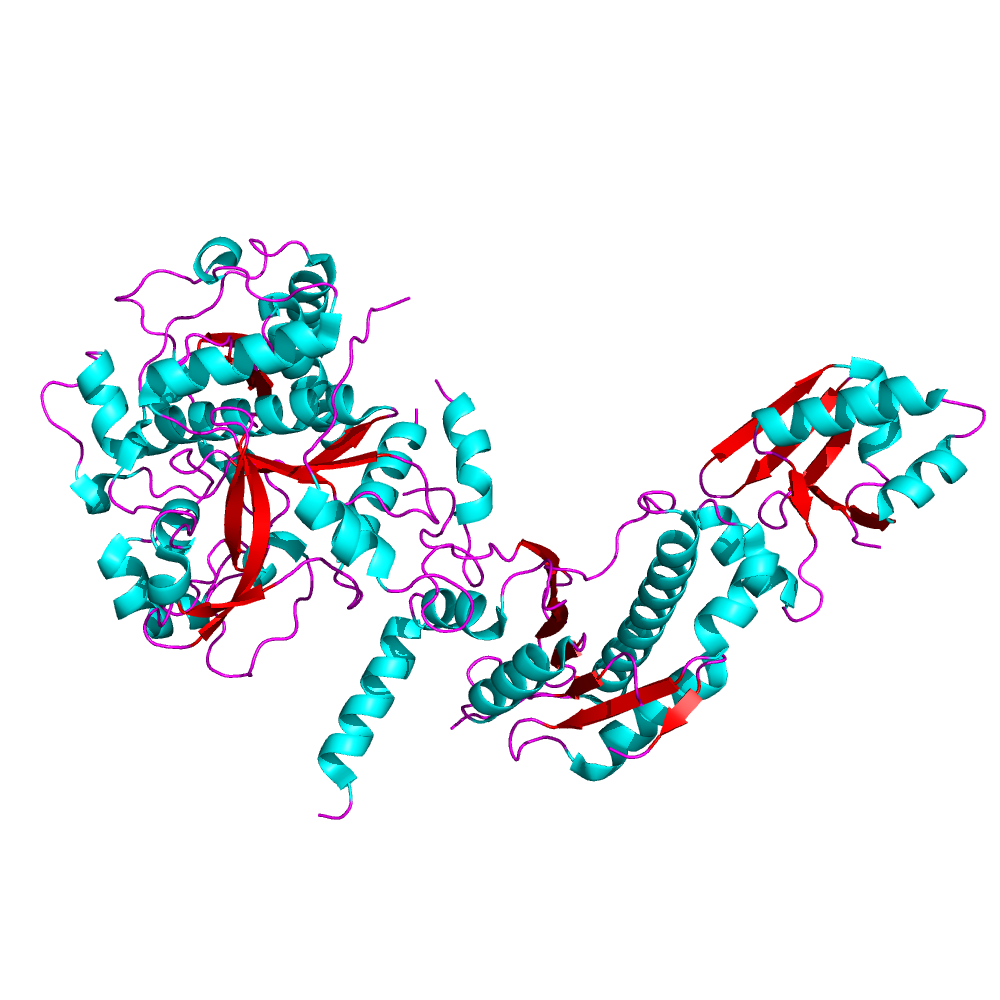
- Structure of the heterocyclase TruD. A YcaO-like protein from Prochloron sp. 06037A PDB entry 4bs9

Identifiers
- Symbol: YcaO
- Pfam: PF02624
- InterPro: IPR003776
Available protein structures:
- PDB: IPR003776 PF02624 (ECOD; PDBsum)
- AlphaFold: IPR003776; PF02624

YcaO is a protein found in bacteria which is involved in the synthesis of thiazole/oxazole modified microcin antibiotics, such as bottromycin. YcaO performs ATP dependent cyclodehydration to form the oxazole and thiazole moieties of the microcin.

The YcaO name origin is from a gene naming rubric that was established from the bacterium Escherichia coli. If a gene has an unknown function, it was given a four-letter name starting with the letter Y and the next three letters are given based on the genomic location.

Methyl coenzyme M reductase (MCR) or Coenzyme-B sulfoethylthiotransferase is a protein known in thioamidation (a posttranslational modification). A Ycao enzyme dependent on ATP is needed for MCR thioamidation as well as a sulfide source. YcaO enzymes are needed to catalyze the ATP-dependent backbone cyclodehydration of polar amino acids such as Cysteine, Serine, and Threonine to the correct thiazoline and (methyl) oxazoline Heterocycle. The side chains of these amino acids can act as Nucleophiles. The Thiol group in cysteine and the hydroxyl group of serine and threonine are strong nucleophiles.
