= Dehydroamino acid =

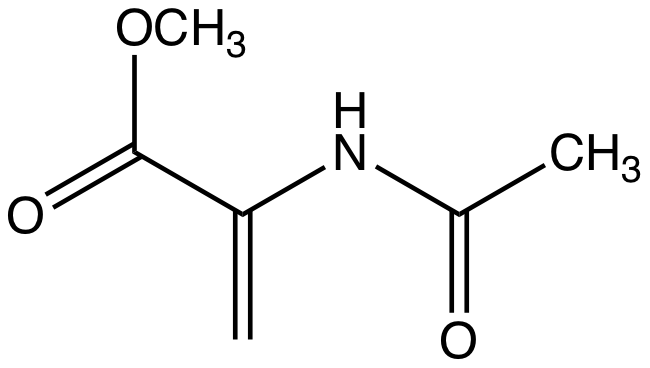
Methyl 2-acetamidoacrylate, by virtue of the N-acetyl group is a stabilized derivative of dehydroalanine.

In biochemistry, a dehydroamino acid or α,β-dehydroamino acid is an amino acids, usually with a C=C double bond in its side chain. Dehydroamino acids are not coded by DNA, but arise via post-translational modification.

== Examples ==
A common dehydroamino acid is dehydroalanine, which otherwise exists only as a residue in proteins and peptides. The dehydroalanine residue is obtained dehydration of serine-containing protein/peptide (alternatively, removal of H_{2}S from cysteine). Another example is dehydrobutyrine, derived from dehydration of threonine.

Generally, amino acid residues are unreactive toward nucleophiles, but the dehydroamino acids are exceptions to this pattern. For example, dehydroalanine adds cysteine and lysine to form covalent crosslinks.

An unusual dehydroamino acid is dehydroglycine (DHG) because it does not contain a carbon-carbon double bond. Instead it is the imino acid of glyoxalic acid. It arises by the radical-induced degradation of tyrosine.

Lanthionine is the product of the addition of cysteine to dehydroalanine.

== N-Acyl derivatives ==
Dehydroamino acids do not feature amino-alkene groups, but the corresponding N-acylated derivatives are known. These derivatives, also known as N-acylamino acrylates, are prochiral substrates for asymmetric hydrogenation. The 2001 Nobel Prize in Chemistry was awarded to William S. Knowles for his synthesis of L-DOPA from the N-acylacrylate.

Synthesis of L-DOPA via hydrogenation with C_{2}-symmetric diphosphine.
