= Cinnamycin =

Type B lantibiotic produced by Streptomyces cinnamoneus

Names
- IUPAC name (1S,4S,13S,16S,19R,22S,25S,28R,31S,37S,41R,44R,47S,50S,53R,56R,65S)-44-amino-37-(2-amino-2-oxoethyl)-50-(3-amino-3-oxopropyl)-4,16,22-tribenzyl-47-(3-carbamimidamidopropyl)-31-[(R)-carboxy(hydroxy)methyl]-41,70-dimethyl-2,5,8,14,17,20,23,26,29,32,35,38,45,48,51,54,57,67-octadecaoxo-25-propan-2-yl-42,69,72-trithia-3,6,9,15,18,21,24,27,30,33,36,39,46,49,52,55,58,60,66-nonadecazapentacyclo[38.18.9.3^{19,56}.3^{28,53}.0^{9,13}]triheptacontane-65-carboxylic acid
- Other names Lanthiopeptin; NSC-71936; Ro09-198

Identifiers
CAS Number	110655-58-8
3D model (JSmol)	Interactive image
ChEBI	CHEBI:141991
ChemSpider	21247574
PubChem CID	16130216
UNII	UM32RAQ8SC
- InChI: InChI=1S/C89H125N25O25S3/c1-43(2)66-84(133)109-59-41-140-40-58-79(128)108-60-42-142-45(4)68(86(135)105-55(75(124)110-66)34-48-22-12-7-13-23-48)111-76(125)54(33-47-20-10-6-11-21-47)104-82(131)61-26-17-31-114(61)65(118)38-98-72(121)53(32-46-18-8-5-9-19-46)103-78(127)57(106-80(60)129)36-95-29-15-14-24-52(87(136)137)102-85(134)67(112-77(126)56(35-63(92)116)99-64(117)37-97-83(132)69(113-81(59)130)70(119)88(138)139)44(3)141-39-49(90)71(120)100-50(25-16-30-96-89(93)94)73(122)101-51(74(123)107-58)27-28-62(91)115/h5-13,18-23,43-45,49-61,66-70,95,119H,14-17,24-42,90H2,1-4H3,(H2,91,115)(H2,92,116)(H,97,132)(H,98,121)(H,99,117)(H,100,120)(H,101,122)(H,102,134)(H,103,127)(H,104,131)(H,105,135)(H,106,129)(H,107,123)(H,108,128)(H,109,133)(H,110,124)(H,111,125)(H,112,126)(H,113,130)(H,136,137)(H,138,139)(H4,93,94,96)/t44-,45?,49+,50+,51+,52+,53+,54+,55+,56+,57+,58+,59+,60+,61+,66+,67?,68+,69+,70-/m1/s1 Key: QJDWKBINWOWJNZ-IDGBIKHQSA-N
- SMILES: C[C@@H]1C2C(=O)N[C@@H](CCCCNC[C@H]3C(=O)N[C@H](C(=O)NCC(=O)N4CCC[C@H]4C(=O)N[C@H](C(=O)N[C@H]5C(SC[C@@H](C(=O)N3)NC(=O)[C@H](CSC[C@@H](C(=O)N[C@H](C(=O)NCC(=O)N[C@H](C(=O)N2)CC(=O)N)[C@H](C(=O)O)O)NC(=O)[C@@H](NC(=O)[C@@H](NC5=O)CC6=CC=CC=C6)C(C)C)NC(=O)[C@@H](NC(=O)[C@@H](NC(=O)[C@H](CS1)N)CCCNC(=N)N)CCC(=O)N)C)CC7=CC=CC=C7)CC8=CC=CC=C8)C(=O)O

Properties
Chemical formula	C_{89}H_{125}N_{25}O_{25}S_{3}
Molar mass	2041.31 g·mol^{−1}
- Except where otherwise noted, data are given for materials in their standard state (at 25 °C [77 °F], 100 kPa). Infobox references

Cinnamycin is a tetracyclic antibacterial peptide produced by Streptomyces cinnamoneus containing 19 amino acid residues including the unusual amino acids threo-3-methyl-lanthionine, meso-lanthionine, lysinoalanine, and 3-hydroxyaspartic acid.

Cinnamycin belongs to the class of molecules known as lantibiotics which belongs to ribosomally synthesized post-translationally modified peptides. The unique receptor for cinnamycin is phosphatidylethanolamine (PE) lipids which is a major compound present in many bacterial cell membranes.

Cinnamycin was first isolated in 1952 and some other compounds with similar sequence and structure were found later.

== Structure ==
Cinnamycin has a compact globular structure and composed of following general amino acid sequence:

Ala-Arg-Gln-Ala-Ala-Ala-Phe-Gly-Pro-Phe-Abu-Phe-Val-Ala-Asp-Gly-Asn-Abu-Lys

The backbone amino acid residues are linked through four bridges including one mesolanthionine (Lan), two (2S,3S,6R)-3-methyllanthionines (MeLan) and one (2S,8S)-lysinoalanine (LysAla) bridge. Side chain crosslinking of serine and threonine with cysteine yields mesolanthionine(Lan) and methyllanthionine (MeLan) respectively. The presence of these thiol bridges along with lysinoalanine bridge makes cinnamycin one of the smallest peptides with a well-organized three dimensional structure. Based on NMR experiments, the binding pocket of cinnamycin consists of 7-14 amino acid residues which can accommodate the substrate phosphatidylethanolamine (PE). This smaller size of the binding pocket makes cinnamycin specific for its receptor (PE). However the function of erytho-3-hydroxy-L-aspartic acid (HyAsp) at residue 15, is not very pronounced.

The peptides duramycin and ancovenin can also be considered to belong to the family of cinnamycin. These peptides also consist of a similar structure to cinnamycin as globular 19 aa peptides with one Lan, two MeLan and an unusual lysinoalanine bridge between Lys-19 and Ser-6. They also exhibit a modification in position 15, an aspartate hydroxylation yielding the erythro-3-hydroxy-aspartic acid. Among the cinnamycin group, ancovenin is the most different variant since it does not possess the aspartate 15 modification and the lysine-alanine bridge.

== Receptor–molecule interactions ==
Cinnamycin selectively binds to its receptor phosphatidylethanolamine (PE) which resides in the inner layer of the plasma membrane with a 1:1 stoichiometry. Based on NMR studies, it has been suggested that this selectivity of cinnamycin for PE is due to the binding of the primary ammonium group of the PE head group into a small binding pocket on the peptide surface that cannot accommodate larger head groups such as that of e.g., phosphatidylcholine.

Cinamycin mainly interacts with PE through the hydrogen-bonding network formed between the lipid ammonium and the backbone carbonyl of Phe7 and Val13. The PE ammonium group also interacts with the hydroxyl and the carboxylate groups of HyAsp15. Beside this ammonium-binding site, the backbone amide hydrogens of residues 10−13 are also critical in binding the lipid phosphate.

It has also been reported that Duramycin and cinnamycin promote membrane binding by inducing transbilayer lipid movement and alter the curvature of PE present membrane upon binding since cinnamycin preferably binds to highly curved lipid membranes.

== Cinnamycin gene cluster – Cin ==
The genetics studies have revealed that the four genes cinA, cinM, cinX and cinorf7 play an important role in the biosynthesis of cinnamycin. cinA encodes the cinnamycin precursor peptide. The LanM family proteins encoded by the cinM gene are responsible for the dehydration of serine and threonine residues in the propeptide followed by the subsequent formation of lanthionine bridges. CinX encodes the protein that catalyzes the hydroxylation of aspartate at position 15. Furthermore cinorf7 is indicated to be crucial in the formation of lysinoalanine bridge.

== Biosynthesis ==
Lantibiotics are a group of ribosomally synthesized, post-translationally modified antimicrobial peptides with characteristic lanthionine(Lan) and methyllanthionine (MeLan) thioether crosslinks. The biosynthesis of cinnamycin is encoded by the cin biosynthetic gene cluster and the synthesis is initiated when the structural gene lanA encodes the precursor peptide which carries an N-terminal extension called "leader peptide" which is 59 amino acid residues long is recognized by various enzymes to process the C-terminal propeptide which is 19 amino acid residues long and will be transformed into cinnamycin through post-translational modifications. The first step in the formation of Lan/MeLan bridges is the dehydration of serine and threonine residues to yield dehydroalanine (Dha) and dehydrobutyrine (Dhb) respectively. These undergo through intramolecular Michael addition with neighbouring cysteine residues to form thioether bridges. Cinnamycin belongs to class II lantibiotics in which, both dehydration and cyclization are catalyzed by a bifunctional enzyme called LanM. After the core peptide is processed, the leader peptide is proteolytically cleaved from the mature peptide.

The post-translational modifications of cinnamycin include the formation of lanthionine bridges, the formation lysinoalanine (Lal) bridge between lysine 19 and serine 6 and the hydroxylation of L-aspartate at position 15.

In most of the class II lantibiotics GG or GA protease cleavage motif is present whereas in cinnamycin an AXA motif is present between the leader sequence and the core region of CinA.

A cinnamycin specific-protease is absent in the gene cluster and hence the sequence is recognized by type I signal peptidase of the general secretory (sec) pathway. The enzymes responsible for Asp hydroxylation and Lal bridge formation are yet to be discovered.

== Immunity mechanism ==
A unique immunity mechanism is present in the producing strain Streptomyces cinnamoneus against the inhibitory actions from its own product. In general Cinnamycin performs its antimicrobial activity by binding to phosphatidylethanolamine which is a major membrane lipid in streptomycetes. To protect the producing strain, the cinorf10 gene encodes a PE monomethyltransferase which catalyzes the PE methylation reaction. This transcription by cinorf10 begins at very low levels of cinnamycin to ensure a considerable amount of PE is methylated prior to high-level production of cinnamycin. Based on the structure of cinnamycin-PE complex, monomethylated PE will not fit into the binding pocket of cinnamycin and the inhibitory action will no longer be supported.

== Cinnamycin-like compounds ==
Based on the classification by Jung in 1991 there are two types of lantibiotics as type A and type B. Type A lantibiotics are elongated, flexible, rod like molecules that are positively charged and act on bacterial membranes by the formation of pores. In contrast type B lantibiotics have an inflexible globular structure due to the presence of characteristic head-to-tail crosslinkage. This group of molecules carries a negative charge or no net charge and interfere with various enzymes involved in cell wall biosynthesis.

Cinnamycin is closely related to type B lantibiotics duramycin, duramycin B, duramycin C, and ancovenin. These compounds are all derived from 19-aa propeptides and have one Lan, two MeLan and an unusual lysinoalanine bridge between Lys-19 and Ser-6 and an erythro-3-hydroxy-L-aspartic acid at position 15 which mediates the interaction between cinnamycin and its biological target phosphatidylethanolamine and hence important for their antimicrobial activity. They are all produced by actinomycetes, the duramycins and cinnamycin exclusively by streptomycetes.

== Biological activities ==
In addition to the antimicrobial properties, cinnamycin-like peptides exhibit inhibitory actions against the angiotensin-converting enzyme, the activity of phospholipase A2, proliferation of herpes simplex virus, prostaglandin, and leucotriene biosynthesis. Further it inhibits the growth of Bacillus subtilis, anaerobic bacteria, fungi and yeasts (although less intensely).

These peptides are also capable in treating the blood pressure regulation, inflammation and viral infection. These molecules consist of a well-defined pocket set up by the four cyclization events and recognizes phosphatidylethanolamine (PE) with a high affinity and selectivity. This ability to selectively bind to PE lipids makes cinnamycin an ideal probe for detecting the location of PE containing membranes such as cancer cells and to disrupt them.

The compounds like duramycin and cinnamycin which disrupt PE association with phosphatidylserine receptors necessary for entry of many enveloped viruses is a promising strategy for broad-spectrum antiviral activity. Cinnamycin binds to the substrate of phospholipase A2, the phosphatidylethanolamine (PE) with a high specificity at a 1:1 ratio and this binding alters the operation of ion channels. This feature is utilized in pharmaceutical industry for cystic fibrosis treatment. Furthermore, PLA2 catalyzes the reaction for liberating arachidonic acid from phospholipids in the cell membranes, which is a precursor for the synthesis of eicosanoids, which are associated with inflammation. Such lantibiotics can also be used in regulation of inflammatory processes. The inhibition of PLA2 is also associated with treatments for some diseases such as atherosclerosis, diabetes and cancer.
