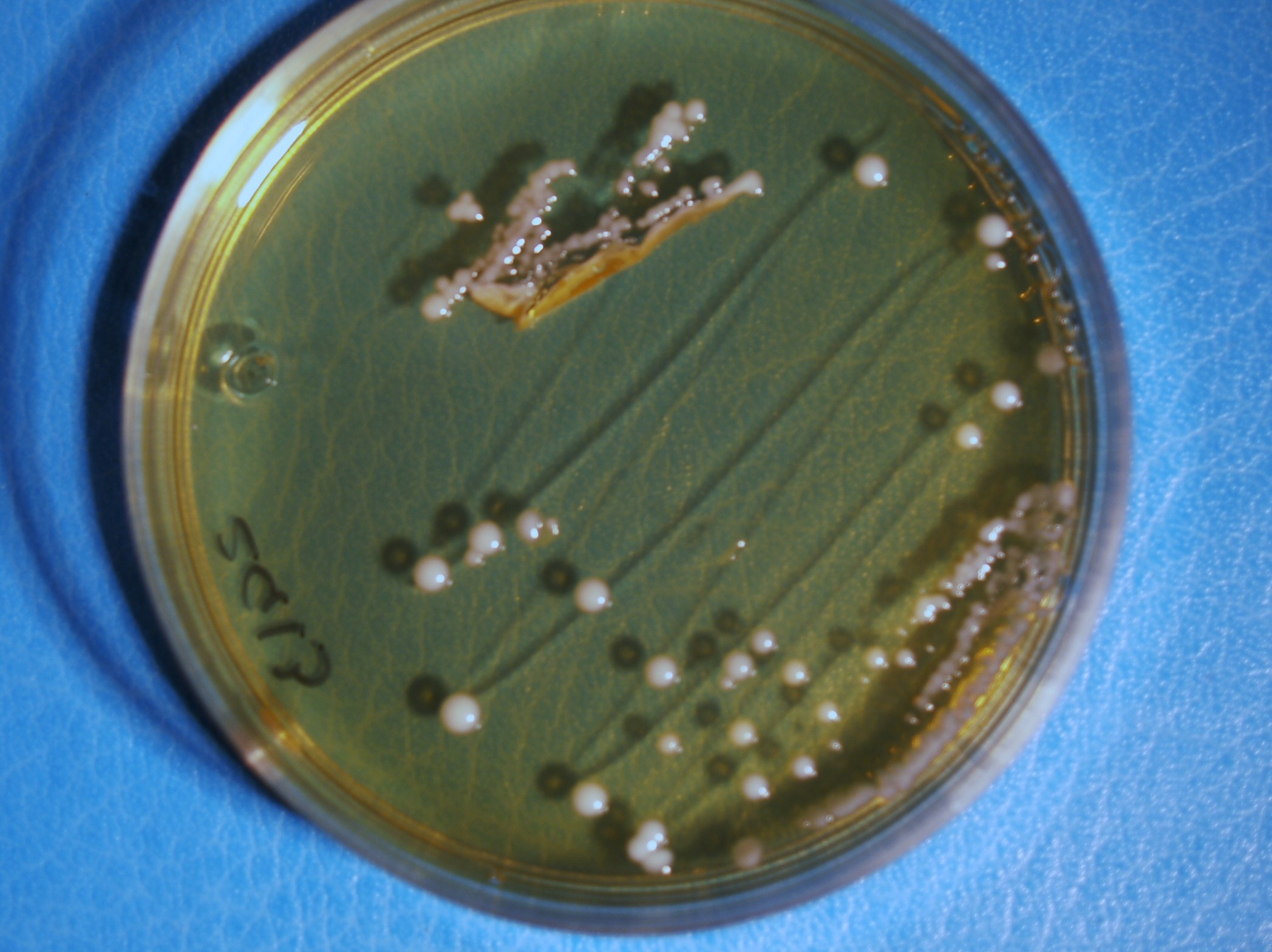

Scientific classification
- Domain: Bacteria
- Kingdom: Bacillati
- Phylum: Bacillota
- Class: Bacilli
- Order: Lactobacillales
- Family: Lactobacillaceae
- Genus: Latilactobacillus
- Species: L. sakei

Binomial name
- Latilactobacillus sakei (Katagiri et al. 1934) Zheng et al. 2020

Subspecies
- Latilactobacillus sakei subsp. carnosus (Torriani et al. 1996) Zheng et al. 2020; Latilactobacillus sakei subsp. sakei (Katagiri et al. 1934) Zheng et al. 2020

Synonyms
- Lactobacillus sakei corrig. Katagiri et al. 1934 (Approved Lists 1980); Lactobacillus sake Katagiri et al. 1934 (Approved Lists 1980); Lactobacillus bavaricus Stetter and Stetter 1980

= Latilactobacillus sakei =

Species of bacterium

Latilactobacillus sakei is the type species of the genus Latilactobacillus that was previously classified in the genus Lactobacillus. It is homofermentative; hexoses are metabolized via glycolysis to lactic acid as main metabolite; pentoses are fermented via the phosphoketolase pathway to lactic and acetic acid.

== Uses ==
Antilisterial strains of L. sakei are used in Europe for the production of saucisson and can be used for the conservation of fresh meat.

Latilactobacillus sakei strains isolated from traditional dry sausage have a potential use as starter cultures.

Inhibition of Listeria monocytogenes in chicken cold cuts can be obtained by addition of sakacin P and sakacin P-producing Lactobacillus sakei.

Strain 2a of the subspecies L. sakei subsp. sakei can also be isolated from meat products.

Latilactobacillus sakei is the dominant species during the manufacturing process of producing sake (Japanese rice wine) starter culture.

Research suggests that L. sakei may play a role in maintaining healthy sinus cavities and preventing sinusitis. A clinical study investigating the impact of probiotics in relieving the signs and symptoms of dry eye revealed promising results for the ophthalmic formulation of Latilactobacillus sakei, while the oral probiotic demonstrated no discernible benefits.

== Biochemistry ==
=== Bacteriocins production ===
Sakacins are bacteriocins of class II produced by L. sakei.

In strain CCUG 42687, their production is dependent on nutrients, temperature and pH. Using the same strain, sakacin P can be produced in a completely defined medium.

In strain CTC 494, the presence of salt and a curing agent (sodium chloride and sodium nitrite) reduces the production of the antilisterial bacteriocin sakacin K. Growth of CTC 494 is also dependent on nutrients availability.

Lactocin S is a bacteriocin produced by strain L45 of Lactobacillus sakei.

=== Exopolysaccharide biosynthesis ===
Strain 0–1 of L. sakei produces exopolysaccharides.

== Prevention ==
Eugenol is a chemical compound that can be used to reduce the presence of L. sakei as it disrupts its cellular membranes.

== Genetics ==
Genetic diversity within L. sakei has been assessed through the use of specifically designed PCR primers for detection using randomly amplified polymorphic DNA, or by multi-locus sequence typing.

=== Bacteriocin genes ===
Bacteriocin genes are located either on chromosomes or on bacteriocinogenic plasmids. Strain 5 produces a plasmid-encoded bacteriocin that is identical to sakacin P, as well as two chromosomally encoded bacteriocins, which were designated sakacin T and sakacin X.

LasX is a transcriptional regulator of the lactocin S biosynthetic genes in strain L45 of Lactobacillus sakei.

=== Other genes ===
In strain LTH677, a starter organism used in meat fermentation, there is an oxygen-dependent regulation of the expression of the catalase gene katA.

In strain LTH681, the stress operon dnaK has been characterized in 1999 as a heat shock protein gene.

There is only one gene (IdhL) responsible for the lactic fermentation.

=== Plasmids ===
A Theta-type plasmid has been characterized in Lactobacillus sakei in 2003. It is a potential basis for Low-Copy-Number vectors in lactobacilli.

Vectors for inducible gene expression in L. sakei can be constructed. The key elements of these vectors are a regulatable promoter involved in the production of the bacteriocins sakacin A and sakacin P and the genes encoding the cognate histidine protein kinase and response regulator that are necessary to activate this promoter upon induction by a peptide pheromone.

=== Genome ===
The genome of the meat-borne lactic acid bacterium Lactobacillus sakei 23K has been published in 2005.

It is composed of 1884661 nucleotides forming 1879 protein genes and 84 RNA genes.
