= Vibriocin =

Vibriocins are a group of bacteriocins produced by, and active against, gram-negative bacteria in the genus Vibrio. They were first discovered in 1962, considerably after the original bacteriocins, the colicins, which were discovered in 1925.

Like other bacteriocins, vibriocins are protein toxins. They can kill bacteria beyond the genus Vibrio, including other proteobacteria. They have been used for abortive classification schemes of the vibrio, particularly to type various kinds of cholera, against which they were thought to have potential as antibiotics. Their mode of action, genetics and regulation have all been studied, for at least one example. In all likelihood, however, they are as common and as diverse as the colicins, making it very unlikely that these initial experiments have fully explored the range of mechanisms and forms that the vibriocins take.

In the 1970s, they were investigated, along with some colicins, as potential chemotherapeutic agents. The mode of action appears to be nuclease activity resulting in the induction of apoptosis. The research itself was the result of observing unexpected interactions between the vibriocins and eukaryotic cells.

== See also ==
- Bacteriocin
- Colicin
- Vibrio
- Antimicrobial peptides
- Bacterial toxin
