= E234 =

E234 may refer to:

- Nisin European E number
- European route E234
