= Pyocin =

Type of bacteriocin

Pyocins are bacteriocins produced by bacteria belonging to the Pseudomonas genus. François Jacob described the first pyocin in 1954. Pyocins can be divided into three distinct classes: S-type, R-type, and F-type pyocins. S-type pyocins are colicin-like bacteriocins and R-type and F-type pyocins belong to tailocins.

== R-type and F-type pyocins ==
R- and F-type pyocins have mainly been investigated in Pseudomonas aeruginosa. These two types differ by their structure; they are both composed of a sheath and a hollow tube forming a long helicoidal hexameric structure attached to a baseplate. There are multiple tail fibers that allow the particle to bind to the target cell. However, the R-pyocins are a large, rigid contractile tail-like structure whereas the F-pyocins are small flexible, non-contractile tail-like structures. The F-type pyocins described so far are pyocin 28, 430f, F1, F2, and F3.

R-pyocins are known for their distinctive structure, which resembles the contractile tail of a Myoviridae bacteriophage, but they lack the DNA-containing capsid head. This non-replicative nature offers advantages over phage therapy, such as predictable dosing and the inability to facilitate horizontal gene transfer of virulence or antibiotic resistance genes.

The killing mechanism of R-pyocins is highly targeted and involves several steps:

- Receptor Binding: The R-pyocin tail fibers recognize and bind to specific monosaccharide residues in the outer core oligosaccharide of the target bacterium's lipopolysaccharide (LPS), which decorates the outer membrane. The LPS acts as both the receptor and, potentially, a shield.
- Contraction and Puncture: Upon binding, the baseplate undergoes a conformational change that triggers the sheath to contract. The contraction drives the inner tube and tail spike to puncture the outer membrane of the target cell.
- Cell Death: This interaction is thought to form an ion-conducting channel that rapidly dissipates the cell's proton motive force, leading to membrane depolarization and ultimately cell death.

R-pyocins are categorized into five subtypes (R1-R5), distinguished by the specificity of their tail fiber for different LPS receptors. Subtypes are often grouped together as a single functional subtype due to high sequence similarity in their variable C-terminal tail fiber regions. Studies have shown that a high frequency of P. aeruginosa strains isolated from cystic fibrosis (CF) lung infections are susceptible to R2-pyocins, supporting their potential as therapeutic agents. Further, R-pyocins have also been shown to be effective at clearing P. aeruginosa biofilms.

== S-type pyocins ==
S-type (soluble) pyocins are binary protein complexes that compose of a cytotoxic protein and an immunity protein that protects the producing strain from cytotoxic effects. The amino-terminal domain of the protein takes part in receptor binding as the carboxy-terminal domain is responsible for cytotoxic effect. Most S-type pyocins act by degrading DNA and RNA but some exhibit their cytotoxicity by forming pores to cell surface or by lipid degradation. Several S-type pyocins have been found so far: S1, S2, AP41, S3, S4, S5, S6.

Pyocin G is an example of a novel S1-type nuclease pyocin. It binds to hemin uptake receptor Hur on target cell surface and translocates to the cytoplasm where it degrades DNA. Pyocin G uses inner membrane proteins TonB1 and FtsH for translocation. Pyocin G is highly active against P. aeruginosa clinical isolates in vitro as well as in vivo and could be active in P.aeruginosa infections also in humans

In silico methods are revealing also new types of S-pyocins when large databases of sequenced DNA from Pseudomonas-genus are being screened for new pyocin coding sequences.
