= Andre Gratia =

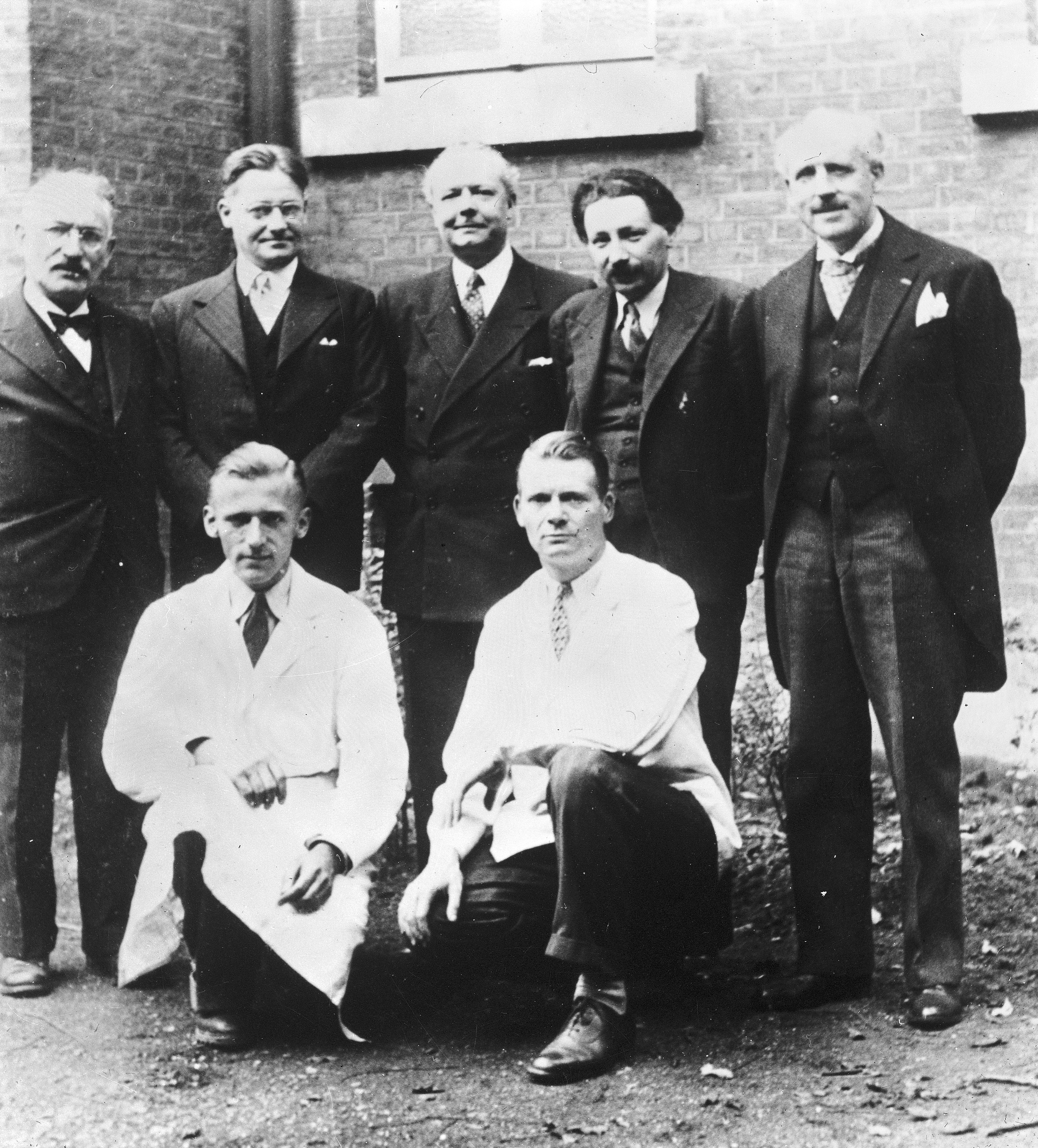
Standing at back, left to right, Selman Waksman, Howard Florey, Jacques Tréfouël, Ernst Boris Chain and Andre Gratia. In front, left to right, Pierre Fredericq and Maurice Welsch

André Gratia (8 July 1893 – 6 October 1950) was a Belgian microbiologist who discovered and pioneered the study of bacteriocins. Although he started as a physician, he moved to virology and bacteriology studies. In 1925 he discovered a strain of E. coli that produced a resistance to a phage CA81 and called it strain V which is now known as C7. He also noted that extracts of Penicillium were capable of killing anthrax cultures, about three years before Alexander Fleming extracted penicillin.

== Life and work ==
Gratia was born in St. Gilles, Brussels, and was inspired by his father, Gustave (1855-1932), who was a professor of veterinary medicine and a medical doctor. Gustave Gratia became well known in 1903 when he challenged Robert Koch's claim at the Hygiene Congress in Brussels that milk did not need Pasteurization. Gratia had demonstrated that bovine tuberculosis could be transmitted to humans through milk. The son was inspired at an early age by his father's work and he too studied medicine at the Université Libre de Bruxelles. His studies were interrupted when he was drafted into World War I where he served as an auxiliary doctor. He graduated in 1919 and became a physician. He conducted physiological studies and discovered coagulase activity caused by staphylococci in blood and began to move towards microbiological studies. He began to study the antibacterial properties of a substance that he called mycolysate. In 1920 he went to Institut Pasteur and spent some time at the Rockefeller Institute in New York. He then worked with Jules Bordet on the hypothesis that bacteriophage activity was caused purely by enzymes. In 1924 he worked with his assistants Bernice Rhodes and Sara Dath on streptomyces antibiotic production under anaerobic conditions. They also tested Penicillium glaucum on an anthrax culture and discovered antibiotic activity three years before Alexander Fleming. Fleming and Gratia were friends and when the University of Liège presented Fleming with an honorary doctorate in 1945, Gratia wrote and gave the presentation speech. In 1925 he identified the bacteriocin colicin V. He became a professor of bacteriology, parasitology and immunology at the University of Liège. In 1945, Gratia worked with Pierre Fredericq on colicins. He studied the grasserie virus of silkworm along with André Paillot (1885–1944). He introduced several techniques such as double layer agar cultures and in virology the use of ultracentrifuges and fractional centrifugation.
