= C6H9NO3 =

The molecular formula C_{6}H_{9}NO_{3} (molar mass: 143.142 g/mol) may refer to:

- Methyl 2-acetamidoacrylate, organic compound
- Trimethadione, an oxazolidinedione anticonvulsant
