= Enterocin =

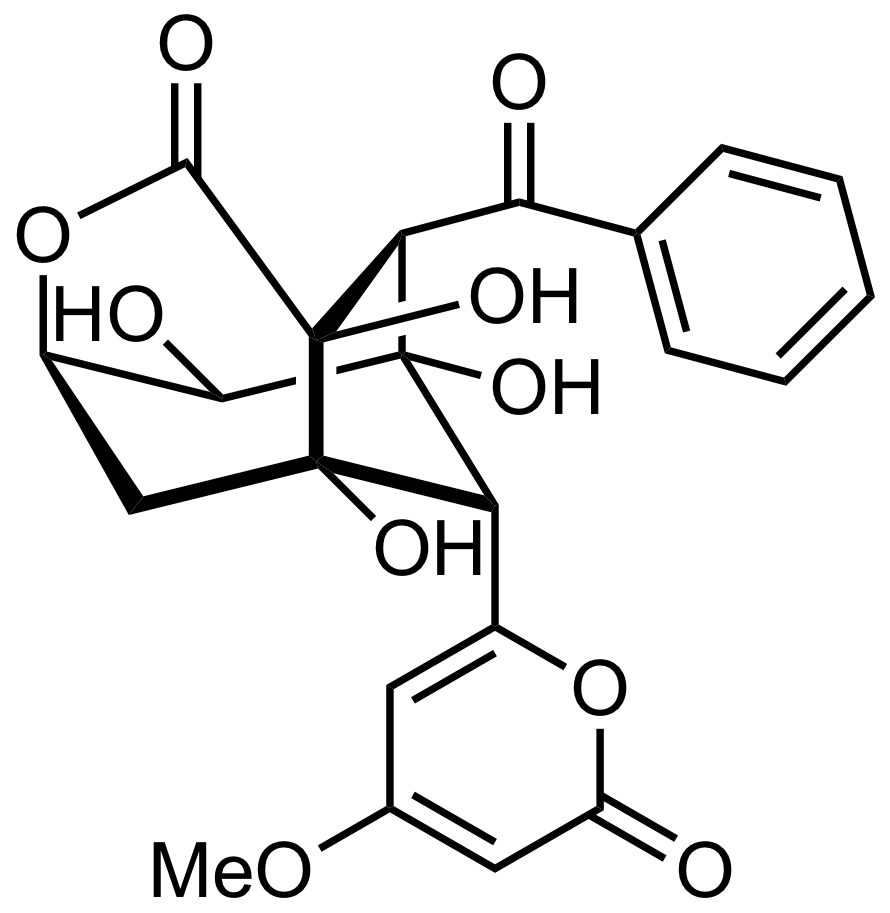

Names
- IUPAC name (10S)-2-benzoyl-1,3,8,10-tetrahydroxy-9-(4-methoxy-6-oxopyran-2-yl)-5-oxatricyclo[4.3.1.0^{3,8}]decan-4-one
- Other names Vulgamycin

Identifiers
CAS Number	59678-46-5
3D model (JSmol)	Interactive image
ChemSpider	19978603
PubChem CID	10478614
UNII	2M8WGY5QPQ
CompTox Dashboard (EPA)	DTXSID10975078
- InChI: InChI=1S/C22H20O10/c1-30-11-7-12(31-14(23)8-11)16-20(27)9-13-18(25)21(16,28)17(22(20,29)19(26)32-13)15(24)10-5-3-2-4-6-10/h2-8,13,16-18,25,27-29H,9H2,1H3/t13?,16?,17?,18-,20?,21?,22?/m0/s1 Key: CTBBEXWJRAPJIZ-LXJDDUSDSA-N
- SMILES: COC1=CC(=O)OC(=C1)C2C3(CC4C(C2(C(C3(C(=O)O4)O)C(=O)C5=CC=CC=C5)O)O)O

Properties
Chemical formula	C_{22}H_{20}O_{10}
Molar mass	444.392 g·mol^{−1}
- Except where otherwise noted, data are given for materials in their standard state (at 25 °C [77 °F], 100 kPa). Infobox references

Enterocin and its derivatives are bacteriocins synthesized by the lactic acid bacteria, Enterococcus. This class of polyketide antibiotics are effective against foodborne pathogens including L. monocytogenes, Listeria, and Bacillus. Due to its proteolytic degradability in the gastrointestinal tract, enterocin is used for controlling foodborne pathogens via human consumption.

== History ==
Enterocin was discovered from soil and marine Streptomyces strains as well as from marine ascidians of Didemnum and it has also been found in a mangrove strains Streptomyces qinglanensis and Salinispora pacifica.

== Total synthesis ==
The total synthesis of enterocin has been reported.

== Biosynthesis ==
Enterocin has a caged, tricyclic, nonaromatic core and its formation undergoes a flavoenzyme (EncM) catalyzed Favorskii-like rearrangement of a poly(beta-carbonyl). Studies done on enterocin have shown that it is biosynthesized from a type II polyketide synthase (PKS) pathway, starting with a structure derived from phenylalanine or activation of benzoic acid followed by the EncM catalyzed rearrangement.

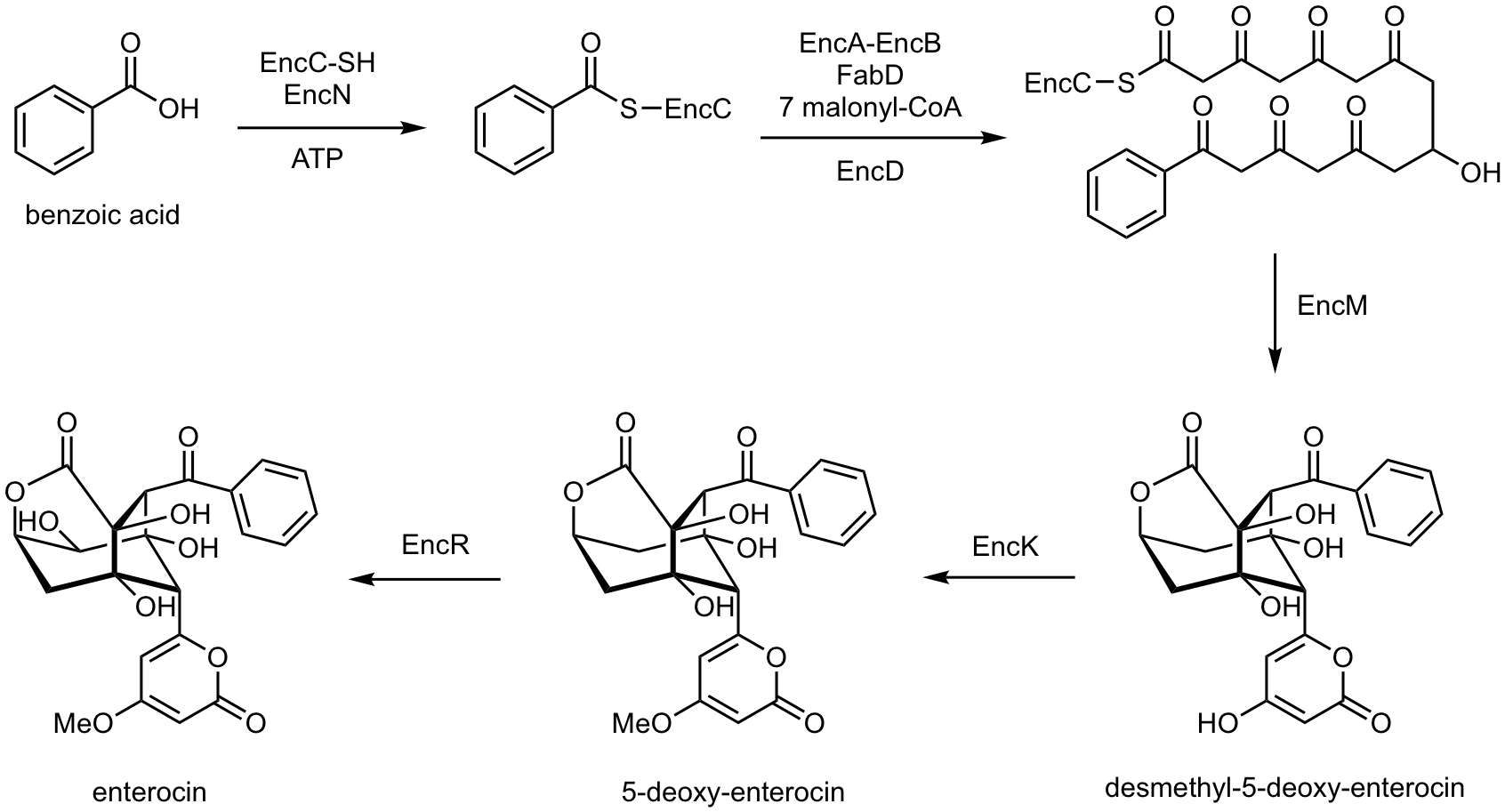
Proposed biosynthetic pathway of enterocin.

The enzyme EncN catalyzes the ATP-dependent transfer of the benzoate to EncC, the acyl carrier protein. EncC transfers the aromatic unit to EncA-EncB, the ketosynthase in order for malonation via FabD, the malonyl-CoA:ACP transacylase. A Claisen condensation occurs between the benzoyl and malonyl groups and occurs six more times followed by reaction with EncD, a ketoreductase; the intermediate undergoes the EncM catalyzed oxidative rearrangement to form the enterocin tricyclic core. Further reaction with O-methyltransferase, EncK and cytochrome P450 hydroxylase, EncR yields enterocin.
