= Colicin =

Type of bacteriocin produced by and toxic to some strains of Escherichia coli

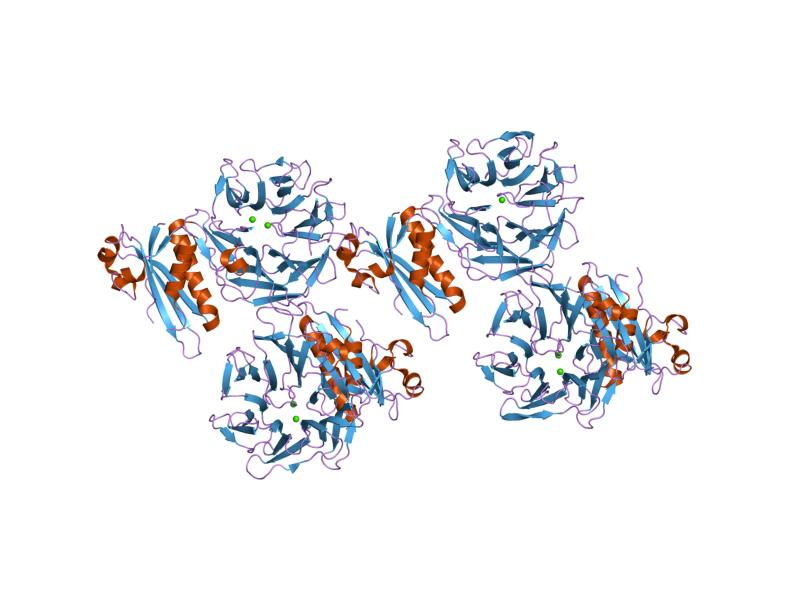
- Structure of TolB in complex with a peptide of the colicin e9 t-domain

Identifiers
- Symbol: Colicin
- Pfam: PF03515
- Pfam clan: CL0446
- InterPro: IPR003058
- SCOP2: 1jch / SCOPe / SUPFAM
Available protein structures:
- Pfam: structures / ECOD
- PDB: RCSB PDB; PDBe; PDBj
- PDBsum: structure summary

A colicin is a type of bacteriocin produced by and toxic to some strains of Escherichia coli. Colicins are released into the environment to reduce competition from other bacterial strains. Colicins bind to outer membrane receptors, using them to translocate to the cytoplasm or cytoplasmic membrane, where they exert their cytotoxic effect, including depolarisation of the cytoplasmic membrane, DNase activity, RNase activity, or inhibition of murein synthesis.

== Structure ==
Channel-forming colicins (colicins A, B, E1, Ia, Ib, and N) are transmembrane proteins that depolarize the cytoplasmic membrane, leading to dissipation of cellular energy. These colicins contain at least three domains: an N-terminal translocation domain responsible for movement across the outer membrane and periplasmic space (T domain); a central domain responsible for receptor recognition (R domain); and a C-terminal cytotoxic domain responsible for channel formation in the cytoplasmic membrane (C domain). R domain regulates the target and binds to the receptor on the sensitive cell. T domain is involved in translocation, co-opting the machinery of the target cell. The C domain is the 'killing' domain and may produce a pore in the target cell membrane, or act as a nuclease to chop up the DNA or RNA of the target cell.

== Translocation ==
Most colicins are able to translocate the outer membrane by a two-receptor system, where one receptor is used for the initial binding and the second for translocation. The initial binding is to cell surface receptors such as the outer membrane proteins OmpF, FepA, BtuB, Cir and FhuA; colicins have been classified according to which receptors they bind to. The presence of specific periplasmic proteins, such as TolA, TolB, TolC, or TonB, are required for translocation across the membrane. Cloacin DF13 is a bacteriocin that inactivates ribosomes by hydrolysing 16S RNA in 30S ribosomes at a specific site.

== Resistance ==
Because they target specific receptors and use specific translocation machinery, cells can make themselves resistant to the colicin by repressing or deleting the genes for these proteins. Such resistant cells may suffer the lack of a key nutrient (such as iron or a B vitamin), but benefit by not being killed. Colicins exhibit a '1-hit killing kinetic' which does not necessarily mean a single molecule is sufficient to kill, but certainly that it only takes a small number. In his 1969 Nobel Laureate speech, Salvador E. Luria speculated that colicins could only be this toxic by causing a domino effect that destabilized the cell membrane. He was not entirely correct, but pore-forming colicins do depolarize the membrane and thus eliminate the energy source for the cell. The colicins are highly effective toxins.

== Genetic organisation ==
Virtually all colicins are carried on plasmids. The two general classes of colicinogenic plasmids are large, low-copy-number plasmids, and small, high-copy-number plasmids. The larger plasmids carry other genes, as well as the colicin operon. The colicin operons are generally organized with several major genes. These include a colicin structural gene, an immunity gene, and a bacteriocin release protein (BRP), or lysis, gene. The immunity gene is often produced constitutively, while the BRP is generally produced only as a read-through of the stop codon on the colicin structural gene. The colicin itself is repressed by the SOS response and may be regulated in other ways as well.

Retaining the colicin plasmid is very important for cells that live with their relatives, because if a cell loses the immunity gene, it quickly becomes subject to destruction by circulating colicin. At the same time, colicin is only released from a producing cell by the use of the lysis protein, which results in that cell's death. This suicidal production mechanism would appear to be very costly, except for the fact that it is regulated by the SOS response, which responds to significant DNA damage. In short, colicin production may only occur in terminally ill cells. The Professor Kleanthous Research Group at the University of Oxford study colicins extensively as a model system for characterising and investigating protein-protein interactions and recognition.

BACTIBASE database is an open-access database for bacteriocins including colicins (view complete list).
