= Actagardin =

Names
- Systematic IUPAC name (2R,5S,8R,11S,14S,17R,23R,26R,32R,35S,38R,41R,44R)-44-{(2S,3S)-2-[(2R)-2-{(2S)-2-[(2R)-2-Aminopropanamido]-4-methylpentanamido}butanamido]-3-methylpentanamido}-11-[(2S)-butan-2-yl]-17,41-diethyl-26-(hydroxymethyl)-32-[(1H-indol-3-yl)methyl]-2,5,8,23,38-pentamethyl-4,7,10,13,16,19,22,25,28,31,34,38,40,43-tetradecaoxo-14,35-di(propan-2-yl)-3,6,9,12,15,18,21,24,27,30,33,37,39,42-tetradecaazaheptatetracontanedioic acid
- Other names Gardimycin

Identifiers
CAS Number	59165-34-3
3D model (JSmol)	Interactive image
ChemSpider	17288969
PubChem CID	16132310
CompTox Dashboard (EPA)	DTXSID80207893
- InChI: InChI=1S/C81H132N20O23/c1-20-40(12)63(79(121)89-45(17)67(109)86-44(16)68(110)90-47(19)81(123)124)101-78(120)62(39(10)11)99-72(114)50(22-3)91-58(103)34-84-66(108)43(15)87-76(118)57(36-102)92-59(104)35-85-70(112)56(32-48-33-83-53-28-26-25-27-49(48)53)97-77(119)61(38(8)9)98-69(111)46(18)88-71(113)51(23-4)93-74(116)54(29-30-60(105)106)95-80(122)64(41(13)21-2)100-73(115)52(24-5)94-75(117)55(31-37(6)7)96-65(107)42(14)82/h25-28,33,37-47,50-52,54-57,61-64,83,102H,20-24,29-32,34-36,82H2,1-19H3,(H,84,108)(H,85,112)(H,86,109)(H,87,118)(H,88,113)(H,89,121)(H,90,110)(H,91,103)(H,92,104)(H,93,116)(H,94,117)(H,95,122)(H,96,107)(H,97,119)(H,98,111)(H,99,114)(H,100,115)(H,101,120)(H,105,106)(H,123,124)/t40-,41-,42+,43+,44-,45+,46+,47+,50+,51+,52+,54+,55-,56+,57+,61-,62-,63-,64-/m0/s1 Key: LAWKVNVCUPIOMG-HWWYPGLISA-N; InChI=1/C81H132N20O23/c1-20-40(12)63(79(121)89-45(17)67(109)86-44(16)68(110)90-47(19)81(123)124)101-78(120)62(39(10)11)99-72(114)50(22-3)91-58(103)34-84-66(108)43(15)87-76(118)57(36-102)92-59(104)35-85-70(112)56(32-48-33-83-53-28-26-25-27-49(48)53)97-77(119)61(38(8)9)98-69(111)46(18)88-71(113)51(23-4)93-74(116)54(29-30-60(105)106)95-80(122)64(41(13)21-2)100-73(115)52(24-5)94-75(117)55(31-37(6)7)96-65(107)42(14)82/h25-28,33,37-47,50-52,54-57,61-64,83,102H,20-24,29-32,34-36,82H2,1-19H3,(H,84,108)(H,85,112)(H,86,109)(H,87,118)(H,88,113)(H,89,121)(H,90,110)(H,91,103)(H,92,104)(H,93,116)(H,94,117)(H,95,122)(H,96,107)(H,97,119)(H,98,111)(H,99,114)(H,100,115)(H,101,120)(H,105,106)(H,123,124)/t40-,41-,42+,43+,44-,45+,46+,47+,50+,51+,52+,54+,55-,56+,57+,61-,62-,63-,64-/m0/s1 Key: LAWKVNVCUPIOMG-HWWYPGLIBM
- SMILES: CC[C@H](C)[C@@H](C(=O)N[C@H](CCC(=O)O)C(=O)N[C@H](CC)C(=O)N[C@H](C)C(=O)N[C@@H](C(C)C)C(=O)N[C@H](CC1=CNC2=CC=CC=C21)C(=O)NCC(=O)N[C@H](CO)C(=O)N[C@H](C)C(=O)NCC(=O)N[C@H](CC)C(=O)N[C@@H](C(C)C)C(=O)N[C@@H]([C@@H](C)CC)C(=O)N[C@H](C)C(=O)N[C@@H](C)C(=O)N[C@H](C)C(=O)O)NC(=O)[C@@H](CC)NC(=O)[C@H](CC(C)C)NC(=O)[C@@H](C)N

Properties
Chemical formula	C_{81}H_{132}N_{20}O_{23}
Molar mass	1754.064 g·mol^{−1}
- Except where otherwise noted, data are given for materials in their standard state (at 25 °C [77 °F], 100 kPa). Infobox references

Actagardin (INN; also known as gardimycin) is a tetracyclic peptide lantibiotic made by Actinoplanes brasiliensis. It was discovered in 1975 by Lepetit S.p.A. Its method of antibiotic activity involves the inhibition of peptidoglycan, preferentially targeting gram negative bacteria. It has become the subject of recent renewed inteterst in the fight against antibiotic resistant bacteria, particularly in the treatment of Streptococcus and Clostridioides difficile, though no pharmaceutical manufacturer is currently known to be pursuing commercialization.
