= Cloacin immunity protein =

Cloacin_immun
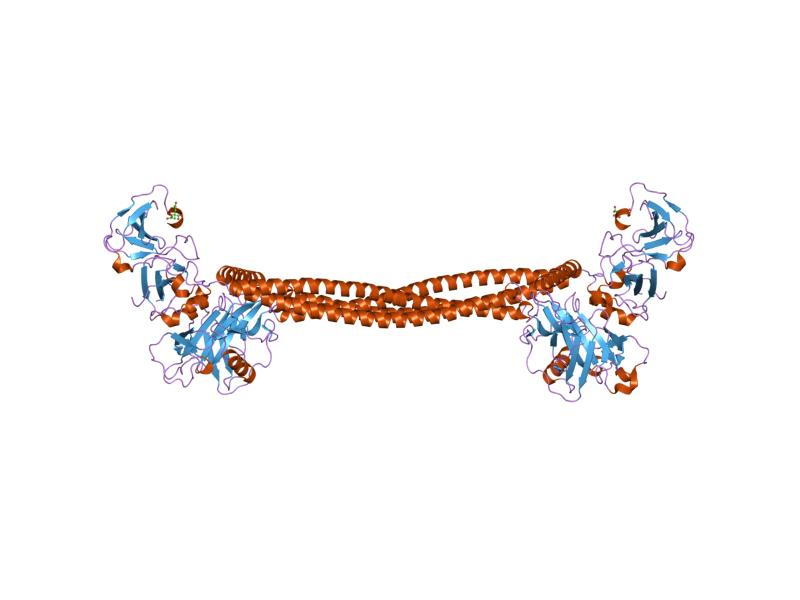
- crystal structure of colicin e3 v206c mutant in complex with its immunity protein

Identifiers
- Symbol: Cloacin_immun
- Pfam: PF03513
- InterPro: IPR003063
- SCOP2: 3eip / SCOPe / SUPFAM
Available protein structures:
- PDB: IPR003063 PF03513 (ECOD; PDBsum)
- AlphaFold: IPR003063; PF03513

In molecular biology, the cloacin immunity protein is produced by bacteria if they contain a certain bacteriocinogenic plasmid. It inhibits the polypeptide bacterial toxin, cloacin, which is produced by the same or other bacteria. It complexes with cloacin in equimolar quantities and inhibits it by binding with high affinity to the cloacin C-terminal catalytic domain.

The immunity protein is relatively small, containing 85 amino acids. An extra ribosome binding site has been found to precede the immunity gene on the polycistronic Clo DF13 mRNA, which perhaps accounts for the fact that, in cloacinogenic cells, more immunity protein than cloacin is synthesised. Comparison of the complete amino acid sequence of the Clo DF13 immunity protein with that of the Col E3 and Col E6 immunity proteins reveals extensive similarities in primary structure, although Col E3 and Clo DF13 immunity proteins are exchangeable only to a low extent in vivo and in vitro.
