= Halocin =

Halocins are bacteriocins produced by halophilic Archaea and a type of archaeocin.

Since their discovery in 1982, halocins have been demonstrated to be diverse in a similar ways as the other bacteriocins. Some are large proteins, some small polypeptides (microhalocins). This diversity is surprising for a number of reasons, including the original presumptions that Archaea, particularly extremophiles, live at relatively low densities under conditions that may not require antagonistic behavior.

The genetics, mechanism of production and mechanism of action of the halocins have been studied, but not exhaustively. The ecology of the halocins has been investigated as well. One interesting observation is that the halocins are active across the major divisions of archaea, thus violating the dogma that they should be most effective against the most closely related strains.

Halocins are particularly interesting because of the way the pore-forming bacteriocins have been used to probe cell membrane structure and the production and maintenance of energetic ion gradients across the membrane. The halophiles live at such extreme ion concentrations that they represent a set of unusual solutions and adaptations with regard to their energetic gradients. The ability to use native halocins to study these gradients provides a motivation for their characterization.

They may have a role in human medicine.

They are also found in many of the type species that are used to learn about halophiles in general.

Like other bacteriocins, the halocins are under investigation as antimicrobials for use in controlling spoilage during industrial processes; in this case, leather production.

Because the literature about halocins is relatively circumscribed, it can be exhaustively cited. Several times they have been addressed in book chapters.

BACTIBASE database is an open-access database for bacteriocins including halocins (view complete list).
