= Bacteriocin IId =

Bacteriocin_IId
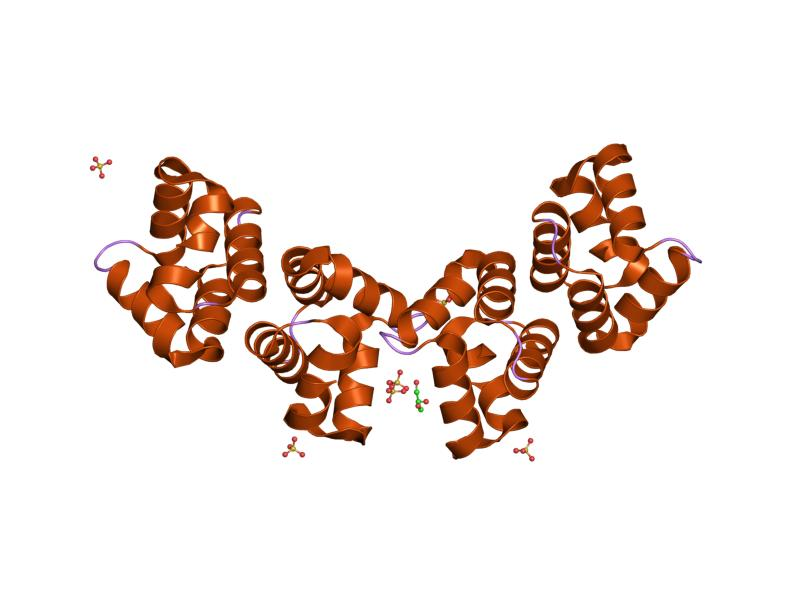
- x-ray structure of bacteriocin as-48 at ph 4.5. sulphate bound form

Identifiers
- Symbol: Bacteriocin_IId
- Pfam: PF09221
- InterPro: IPR009086
- SCOP2: 1o82 / SCOPe / SUPFAM
- TCDB: 1.C.28
Available protein structures:
- PDB: IPR009086 PF09221 (ECOD; PDBsum)
- AlphaFold: IPR009086; PF09221

Bacteriocin AS-48 is a cyclic peptide antibiotic produced by the eubacteria Enterococcus faecalis (Streptococcus faecalis) that shows a broad antimicrobial spectrum against both Gram-positive and Gram-negative bacteria. Bacteriocin AS-48 is encoded by the pheromone-responsive plasmid pMB2, and acts on the plasma membrane in which it opens pores leading to ion leakage and cell death. The globular structure of bacteriocin AS-48 is composed of five alpha helices enclosing a hydrophobic core. The mammalian NK-lysin effector protein of T and natural killer cells has a similar structure, though it lacks sequence homology with bacteriocins AS-48.

Bacteriocin uses components of the mannose phosphotransferase system (man-PTS) of susceptible cells as target/receptor. The immunity protein LciA forms a strong complex with the receptor proteins and the bacteriocin, thereby preventing cells from being killed. The complex between LciA and the man-PTS components (IIAB, IIC, and IID) appears to involve an on–off type mechanism that allows complex formation only in the presence of bacteriocin; otherwise no complexes were observed between LciA and the receptor proteins.
