= Lysostaphin =

Class of enzymes

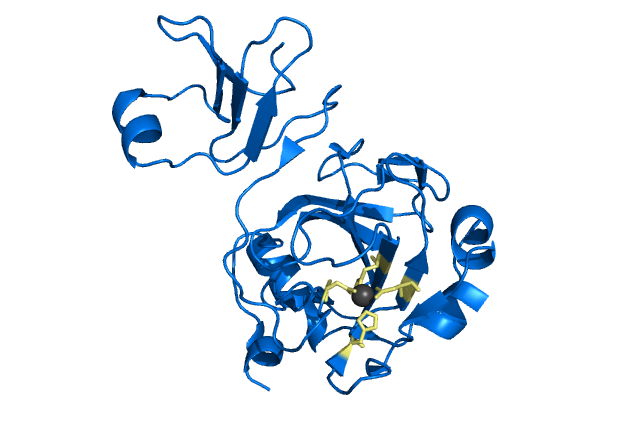

Identifiers
- EC no.: 3.4.24.75
- CAS no.: 9011-93-2

Databases
- BRENDA: enzyme data
- ExPASy: NiceZyme view
- KEGG: enzyme entry
- MetaCyc: metabolic pathway
- Rhea: reactions
- PDB structures: RCSB PDB PDBe PDBsum
Search
- PMC: articles
- PubMed: articles
- NCBI: proteins

Lysostaphin (EC 3.4.24.75, glycyl-glycine endopeptidase) is a Staphylococcus simulans metalloendopeptidase (crystal structure of lysostaphin). It can function as a bacteriocin (antimicrobial) against Staphylococcus aureus.

Lysostaphin is a 27 kDa glycylglycine endopeptidase, an antibacterial enzyme which is capable of cleaving the crosslinking pentaglycine bridges found in the cell wall peptidoglycan of certain staphylococci. Lysostaphin was first isolated from a culture of Staphylococcus simulans by Schindler and Schuhardt in 1964. S. aureus cell walls contain high proportions of pentaglycine, making lysostaphin a highly effective agent against both actively growing and quiescent bacteria.

Staphylococcal infections of both Staphylococcus aureus and Staphylococcus epidermidis continue to be a major issue in clinical settings, particularly those with implantable devices. Staphylococci cause a significant percentage of device infections, and like many other pathogens, rather than living as free planktonic cells within the host they have the ability to form a multilayered community of sessile bacteria cells known as a biofilm on implantable devices. Once a staphylococcal biofilm has formed on an implanted medical device, it is difficult to disrupt due to its antibiotic resistance and protection against bacterial action.

Many studies have been previously published on lysostaphin since its isolation, both in vitro and in vivo. Lysostaphin has been shown to eradicate susceptible S. aureus biofilms. It has also been reported to be effective in disrupting S. epidermidis biofilms in vitro, albeit at higher concentrations of the enzyme. Compared to commonly used antibiotics such as vancomycin, lysostaphin has been shown to demonstrate greater antibacterial activity in vitro. The enzyme has demonstrated effectiveness against methicillin susceptible S. aureus (MSSA) and methicillin resistant S. aureus (MRSA) mediated keratitis in vivo in a rabbit model. Additionally, it has been shown that lysostaphin combined with antimicrobials such as cefazolin, clarithromycin, doxycycline, levofloxacin, linezolid and quinuprisitin/dalfopristin has a synergistic effect for MSSA strains of the bacteria. A study published by Belyansky et al. illustrated that a lysostaphin bound mesh demonstrated dramatic preservation results in a rat model.

Using lyostaphin to treat staphylococcal biofilm associated infections may prove to be preferable to using antibiotics as it may be possible to administer the enzyme at relatively low doses and disrupt a staphylococcal biofilm, therefore eliminating the need for surgical removal of the infected device.
