= Sakacin =

Sakacins are bacteriocins produced by Lactobacillus sakei. They are often clustered with the other lactic acid bacteriocins. The best known sakacins are sakacin A, G, K, P, and Q. In particular, sakacin A and P have been well characterized.

== List of named sakacins ==
- Sakacin A is a small, 41 amino acid (the precursor is 90 aa), heat-stable polypeptide. It has been characterized genetically. The regulation of sakacin A has been shown to be related to pheromones (possibly quorum sensing) and temperature changes. It is identical to curvacin/curvaticin A.
- Sakacin B is a heat and pH stable protein.
- Sakacin G is a 37 amino acid long (small) polypeptide.
- Sakacin K is closely related to Sakacin A (and curvacin A), sharing the first 30 N-terminal amino acids. It has been studied extensively for its industrial applications.
- Sakacin M is a heat-resistant protein, MW = 4640.
- Sakacin P is a small, heat-stable, ribosomally synthesized polypeptide. Its genetics has been well-characterized.
- Sakacin Q was discovered in a strain producing Sakacin P.
- Sakacin R is very similar to sakacin P. It is 43 amino acids long, and is also known as sakacin 674.
- Sakacin T is a class II bacteriocin. It is produced from a single operon with sakacin X; there are three distinct promoters in the operon, the two sakacins are chemically distinct, though similar. Sakacin T
- Sakacin X is a class IIa bacteriocin. It appears in the references with Sakacin T (above).
- Sakacin Z was apparently never published and is known from a reference to unpublished data (refers to B. Ray, under Table 6, page 551)

The conventions governing the naming of sakacins are somewhat confused. Sakacin Z was named because it is produced by L. sakei Z, just as Sakacin 670 was named because it was produced by L. sakei 670; but the remaining naming convention uses letters A-Z, of which few are unambiguously available. Worse yet, many strains produce several sakacins so that naming them by strain is ambiguous.

== Applications of the Sakacins ==
Many of the sakacins have been tested for industrial applications and inserted into other lactic acid bacteria. Some have been engineered for production in food environments as well. Many were actually discovered in food contexts, like Greek dry cured sausage (sakacin B). In modern food chemistry, the sakacins have been studied for their use against Listeria in the production of sausages (like Portuguese lingüiça) and cured meat products (such as ham and cold cuts), cheeses, and other lactic acid fermented products. They are also used to repress unwanted bacterial growth that might cause ropiness, sliminess, malodor and other product defects.
