= Lantibiotics =

Class of chemical compounds

Gallidermin

Identifiers
- Symbol: Gallidermin
- Pfam: PF02052
- InterPro: IPR006079
- SCOP2: 1mqy / SCOPe / SUPFAM
- TCDB: 1.C.20
- OPM superfamily: 161
- OPM protein: 1mqy
Available protein structures:
- PDB: IPR006079 PF02052 (ECOD; PDBsum)
- AlphaFold: IPR006079; PF02052

Lantibiotics (Lanthipeptides) are a class of polycyclic peptide antibiotics that contain the characteristic thioether amino acids lanthionine or methyllanthionine, as well as the unsaturated amino acids dehydroalanine, and 2-aminoisobutyric acid. They belong to ribosomally synthesized and post-translationally modified peptides.

Lanthionine is composed of two alanine residues that are crosslinked on their β-carbon atoms by a thioether (monosulfide) linkage.

Lantibiotics are produced by a large number of Gram-positive bacteria such as Streptococcus and Streptomyces to attack other Gram-positive bacteria, and as such, they are considered a member of the bacteriocins. Bacteriocins are classified according to their extent of posttranslational modification. The lantibiotics are a class of more extensively modified bacteriocins, also called Class I bacteriocins. (Bacteriocins for which disulfide bonds are the only modification to the peptide are Class II bacteriocins.)

Lantibiotics are well studied because of the commercial use of these bacteria in the food industry for making dairy products such as cheese.

Nisin and epidermin are members of a family of lantibiotics that bind to lipid II, a cell wall precursor lipid component of target bacteria and disrupt cell wall production. The genetic capacity to produce nisin is more widespread than previously thought with over bacterial 100 species predicted to encode the genes to produce the peptide. The duramycin family of lantibiotics binds phosphoethanolamine in the membranes of its target cells and seem to disrupt several physiological functions.

== History ==
The name lantibiotics was introduced in 1988 as an abbreviation for "lanthionine-containing peptide antibiotics". The first structures of these antimicrobial agents were produced by pioneering work by Gross and Morell in the late 1960s and early 1970s, thus marking the formal introduction of lantibiotics. Since then, lantibiotics such as nisin have been used auspiciously for food preservation and have yet to encounter significant bacterial resistance. These attributes of lantibiotics have led to more detailed research into their structures and biosynthetic pathways.

== Classification ==
- Type A lantibiotics are long flexible molecules - e.g., nisin, bisin, subtilin, epidermin, gallidermin Subgroup AI includes mutacin II; subgroup AII includes mutacin I and III.
- Type B lantibiotics are globular - e.g., mersacidin. actagardine, duramycin, and cinnamycin.

Some contain 2 peptides, e.g. haloduracin.

=== Examples ===
Lantibiotic	Type	# of residues	# of thioether links	Other links	refs
nisin subtilin	A	34	5	0	
gallidermin epidermin	A	21	3	1	
mersacidin	B	20	4		
actagardine	B	19	4	0	
cinnamycin duramycin	B	19	3	1	
sublancin 168	?	37	1	2	
plantaricin C	B	27	4	0	

(Sublancin may be an S-linked glycopeptide).

== Biosynthesis ==
They are synthesised with a leader polypeptide sequence that is removed only during the transport of the molecule out of the synthesising cell. They are synthesized by ribosomes, which distinguishes them from most natural antibiotics. There are four known enzymes (lanthipeptide synthetases) responsible for producing lanthionine rings.

== Mechanism of action ==
Lantibiotics show substantial specificity for some components (e.g., lipid II) of bacterial cell membranes especially of Gram-positive bacteria. Type A lantibiotics kill rapidly by pore formation, type B lantibiotics inhibit peptidoglycan biosynthesis. They are active in very low concentrations.

== Application ==
=== Food preservation ===
Lantibiotics are produced by Gram-positive bacteria and show strong antimicrobial action toward a wide range of other Gram-positive bacteria. As such, they have become attractive candidates for use in food preservation (by inhibiting pathogens that cause food spoilage) and the pharmaceutical industry (to prevent or fight infections in humans or animals).

=== Clinical antibiotic ===
One type known as B lantibiotic NVB302 entered phase 1 clinical trials in 2011 for use against Clostridioides difficile, and reported good results in 2012.

== Databases ==
BACTIBASE is an open-access database for bacteriocins including lantibiotics. LANTIBASE is a lantibiotic specific resource.
