= Class II bacteriocin =

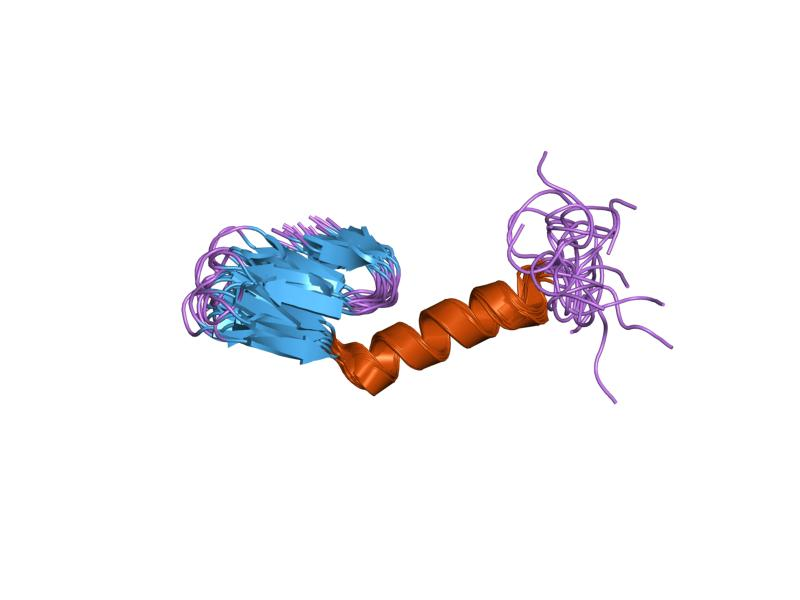
- Three-dimensional structure of leucocin A, a type IIa bacteriocin.

Identifiers
- Symbol: Bacteriocin_II
- Pfam: PF01721
- InterPro: IPR002633
- PROSITE: PDOC60030
- SCOP2: 3leu / SCOPe / SUPFAM
- TCDB: 1.C.24
- OPM superfamily: 141
- OPM protein: 1ohm
Available protein structures:
- PDB: IPR002633 PF01721 (ECOD; PDBsum)
- AlphaFold: IPR002633; PF01721

Class II bacteriocins are a class of small peptides that inhibit the growth of various bacteria.

Many Gram-positive bacteria produce ribosomally synthesized antimicrobial peptides, termed bacteriocins.

Bacteriocins for which disulfide bonds are the only modification to the peptide are Class II bacteriocins.

== Class IIa ==
One important and well studied class of bacteriocins is the class IIa or pediocin-like bacteriocins produced by lactic acid bacteria. All class IIa bacteriocins are produced by food-associated strains, isolated from a variety of food products of industrial and natural origins, including meat products, dairy products and vegetables. Class IIa bacteriocins are all cationic, display anti-Listeria activity, and kill target cells by permeabilizing the cell membrane.

Class IIa bacteriocins contain between 37 and 48 residues. Based on their primary structures, the peptide chains of class IIa bacteriocins may be divided roughly into two regions: a hydrophilic, cationic and highly conserved N-terminal region, and a less conserved hydrophobic/amphiphilic C-terminal region. The N-terminal region contains the conserved Y-G-N-G-V/L 'pediocin box' motif and two conserved cysteine residues joined by a disulfide bridge. It forms a three-stranded antiparallel beta-sheet supported by the conserved disulfide bridge. This cationic N-terminal beta-sheet domain mediates binding of the class IIa bacteriocin to the target cell membrane. The C-terminal region forms a hairpin-like domain that penetrates into the hydrophobic part of the target cell membrane, thereby mediating leakage through the membrane. The two domains are joined by a hinge, which enables movement of the domains relative to each other.

Some proteins known to belong to the class IIa bacteriocin family are listed below:

- Pediococcus acidilactici pediocin PA-1.
- Leuconostoc mesenteroides mesentericin Y105.
- Carnobacterium piscicola carnobacteriocin B2.
- Lactobacillus sakei sakacin P.
- Enterococcus faecium enterocin A.
- Enterococcus faecium enterocin P.
- Leuconostoc gelidum leucocin A.
- Lactobacillus curvatus curvacin A.
- Listeria innocua listeriocin 743A.

== Class IIb ==
Class IIb bacteriocin

Identifiers
- Symbol: Antimicrobial17
- Pfam: PF08129
- Pfam clan: CL0400
- InterPro: IPR012950
- TCDB: 1.C.25
- OPM superfamily: 219
- OPM protein: 2jpj
Available protein structures:
- PDB: IPR012950 PF08129 (ECOD; PDBsum)
- AlphaFold: IPR012950; PF08129

The class IIb bacteriocins (two-peptide bacteriocins) require two different peptides for activity. It includes the alpha enterocins and lactococcin G peptides. These peptides have some antimicrobial properties; they inhibit the growth of Enterococcus spp. and a few other Gram-positive bacteria. The peptides act as pore-forming toxins that create cell membrane channels through a barrel-stave mechanism and thus produce an ionic imbalance in the cell

== Class IIc ==
Bacteriocin_IIc
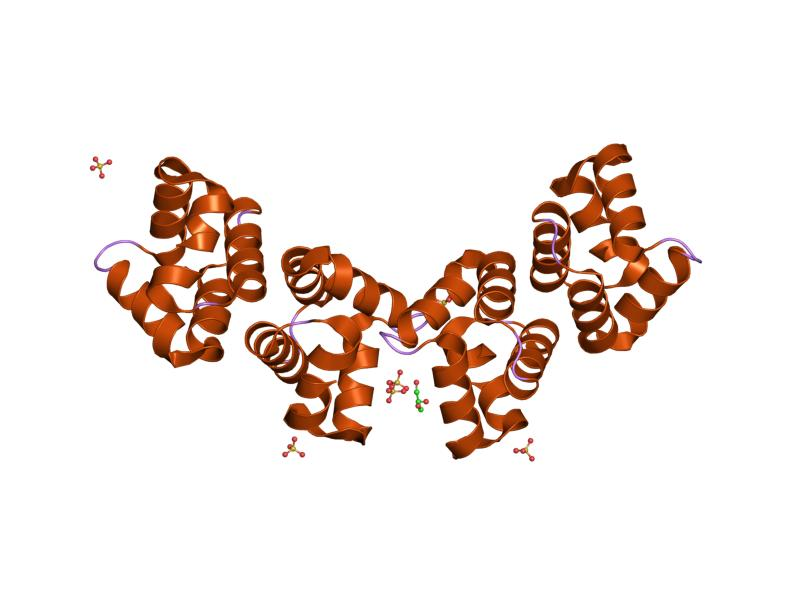
- x-ray structure of bacteriocin as-48 at ph 4.5. sulphate bound form

Identifiers
- Symbol: Bacteriocin_IIc
- Pfam: PF09221
- InterPro: IPR009086
- SCOP2: 1o82 / SCOPe / SUPFAM
- TCDB: 1.C.28
- OPM superfamily: 77
- OPM protein: 1o82
Available protein structures:
- PDB: IPR009086 PF09221 (ECOD; PDBsum)
- AlphaFold: IPR009086; PF09221

Other class II bacteriocins can be grouped together as Class IIc (circular bacteriocins). These have a wide range of effects on membrane permeability, cell wall formation and pheromone actions of target cells. In particular, Bacteriocin AS-48 is a cyclic peptide antibiotic produced by the eubacteria Enterococcus faecalis (Streptococcus faecalis) that shows a broad antimicrobial spectrum against both Gram-positive and Gram-negative bacteria. Bacteriocin AS-48 is encoded by the pheromone-responsive plasmid pMB2, and acts on the plasma membrane in which it opens pores leading to ion leakage and cell death. The globular structure of bacteriocin AS-48 consists of five alpha helices enclosing a hydrophobic core. The mammalian NK-lysin effector protein of T and natural killer cells has a similar structure, though it lacks sequence homology with bacteriocins AS-48.

== Class IId ==
Class IId bacteriocins are single-peptide bacteriocins.

Pfam	Pfam symbol	InterPro	InterPro symbol
PF08129	Antimicrobial17	InterPro: IPR012950	Alpha_enterocin/lactococcin
PF01721	Bacteriocin_II	InterPro: IPR002633	Bacteriocin_IIa
PF10439	Bacteriocin_IIc	InterPro: IPR019493	Bacteriocin_IIb_lactacin-rel
PF12173	BacteriocIIc_cy	InterPro: IPR020970	Bacteriocin_IIc
PF04369	Lactococcin	InterPro: IPR007464	Bacteriocin_IId
PF04604	L_biotic_typeA	InterPro: IPR007682	Lantibiotic_typ-A_Lactobact
