= Cerein =

Cereins are a group of bacteriocins produced by various strains of the bacterium Bacillus cereus. Although all cereins are by definition produced by B. cereus, it is possible that they are chemically quite different from one another. Cereins have been found to be active against other strains of B. cereus, as well as a broad range of other gram-positive bacteria. Like other bacteriocins, cereins are generally named after the strain in which their production was first discovered. Named cereins include cerein 7, cerein 7B, cerein 8A, and cerein MRX1.

== Clinical research ==
It has been studies that a type of cerein 8A is very effective in inhibiting the effects of the pathogenic bacteria Salmonella enterica subsp. enterica that causes diarrhea, stomach aches, and fever. In clinical research, it was discovered that cerein 8A in combination with combination with sodium lactate killed Salmonella enterica in a dose-dependent fashion. Cerein 8A was also found to inhibit growth of Listeria monocytogenes, a pathogenic bacteria commonly found in dairy products such as milk. Cerein 8A at 1600 AU ml^{−1} has a significant inhibitory effect on Bacillus cereus spores.
