= Mutacin 1140 =

Names
- Systematic IUPAC name L-Phenylalanyl-L-lysyl-D-cysteinyl-L-tryptophyl-2,3-didehydroalanyl-L-leucyl-L-cysteinyl-(2S)-2-amino-3-mercaptobutanoyl-L-prolylglycyl-L-cysteinyl-L-alanyl-L-arginyl-(2Z)-2-amino-2-butenoylglycyl-D-cysteinyl-L-phenylalanyl-L-asparaginyl-D-cysteinyl-L-tyrosyl-N-[(1Z)-2-mercaptoethenyl]-L-cysteinamide, cyclic (3→7),(8→11),(16→21^{3}),(19→21^{1})-tetrakis(thioether)
- Other names MU1140

Identifiers
CAS Number	218133-96-1
3D model (JSmol)	Interactive image
- InChI: InChI=1S/C103H138N28O22S4/c1-7-64(87(138)112-46-81(133)116-74-50-155-49-73-88(139)109-36-38-154-48-75(98(149)123-70(94(145)126-73)42-60-27-15-10-16-28-60)128-95(146)72(44-80(106)132)125-93(144)69(122-97(74)148)41-59-25-13-9-14-26-59)118-89(140)67(32-21-35-110-103(107)108)119-84(135)55(4)115-96(147)78-53-157-57(6)83(102(153)131-37-22-33-79(131)101(152)113-47-82(134)117-78)130-100(151)77-52-156-51-76(127-90(141)66(31-19-20-34-104)120-86(137)63(105)40-58-23-11-8-12-24-58)99(150)124-71(43-61-45-111-65-30-18-17-29-62(61)65)91(142)114-56(5)85(136)121-68(39-54(2)3)92(143)129-77/h7-18,23-30,36,38,45,54-55,57,63,66-79,83,111H,5,19-22,31-35,37,39-44,46-53,104-105H2,1-4,6H3,(H2,106,132)(H,109,139)(H,112,138)(H,113,152)(H,114,142)(H,115,147)(H,116,133)(H,117,134)(H,118,140)(H,119,135)(H,120,137)(H,121,136)(H,122,148)(H,123,149)(H,124,150)(H,125,144)(H,126,145)(H,127,141)(H,128,146)(H,129,143)(H,130,151)(H4,107,108,110)/b38-36-,64-7-/t55-,57-,63-,66-,67-,68-,69-,70-,71-,72-,73-,74+,75+,76+,77-,78+,79-,83+/m0/s1 Key: XOQVQZFPAOZCQH-MCOZRTNASA-N
- SMILES: C\C=C(/NC(=O)[C@H](CCCNC(N)=N)NC(=O)[C@H](C)NC(=O)[C@H]1CS[C@@H](C)[C@@H](NC(=O)[C@@H]2CSC[C@@H](NC(=O)[C@H](CCCCN)NC(=O)[C@@H](N)CC3=CC=CC=C3)C(=O)N[C@@H](CC3=CNC4=CC=CC=C34)C(=O)NC(=C)C(=O)N[C@@H](CC(C)C)C(=O)N2)C(=O)N2CCC[C@H]2C(=O)NCC(=O)N1)C(=O)NCC(=O)N[C@@H]1CSC[C@@H]2NC(=O)[C@H](CC3=CC=CC=C3)NC(=O)[C@@H](CS\C=C/NC2=O)NC(=O)[C@H](CC(N)=O)NC(=O)[C@H](CC2=CC=CC=C2)NC1=O

Properties
Chemical formula	C_{103}H_{138}N_{28}O_{23}S_{4}
Molar mass	2264.65 g·mol^{−1}
- Except where otherwise noted, data are given for materials in their standard state (at 25 °C [77 °F], 100 kPa). Infobox references

Mutacin 1140 is a bacteriocin produced by Streptococcus mutans. It has activity against a broad spectrum of Gram-positive bacteria. It is a member of the class of compounds known as lantibiotics.

Mutacin 1140 belongs to the epidermin subset of type Al lantibiotics. Molecules belonging to this family bind to lipid II which is a precursor to bacterial cell wall synthesis.

While the effects mutacin 1140 has against gram-positive bacteria are known, it remains difficult to study due to it demonstrating poor pharmacokinetics. Besides the poor pharmacokinetics, it is easily vulnerable to proteolytic degradation by interfering with the protein's peptide bonds.
