= André Paillot =

French entomologist (1885–1944)

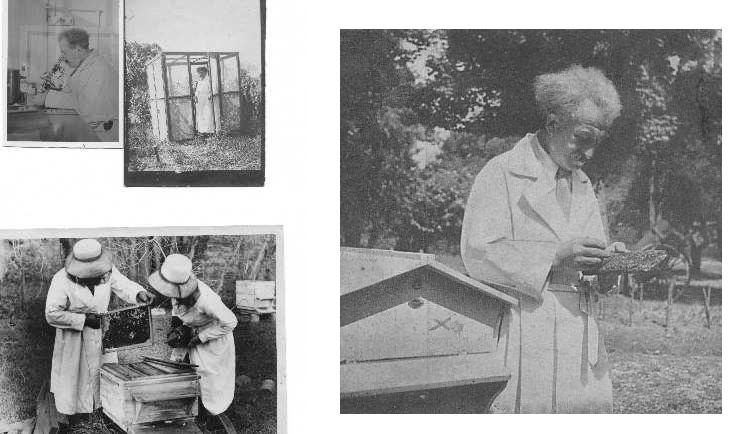
- André Paillot
- Born: 8 August 1885
- Died: 22 December 1944 (aged 59)
- Known for: Insect pathology
- Scientific career
- Fields: Entomology

André Paillot (8 August 1885 – 22 December 1944) was a French entomologist known for his pioneering work on the pathology of insects. His contributions and achievements had a significant influence on the studies of insect diseases.

André Paillot was born on 8 August 1885 in Bois-de-Gand, France. From 1907 to 1911 he studied natural science in Besançon and quickly became interested in entomology. In 1911 he worked with a prominent French entomologist, Paul Marchal, performing field studies on grape insect pests. He received additional training at the Pasteur Institute in Paris. He fought in World War I and was badly wounded. At the end of the war he was appointed director of the Southeastern Entomological Station near Lyon and headed the station until his death on 22 December 1944.

He published more than 160 papers on insect pathology. He also wrote the first textbook on insect pathology, L´infection chez les insects (1933).

== Sources ==
- Jehle, Johannes A (Jul 2009). "André Paillot (1885–1944): his work lives on". Journal of Invertebrate Pathology. 101 (3): 162–8. doi:10.1016/j.jip.2009.03.009. PMID 19460383.
- "Founder's Lecture: André Paillot" (PDF). Society for Invertebrate Pathology Newsletter. 41 (3): 9. 2008.
