= Dehydroalanine =

- Structural formula

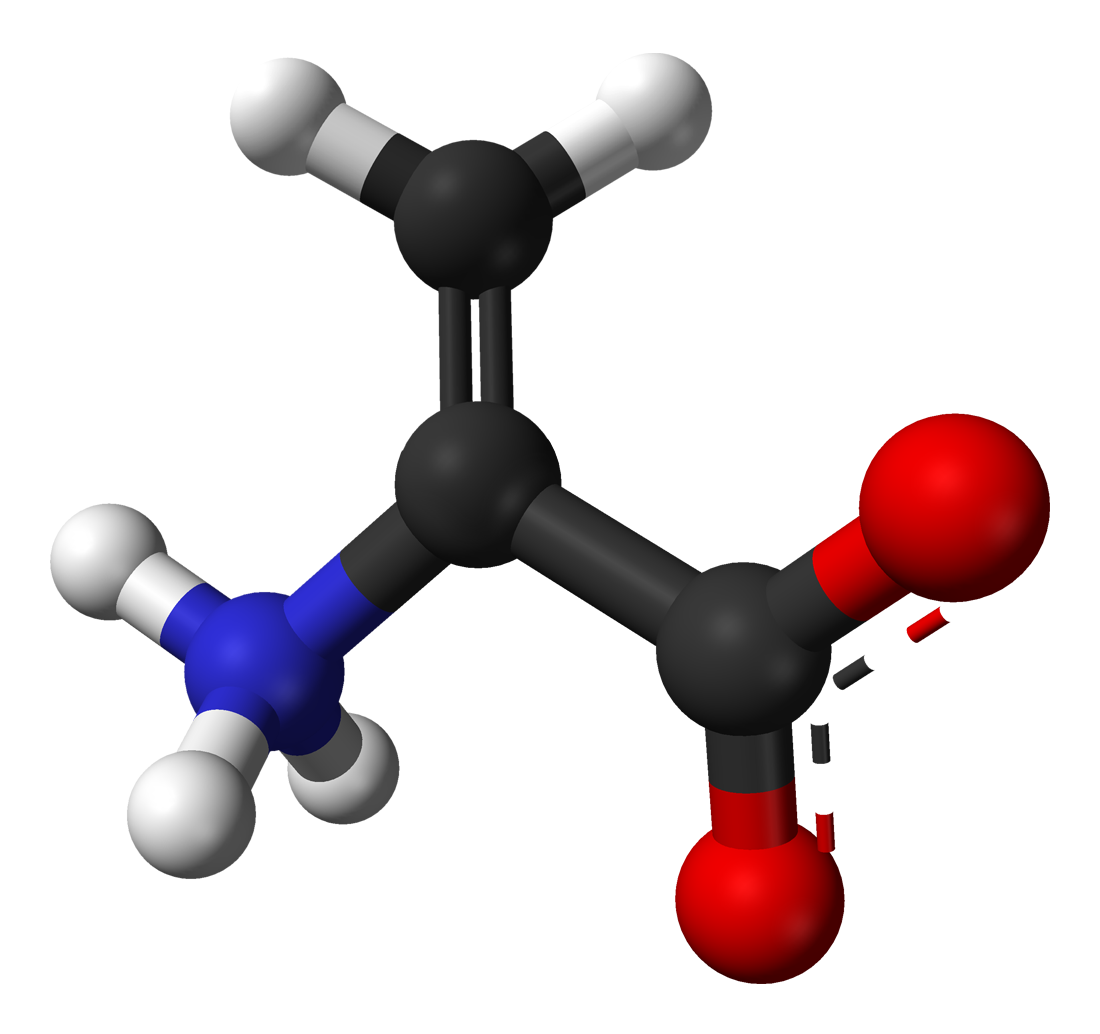
- Ball-and-stick model of the zwitterion

Names
- Preferred IUPAC name 2-Aminoprop-2-enoic acid
- Other names Cα,β-didehydroalanine, α,β-didehydroalanine, 2-aminoacrylate, 2,3-didehydroalanine

Identifiers
CAS Number	1948-56-7
3D model (JSmol)	Interactive image; Interactive image
ChEBI	CHEBI:17123
ChemSpider	110510
DrugBank	DB02688
KEGG	C02218
PubChem CID	123991
UNII	98RA387EKY
CompTox Dashboard (EPA)	DTXSID90173131
- InChI: InChI=1S/C3H5NO2/c1-2(4)3(5)6/h1,4H2,(H,5,6) Key: UQBOJOOOTLPNST-UHFFFAOYSA-N; InChI=1/C3H5NO2/c1-2(4)3(5)6/h1,4H2,(H,5,6) Key: UQBOJOOOTLPNST-UHFFFAOYAW
- SMILES: C=C(C(=O)O)N; O=C(O)C(=C)N

Properties
Chemical formula	C_{3}H_{5}NO_{2}
Molar mass	87.08 g/mol
- Except where otherwise noted, data are given for materials in their standard state (at 25 °C [77 °F], 100 kPa). verify (what is ?) Infobox references

Dehydroalanine is an organic compound with the formula CH_{2}=CH(NH_{2})CO_{2}H. It does not exist in its free form, but it occurs naturally as a residue found in peptides of microbial origin. Unlike most amino acid residues, it has an unsaturated backbone.

== Structure and reactivity ==
Like most primary enamines, dehydroalanine is unstable. It would hydrolyze to pyruvate:

CH_{2}=CH(NH_{2})CO_{2}H + H_{2}O → CH_{3}−C(O)CO_{2}H + NH_{3}

N-Acylated derivatives of dehydroalanine, such as are found peptides and related compounds, are stable. One such example is methyl 2-acetamidoacrylate. As a residue in a peptide, dehydroalanine is generated by a post translational modification. The required precursors are serine or cysteine residues, which undergo enzyme-mediated loss of water and hydrogen sulfide, respectively.

Most amino acid residues are unreactive toward nucleophiles, but those containing dehydroalanine or some other dehydroamino acids are exceptions. These residues are electrophilic due to the α,β-unsaturated carbonyl, and can, for example, alkylate other amino acids. This activity has made DHA useful synthetically to prepare lanthionine.

== Occurrence ==
Dehydroalanine had been proposed as early as 1937, but it was established by analysis of the reactions of base with glutathione. Alkaline degradation of cystine-containing peptides and proteins was shown to give derivatives containing lanthionine and lysinoalanine. N-acetyldehydroglycine was also shown to add amines.

The dehydroalanine residue was first detected in nisin, a cyclic peptide with antimicrobial activity. Dehydroalanine is also present in some lantibiotics and microcystins.

DHA can be formed from cysteine or serine by simple base catalysis without the need for an enzyme, which can happen during cooking and alkaline food preparation processes. It can then alkylate other amino acid residues, such as lysine, forming lysinoalanine cross-links and racemization of the original alanine. The resulting proteins have lower nutritional quality for some species but higher nutritional quality for others. Some lysinoalanines may also cause kidney enlargement in rats.

Many dehydroalanine-containing peptides are toxic.

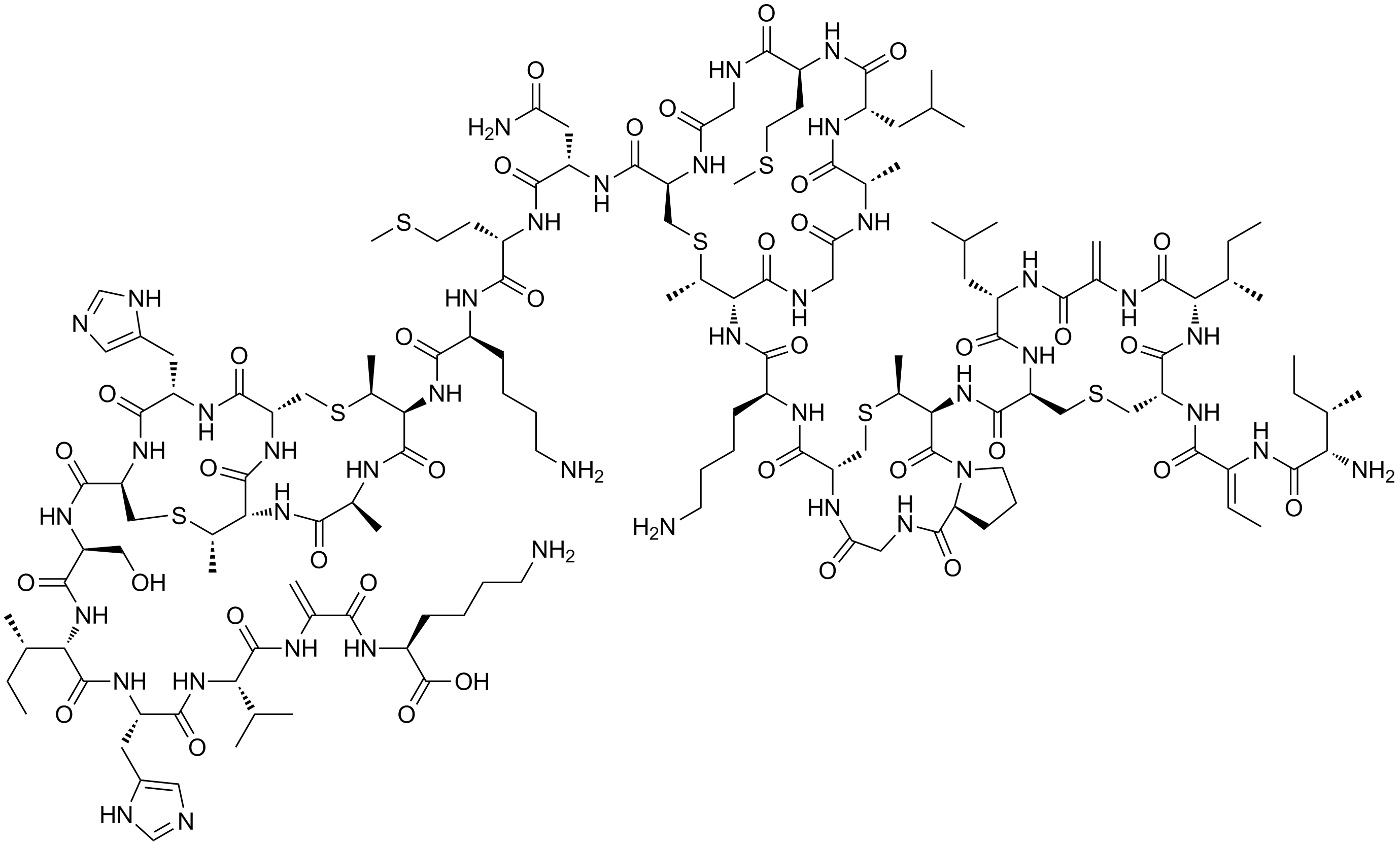
The antimicrobial bacteriocin nisin contains three dehydro amino acid residues, two of which are dehydroalanine residues.

A dehydroalanine residue was long thought to be an important electrophilic catalytic residue in histidine ammonia-lyase and phenylalanine ammonia-lyase enzymes, but the active residue was later found instead to be a different unsaturated alanine derivative — 3,5-dihydro-5-methyldiene-4H-imidazol-4-one — that is even more electrophilic.

== Chemical synthesis ==
N-Acyl dehydroalanine derivatives have been synthesized by dehydration of serines using a tert-butoxycarbonate leaving group, or by conversion of cysteine derivatives using various reagents for the elimination of the Thiol-group. Various protected dehydroamino acids can be produced by electrochemical oxidation of the respective amino acid derivative in methanol.

Dehydroalanine derivatives have proven to be useful in late-stage peptide modification, enabling straightforward synthesis of functionally diverse peptides or proteins.
