= Streptomyces cinnamoneus =

Scientific classification
- Domain: Bacteria
- Kingdom: Bacillati
- Phylum: Actinomycetota
- Class: Actinomycetes
- Order: Streptomycetales
- Family: Streptomycetaceae
- Genus: Streptomyces
- Species: S. cinnamoneus

Binomial name
- Streptomyces cinnamoneus (Benedict et al. 1952) Witt and Stackebrandt 1991

Type strain
- AS 4.1084, AS 4.1706, ATCC 11874, ATCC 23897, BCRC (formerly CCRC) 12169, BCRC 12169, Benedict A-725, CBS 293.64, CBS 683.68, CCRC 12169, CCUG 11122, CECT 3258, CGMCC 4.1084, CIP 108152, DPDU 0093, DSM 40005, DSM 41431, ETH 13 355, ETH 13355, ETH 23996, Gordon 3664, HAMBI 1067, HMGB B904, IFO (now NBRC) 12852, IFO 12852, IMET 41381, IMRU 3664, IPV 1776, IPV 2013, IPV 936, ISP 5005, JCM 4152, JCM 4633, KCC S-0152, KCC S-0633, KCC S-0663, KCC S-0663 or KCC S-0633, KCCS-0663, LMG 5971, LMG 8602, NBRC 12852, NCB 93, NCIB 8851, NCIMB 8851, NRRL B-1285, NRRL-ISP 5005, PSA 85, R Locci, RGB A-725, RIA 1102, RIA 360, VKM Ac-876, Waksman 3664

Subspecies
- subsp. albosporus (Thirumalachar 1968) Witt and Stackebrandt 1991; subsp. "azacoluta" Labeda 1996; subsp. cinnamoneus (Benedict et al. 1952) Witt and Stackebrandt 1991; subsp. "sparsus" Rahalkar and Thirumalachar 1968

Synonyms
- "Streptomyces cinnamoneus" Benedict et al. 1952; "Streptomyces griseoverticillatus" Shinobu and Shimada 1962; Streptomyces griseoverticillatus (Shinobu and Shimada 1962) Witt and Stackebrandt 1991; "Streptomyces hachijoensis" Hosoya et al. 1952; Streptomyces hachijoensis (Hosoya et al. 1952) Witt and Stackebrandt 1991; Streptomyces sapporonensis (Locci and Schofield 1989) Witt and Stackebrandt 1991; Streptoverticillium cinnamoneum (Benedict et al. 1952) Baldacci et al. 1966 (Approved Lists 1980); Streptoverticillium griseoverticillatum (Shinobu and Shimada 1962) Locci et al. 1969 (Approved Lists 1980); Streptoverticillium hachijoense (Hosoya et al. 1952) Locci et al. 1969 (Approved Lists 1980); Streptoverticillium sapporonense (ex Sakai and Miyoshi 1972) Locci and Schofield 1989

Species of bacterium

Streptomyces cinnamoneus is a bacterium species from the genus of Streptomyces which has been isolated from soil in Japan. Streptomyces cinnamoneus produces duramycin A, duramycin B, duramycin C, carbomycin, cinnomycin and fungichromin.

== See also ==
- List of Streptomyces species
