= Nisin =

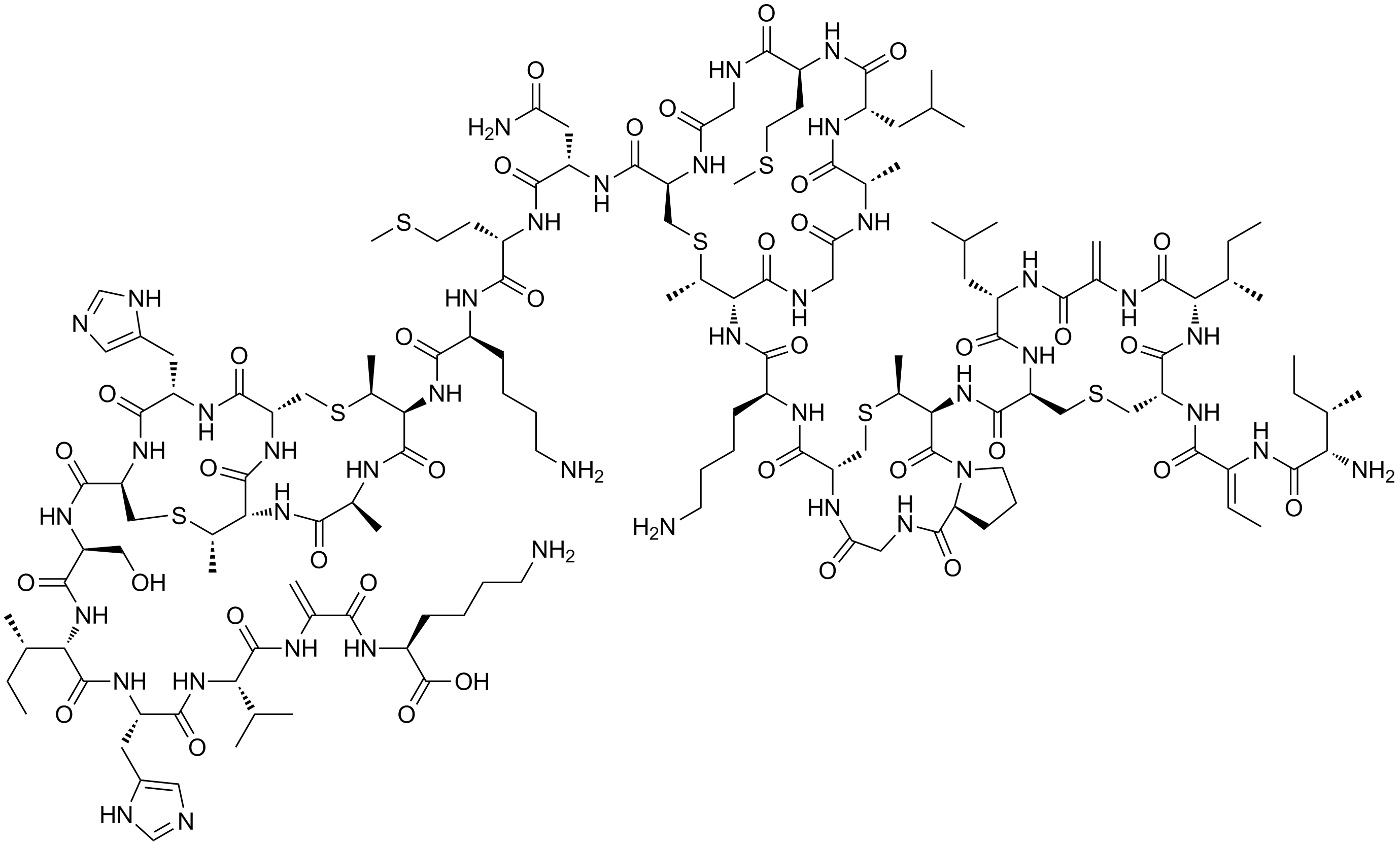

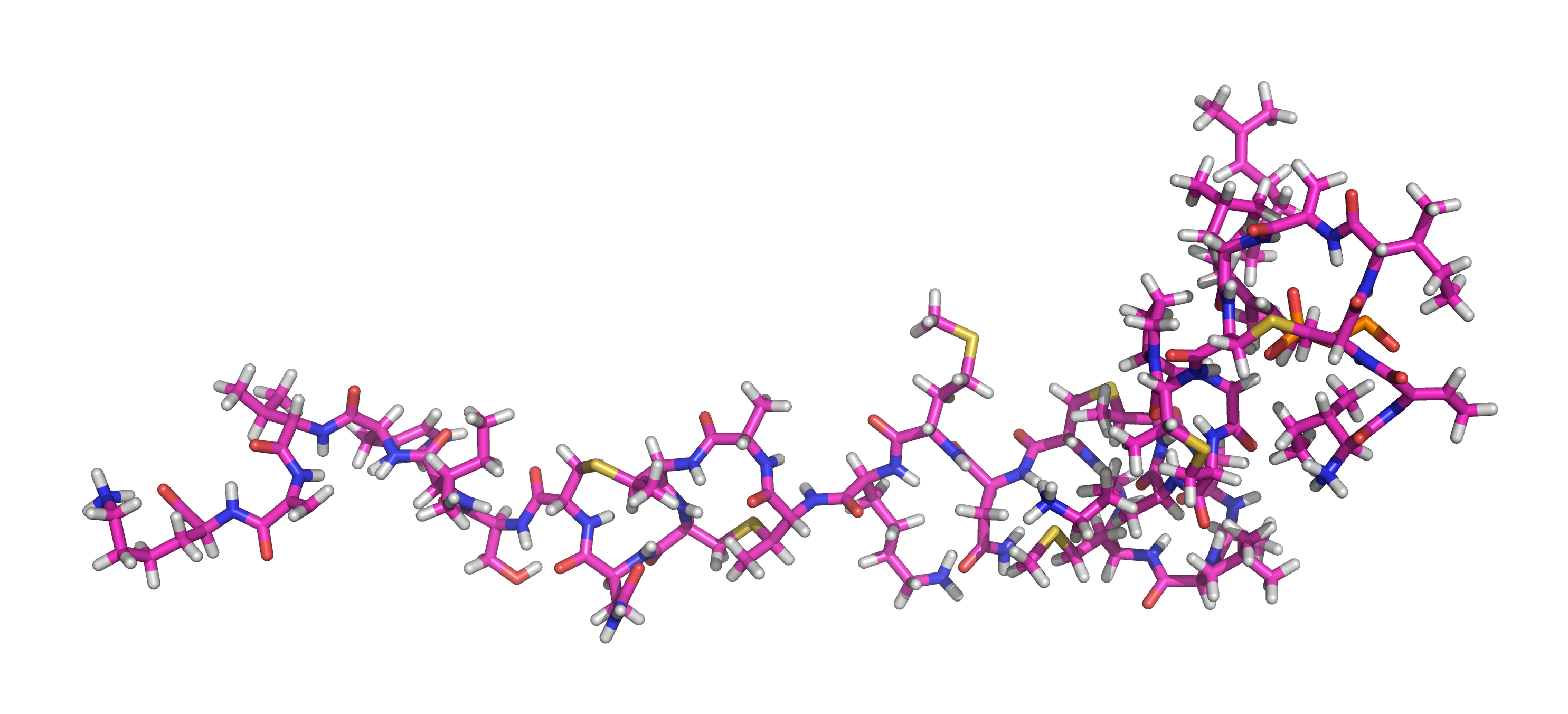

Identifiers
CAS Number	1414-45-5
3D model (JSmol)	Interactive image
ChEBI	CHEBI:71629
ChEMBL	ChEMBL526744
ChemSpider	21106355
ECHA InfoCard	100.014.370
E number	E234 (preservatives)
PubChem CID	16219761
UNII	EN8XKG133D
CompTox Dashboard (EPA)	DTXSID20893678
- InChI: InChI=1S/C143H246N42O45S7/c1-22-68(10)104(148)134(220)183-111(76(18)193)140(226)173-93(57-189)127(213)179-107(70(12)24-3)138(224)172-91(55-187)125(211)166-86(45-66(6)7)120(206)175-98(62-235)132(218)184-112(77(19)194)142(228)185-41-31-35-99(185)133(219)152-53-103(198)158-94(58-231)128(214)161-81(33-26-29-39-145)117(203)181-108(73(15)190)135(221)153-51-101(196)156-71(13)113(199)165-85(44-65(4)5)119(205)162-82(36-42-236-20)115(201)151-52-102(197)159-95(59-232)129(215)168-89(48-100(147)195)122(208)163-83(37-43-237-21)116(202)160-80(32-25-28-38-144)118(204)182-109(74(16)191)139(225)157-72(14)114(200)180-110(75(17)192)141(227)176-97(61-234)130(216)167-87(46-78-49-149-63-154-78)121(207)174-96(60-233)131(217)170-92(56-188)126(212)178-106(69(11)23-2)137(223)169-88(47-79-50-150-64-155-79)123(209)177-105(67(8)9)136(222)171-90(54-186)124(210)164-84(143(229)230)34-27-30-40-146/h49-50,63-77,80-99,104-112,186-194,231-235H,22-48,51-62,144-146,148H2,1-21H3,(H2,147,195)(H,149,154)(H,150,155)(H,151,201)(H,152,219)(H,153,221)(H,156,196)(H,157,225)(H,158,198)(H,159,197)(H,160,202)(H,161,214)(H,162,205)(H,163,208)(H,164,210)(H,165,199)(H,166,211)(H,167,216)(H,168,215)(H,169,223)(H,170,217)(H,171,222)(H,172,224)(H,173,226)(H,174,207)(H,175,206)(H,176,227)(H,177,209)(H,178,212)(H,179,213)(H,180,200)(H,181,203)(H,182,204)(H,183,220)(H,184,218)(H,229,230) Key: WAMGWAJCUSJZNI-UHFFFAOYSA-N; InChI=1/C143H246N42O45S7/c1-22-68(10)104(148)134(220)183-111(76(18)193)140(226)173-93(57-189)127(213)179-107(70(12)24-3)138(224)172-91(55-187)125(211)166-86(45-66(6)7)120(206)175-98(62-235)132(218)184-112(77(19)194)142(228)185-41-31-35-99(185)133(219)152-53-103(198)158-94(58-231)128(214)161-81(33-26-29-39-145)117(203)181-108(73(15)190)135(221)153-51-101(196)156-71(13)113(199)165-85(44-65(4)5)119(205)162-82(36-42-236-20)115(201)151-52-102(197)159-95(59-232)129(215)168-89(48-100(147)195)122(208)163-83(37-43-237-21)116(202)160-80(32-25-28-38-144)118(204)182-109(74(16)191)139(225)157-72(14)114(200)180-110(75(17)192)141(227)176-97(61-234)130(216)167-87(46-78-49-149-63-154-78)121(207)174-96(60-233)131(217)170-92(56-188)126(212)178-106(69(11)23-2)137(223)169-88(47-79-50-150-64-155-79)123(209)177-105(67(8)9)136(222)171-90(54-186)124(210)164-84(143(229)230)34-27-30-40-146/h49-50,63-77,80-99,104-112,186-194,231-235H,22-48,51-62,144-146,148H2,1-21H3,(H2,147,195)(H,149,154)(H,150,155)(H,151,201)(H,152,219)(H,153,221)(H,156,196)(H,157,225)(H,158,198)(H,159,197)(H,160,202)(H,161,214)(H,162,205)(H,163,208)(H,164,210)(H,165,199)(H,166,211)(H,167,216)(H,168,215)(H,169,223)(H,170,217)(H,171,222)(H,172,224)(H,173,226)(H,174,207)(H,175,206)(H,176,227)(H,177,209)(H,178,212)(H,179,213)(H,180,200)(H,181,203)(H,182,204)(H,183,220)(H,184,218)(H,229,230) Key: WAMGWAJCUSJZNI-UHFFFAOYAB
- SMILES: C[C@H](CC)[C@@H](N)C(N/C(C(N[C@@H]1C(N[C@@H](C(NC(C(N[C@@H](C(N[C@@H](C(N[C@H](C(N2[C@@H](C(NC3)=O)CCC2)=O)[C@@H](C)SC[C@H](C(N[C@H](CCCCN)C(N[C@H](C(NCC(N[C@@H](C(N[C@H](CC(C)C)C(N[C@H](CCSC)C(NCC(N[C@@H](C(N[C@H](CC(N)=O)C(N[C@H](CCSC)C(N[C@H](CCCCN)C(N[C@@H]([C@@H](C)SC[C@@H](N6)C(N[C@H](CC5=CN=CN5)C(N[C@@H](C(N[C@H](CO)C(N[C@H]([C@@H](CC)C)C(N[C@H](CC8=CN=CN8)C(N[C@H]([C@@H](C)C)C(NC(C(N[C@H](CCCCN)C(O)=O)=O)=C)=O)=O)=O)=O)=O)CS[C@H](C)[C@H]7C6=O)=O)=O)C(N[C@H](C)C(N7)=O)=O)=O)=O)=O)=O)CS4)=O)=O)=O)=O)C)=O)=O)[C@H]4C)=O)=O)NC3=O)=O)CSC1)=O)CC(C)C)=O)=C)=O)[C@H](C)CC)=O)=O)=C\C)=O

Properties
Chemical formula	C_{143}H_{230}N_{42}O_{37}S_{7}
Molar mass	3354.07 g/mol
Appearance	powder
Density	1.402 g/mL
Boiling point	2,966 °C (5,371 °F; 3,239 K)
- Except where otherwise noted, data are given for materials in their standard state (at 25 °C [77 °F], 100 kPa). verify (what is ?) Infobox references

Nisin is a polycyclic antibacterial peptide produced by the bacterium Lactococcus lactis that is used as a food preservative. It has 34 amino acid residues, including the uncommon amino acids lanthionine (Lan), methyllanthionine (MeLan), didehydroalanine (Dha), and didehydroaminobutyric acid (Dhb). These unusual amino acids are introduced by posttranslational modification of the precursor peptide. In these reactions a ribosomally synthesized 57-mer is converted to the final peptide. The unsaturated amino acids originate from serine and threonine, and the enzyme-catalysed addition of cysteine residues to the didehydro amino acids result in the multiple (5) thioether bridges.

Subtilin and epidermin are related to nisin. All are members of a class of molecules known as lantibiotics. A recent study has highlighted that the genetic capacity to produce nisin is more widespread than previously thought with over 100 species predicted to encode the genes to produce the peptide.

In the food industry, nisin is obtained from the culturing of L. lactis on natural substrates, such as dextrose, and it is not chemically synthesized.

It was originally isolated in the late 1930s, and produced since the 1950s as Nisaplin from naturally occurring sources by Aplin and Barrett in laboratories in Beaminster in Dorset (now owned by International Flavors & Fragrances), and approved as an additive for food use in the US in the late 1960s.

== Properties ==
While most bacteriocins generally inhibit only closely related species, nisin is a rare example of a "broad-spectrum" bacteriocin effective against many Gram-positive organisms, including lactic acid bacteria (commonly associated with avoiding food spoilage), Listeria monocytogenes (a known pathogen), Staphylococcus aureus, Bacillus cereus, Clostridium botulinum, etc. It is also particularly effective against spores. Gram-negative bacteria are protected by their outer membrane but may become susceptible to nisin action after a heat shock or when this is coupled with the chelator EDTA. When used in combination with EDTA, nisin can inhibit E. coli O157:H7 and Salmonella enterica. Nisin, as a class I bacteriocin, is very stable at acidic pHs and is more heat stable at lower pHs. The mode of action of Nisin against pathogens such as Listeria monocytogenes is to dissipate the membrane potential and pH gradient.

Nisin is soluble in water and effective at levels nearing the parts-per-billion range. Nisin concentration can be measured using various techniques such as chromatography or by a simple agar diffusion bioassay.

== Applications ==
=== Food production ===
Nisin is used in processed cheese, meats, beverages, etc. during production to extend shelf life by suppressing Gram-positive spoilage and pathogenic bacteria. In foods, it is common to use nisin at levels ranging from ~1-25 ppm, depending on the food type and regulatory approval. As a food additive, nisin has an E number of E234. Growing consumer demand for natural preservatives has increased interest in nisin as a clean-label solution.

=== Other ===
Due to its naturally selective spectrum of activity, it is also employed as a selective agent in microbiological media to isolate gram-negative bacteria, yeast, and moulds.

Nisin has also been used in food packaging applications and can serve as a preservative by controlled release onto the food surface from the polymer packaging.

In combination with miconazole, it has been studied as a possible treatment for infections of Clostridioides difficile.
