= Streptomyces qinglanensis =

Scientific classification
- Domain: Bacteria
- Kingdom: Bacillati
- Phylum: Actinomycetota
- Class: Actinomycetia
- Order: Streptomycetales
- Family: Streptomycetaceae
- Genus: Streptomyces
- Species: S. qinglanensis

Binomial name
- Streptomyces qinglanensis Hu et al. 2012

Type strain
- 172205, CGMCC 4.6825, DSM 42035

Species of bacterium

Streptomyces qinglanensis is a bacterium species from the genus of Streptomyces which has been isolated from mangrove soil from Wenchang in the Hainan in China.

== See also ==
- List of Streptomyces species
