= Methyl 2-acetamidoacrylate =

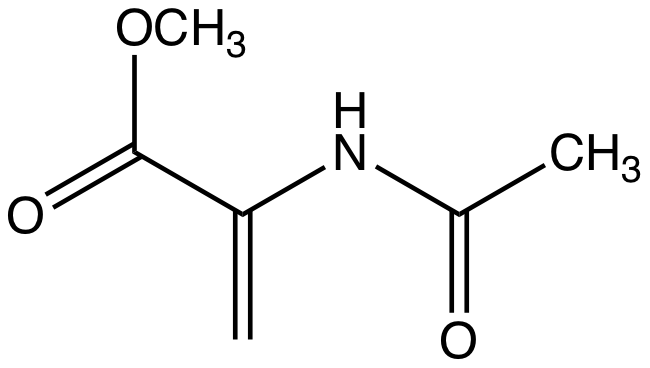

Names
- Preferred IUPAC name Methyl 2-acetamidoprop-2-enoate
- Other names Methyl 2-(acetylamino)propenoate

Identifiers
CAS Number	35356-70-8
3D model (JSmol)	Interactive image
ChemSpider	89087
ECHA InfoCard	100.107.415
EC Number	609-121-9
PubChem CID	98644
UNII	GT3ARJ50FG
CompTox Dashboard (EPA)	DTXSID70188849
- InChI: InChI=1S/C6H9NO3/c1-4(6(9)10-3)7-5(2)8/h1H2,2-3H3,(H,7,8) Key: SMWNFFKPVLVOQQ-UHFFFAOYSA-N
- SMILES: CC(=O)NC(=C)C(=O)OC

Properties
Chemical formula	C_{6}H_{9}NO_{3}
Molar mass	143.142 g·mol^{−1}
Appearance	white solid
Melting point	75–76 °C (167–169 °F; 348–349 K)

Hazards
- GHS labelling
Pictograms	(GHS07: Exclamation mark)
Signal word	Warning
Hazard statements	H315, H319, H335
Precautionary statements	P261, P264, P271, P280, P302+P352, P304+P340, P305+P351+P338, P312, P321, P332+P313, P337+P313, P362, P403+P233, P405, P501
- Except where otherwise noted, data are given for materials in their standard state (at 25 °C [77 °F], 100 kPa). Infobox references

Methyl 2-acetamidoacrylate is the organic compound with the formula CH_{2}=C(NHC(O)CH_{3})CO_{2}CH_{3}. It is the methyl ester of an N-acetylacrylic acid, which in turn is a derivative of the unstable compound dehydroalanine. Acetylation of the amine in the latter compound prevents tautomerization. It is a white solid.

The compound can be prepared from methyl 2-acetamidopropionate (CH_{3}CH(NHC(O)CH_{3})CO_{2}CH_{3}), i.e. the methyl ester of N-acetylalanine. Methyl 2-acetamidoacrylate undergoes Michael reactions, e.g. by thiolates.

== Related compounds ==
N-Acetamidoacrylic acid (registry number 5429-56-1) is the carboxylic acid parent of methyl 2-acetamidoacrylate. The free acid is a popular substrate for asymmetric hydrogenation.
