= Bacteriocinogen =

Bacteriocinogens, also known as bacteriocinogenic plasmids, are bacterial plasmids that direct the synthesis of bacteriocins, bacterocidal proteins produced by certain types of bacteria that kill other strains of the same species or closely related species. Normally, the bacteriocinogen is repressed and doesn't express bacteriocin, but under certain conditions the plasmid is derepressed in a complex and poorly understood manner.
