= Lanthionine =

Names
- IUPAC name S-[(2R)-2-Amino-2-carboxyethyl]-L-cysteine

Identifiers
CAS Number	922-55-4
3D model (JSmol)	Interactive image
ChEBI	CHEBI:21347
ChemSpider	88959
ECHA InfoCard	100.011.888
PubChem CID	256406
UNII	JO78O46X3K
CompTox Dashboard (EPA)	DTXSID40871812
- InChI: InChI=1S/C6H12N2O4S/c7-3(5(9)10)1-13-2-4(8)6(11)12/h3-4H,1-2,7-8H2,(H,9,10)(H,11,12)/t3-,4-/m0/s1 Key: DWPCPZJAHOETAG-IMJSIDKUSA-N; InChI=1/C6H12N2O4S/c7-3(5(9)10)1-13-2-4(8)6(11)12/h3-4H,1-2,7-8H2,(H,9,10)(H,11,12)/t3-,4-/m0/s1 Key: DWPCPZJAHOETAG-IMJSIDKUBX
- SMILES: O=C(O)[C@@H](N)CSC[C@H](N)C(=O)O

Properties
Chemical formula	C_{6}H_{12}N_{2}O_{4}S
Molar mass	208.2318 g/mol
Melting point	280 to 283 °C (536 to 541 °F; 553 to 556 K)
- Except where otherwise noted, data are given for materials in their standard state (at 25 °C [77 °F], 100 kPa). verify (what is ?) Infobox references

Lanthionine is a nonproteinogenic amino acid with the chemical formula (HOOC-CH(NH_{2})-CH_{2}-S-CH_{2}-CH(NH_{2})-COOH). It is typically formed by a cysteine residue and a dehydrated serine residue. Despite its name, lanthionine does not contain the element lanthanum.

== Background ==
In 1941, lanthionine was first isolated by treating wool with sodium carbonate. It was found to be a sulfur-containing amino acid; accordingly it was given the name lanthionine [wool (Latin: Lana), sulfur (Greek: theîon)]. Lanthionine was first synthesized by alkylation of cysteine with β-chloroalanine. Lanthionines are found widely in nature. They have been isolated from human hair, lactalbumin, and feathers. Lanthionines have also been found in bacterial cell walls and are the components of a group of gene-encoded peptide antibiotics called lantibiotics, which includes nisin (a food preservative), subtilin, epidermin (effective against Staphylococcus and Streptococcus), and ancovenin (an enzyme inhibitor). Lanthionine is listed among novel uremic toxins, compounds elevated in blood of chronic kidney failure and uremic patiens. It likely contributes to hyperhomocysteinemia and impaired hydrogen sulfide biosynthesis. Lanthionine retention may also be linked to adverse cardiovascular outcomes as it can induce heart tissue fibrosis and promote vascular calcification.

== Preparation ==
A variety of syntheses of lanthionine have been published including sulfur extrusion from cystine, ring opening of serine β-lactone, and hetero-conjugate addition of cysteine to dehydroalanine. The sulfur extrusion method is, however, the only pathway for lanthionine that has been employed in the total synthesis of a lantibiotic.

Biosynthesis of the lanthionine bridge in peptidic natural products can be accomplished through a number of different pathways. For example, the lanthionine bridges in the antibiotic nisin are the result of a dedicated dehydratase (NisB) and a dedicated cyclase (NisC).
