= SAM–SAH riboswitch =

Bacterial RNA structure

SAM/SAH riboswitch
- Consensus secondary structure of SAM–SAH riboswitches

Identifiers
- Symbol: SAM/SAH riboswitch
- Rfam: RF01727

Other data
- RNA type: Riboswitch
- Domain(s): Rhodobacterales
- PDB structures: PDBe

The SAM–SAH riboswitch is a conserved RNA structure in certain bacteria that binds S-adenosylmethionine (SAM) and S-adenosylhomocysteine (SAH) and is therefore presumed to be a riboswitch. SAM–SAH riboswitches do not share any apparent structural resemblance to known riboswitches that bind SAM or SAH. The binding affinities for both compounds are similar, but binding for SAH is at least somewhat stronger. SAM–SAH riboswitches are exclusively found in Rhodobacterales, an order of alphaproteobacteria. They are always found in the apparent 5' untranslated regions of metK genes, which encode the enzyme (Methionine adenosyltransferase) that synthesizes SAM.

Given this gene association, it was proposed that SAM–SAH riboswitches more likely function as SAM-sensing RNAs. SAM–SAH riboswitches are relatively small among known riboswitches, which might relate to their inability to discriminate against SAH. However, the ability to reject SAH as a ligand might not be important under physiological conditions, because the cellular concentration of SAM is higher.

A region of the conserved structure of SAM–SAH riboswitches includes a predicted Shine-Dalgarno sequence (ribosome-binding site) of the downstream metK genes. These nucleotides are required for optimal binding to the ligand and might form a pseudoknot with the terminal loop within the main stem-loop structure. Occlusion of the Shine-Dalgarno sequence might be the mechanism by which SAM–SAH riboswitches regulate expression of the downstream genes.

The 3-D structure of a SAM-SAH riboswitch has been determined by two groups working independently.

== See also ==
- SAM-I riboswitch
- SAM-II riboswitch
- SAM-III riboswitch
- SAM-IV riboswitch
- SAM-V riboswitch
- SAM-VI riboswitch
