= AG-270 =

Identifiers
- IUPAC name: 3-(cyclohexen-1-yl)-6-(4-methoxyphenyl)-2-phenyl-5-(pyridin-2-ylamino)-1H-pyrazolo[1,5-a]pyrimidin-7-one
- CAS Number: 2201056-66-6
- PubChem CID: 134307820
- ChemSpider: 128948728
- UNII: E1P2TDU69L
- ChEMBL: ChEMBL4573938

Chemical and physical data
- Formula: C_{30}H_{27}N_{5}O_{2}
- Molar mass: 489.579 g·mol^{−1}
- 3D model (JSmol): Interactive image
- SMILES: COC1=CC=C(C(C2=O)=C(N=C3C(C4=CCCCC4)=C(NN32)C5=CC=CC=C5)NC6=CC=CC=N6)C=C1
- InChI: InChI=1S/C30H27N5O2/c1-37-23-17-15-21(16-18-23)26-28(32-24-14-8-9-19-31-24)33-29-25(20-10-4-2-5-11-20)27(34-35(29)30(26)36)22-12-6-3-7-13-22/h3,6-10,12-19,34H,2,4-5,11H2,1H3,(H,31,32); Key:LSOYYWKBUKXUHQ-UHFFFAOYSA-N

AG-270 is an experimental drug which acts as an inhibitor of the methionine adenosyltransferase 2α (MAT2A) enzyme, which is important for the development of some types of cancer. AG-270 has reached early stage human clinical trials.
