= Riboswitch s0670 =

riboswitch_s0670
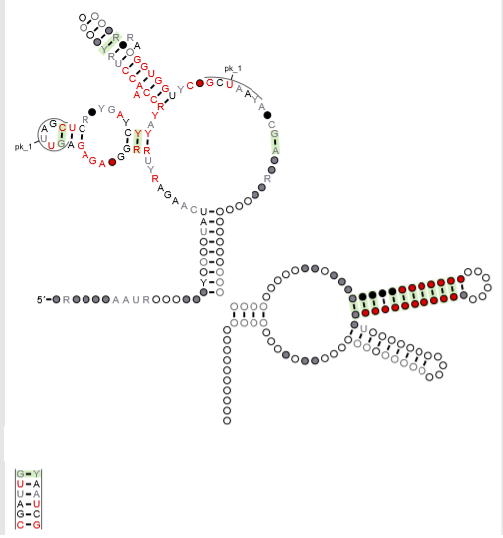
- Predicted secondary structure and sequence conservation of riboswitch_s0670

Identifiers
- Symbol: riboswitch_s0670
- Rfam: XXXX

Other data
- RNA type: Cis-reg; Riboswitch;
- Domain: Bacteria
- PDB structures: PDBe

Riboswitch_s0670 is a probable SAM riboswitch identified by RNA deep sequencing of Clostridioides difficile 630. Close matches are found with members of the SAM-I-IV-variant family, however s0670 and several sequences in this alignment do not match any Rfam family. Downstream genes are either S-adenosylmethionine synthetase (most frequently), S-ribosylhomocysteine lyase, O-acetylhomoserine (thiol)-lyase O-acetylhomoserine sulfhydrylase, homoserine dehydrogenase.
