= Streptomyces-metKH RNA motif =

Streptomyces-metH
- Consensus secondary structure and sequence conservation of Streptomyces-metH RNA

Identifiers
- Symbol: Streptomyces-metH
- Rfam: RF03076

Other data
- RNA type: Gene; sRNA
- SO: SO:0001263
- PDB structures: PDBe

A Streptomyces-metKH RNA motif is a conserved RNA structure that was discovered by bioinformatics. Such motifs are found in the genus Streptomyces, and are present upstream of either metK genes, which encode the S-adenosylmethionine synthetase enzyme or metH genes, which encodes the adenosylcobalamin-dependent form of methionine synthase. The RNA structures upstream of metK and metH genes are distinct from each other, but exhibit overall similar sequence and secondary structure features, suggesting that they are related to one another. Their presence upstream of protein-coding genes, and the fact that the genes perform related steps in metabolism, suggests that the RNAs function as cis-regulatory elements.
