= FAM86B1 =

Protein found in most eukaryotes

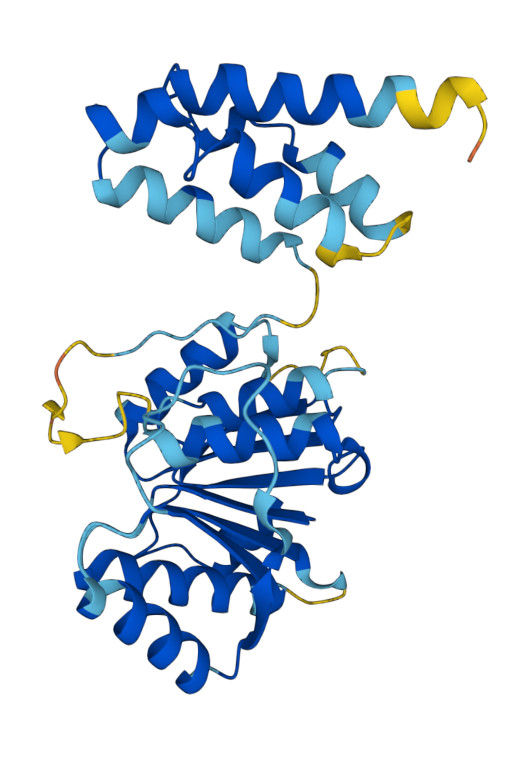

Identifiers
- Aliases: FAM86B1, family with sequence similarity 86 member B1
- External IDs: OMIM: 616122; MGI: 1917761; GeneCards: FAM86B1

Gene location (Human)
Chr.	Chromosome 8 (human)
Band	8p23.1	Start	12,182,096 bp
Band	8p23.1	End	12,194,133 bp

Gene location (Mouse)
Chr.	Chromosome 16 (mouse)
Band	16 A1|16 2.51 cM	Start	5,062,016 bp
Band	16 A1|16 2.51 cM	End	5,073,847 bp
RNA expression pattern
Bgee	Human / Mouse (ortholog); Top expressed in: right uterine tube; pituitary gland; anterior pituitary; nucleus accumbens; right hemisphere of cerebellum; caudate nucleus; right frontal lobe; hypothalamus; putamen; left ovary / Top expressed in: interventricular septum; right kidney; spermatocyte; blastocyst; morula; neural layer of retina; proximal tubule; yolk sac; lip; muscle of thigh; More reference expression data
BioGPS	n/a
Orthologs
Databases	NCBI: entry; OMA: entry
Species	Human	Mouse
Entrez	85002	70511
Ensembl	ENSG00000186523	ENSMUSG00000022544
UniProt	Q8N7N1	Q3UZW7
RefSeq (mRNA)	NM_001083537	NM_027446
RefSeq (protein)	NP_001077006	NP_081722
Location (UCSC)	Chr 8: 12.18 – 12.19 Mb	Chr 16: 5.06 – 5.07 Mb
PubMed search
- Wikidata
View/Edit Human	View/Edit Mouse

FAM86B1 protein structure from AlphaFold. Colored red for alpha helices, yellow for beta sheet, green for peroxisomal targeting signal, and blue for other coils. Created using NCBI iCn3D protein visualizer.

FAM86B1 is a protein, which in humans is encoded by the FAM86B1 gene. FAM86B1 is an essential gene in humans. The protein contains two domains: FAM86, and AdoMet-MTase.

FAM86B1 homologs are found in most eukaryotes, from mammals to plants such as wild soybean.

== Gene ==
FAM86B1 in the human genome is located at 8p23.1, spanning about 12,000 base pairs. FAM86B1 contains 9 exons.

8p23.1 is the location of one of the largest and most common genetic inversions in humans. FAM86B1 is upregulated in inv-8p23.1. In the non-inverted allele 8p23.1, FAM86B1 is on the negative strand. In the allele inv-8p23.1, FAM86B1 is on the positive strand.

== Production ==
In humans, there are 20 alternative splicings of FAM86B1, and 19 mRNA transcripts. In humans, FAM86B1 is expressed ubiquitously, and most strongly in brain tissues and the pituitary gland.

== Protein ==
The human FAM86B1 protein contains two domains, FAM86 and AdoMet-MTase, making FAM86B1 a member of these two protein families. The human FAM86B1 gene encodes 13 protein isoforms. FAM86B1 is a non-classically secreted protein, targeted to the peroxisome by a C-terminus signal.

FAM86B1 interacts with ubiquitin-C and FAM86C1.

== Evolution ==
FAM86B1 homologs are seen in most eukaryotes, but are not found in distant plants, such as green algae. Wild soybean is the most distant species from humans with a FAM86B1 homolog.

FAM86B1 in humans is paralogous with other FAM86 protein-coding genes.

Human FAM86 protein-coding genes
Gene symbol	Gene location	NCBI gene ID
EEF2KMT	16p13.3	196483
FAM86B1	8p23.1	85002
FAM86B2	8p23.1	653333
FAM86B3	8p23.1	286042
LOC128966622	8p23.1	128966622
FAM86C1	11q13.4	55199
FAM86C2	11q13.2	645332

== Clinical significance ==
=== Cancer ===
Alternative splicings of FAM86B1 are associated with decreased relapse in rectal cancer and surviving longer in glioblastoma. In bladder urothelial carcinoma, a differing FAM86B1 expression pattern compared to noncancer controls is associated with surviving longer. In glioma, lower survival rates are associated with downregulation of FAM86B1. Loss of FAM86B1 expression is associated with uterine carcinosarcoma, prostate adenocarcinoma, and bladder urothelial carcinoma.

=== Infection ===
Severe respiratory syncytial virus bronchiolitis is associated with downregulation of FAM86B1. Enterovirus-71, a positive-sense single-stranded RNA virus, binds to FAM86B1. FAM86B1 is upregulated after exposure to the infection agent of Candida albicans.

=== Inflammation ===
FAM86B1 is upregulated after exposure to oS100A4, a potential trigger of inflammation in rheumatoid arthritis. FAM86B1 is downregulated after remote ischemic preconditioning, which inhibits inflammation regulation.
