= SMK box riboswitch =

S_{MK} box translational riboswitch
- A representation of the S_{MK} box translational riboswitch secondary structure including a colour scheme that indicates the degree of sequence conservation.

Identifiers
- Symbol: SMK_box_riboswitch
- Alt. Symbols: SAM-III, SMK
- Rfam: RF01767

Other data
- RNA type: Riboswitch
- Domain(s): Bacillota
- PDB structures: PDBe 3e5f 3e5e 3e5c

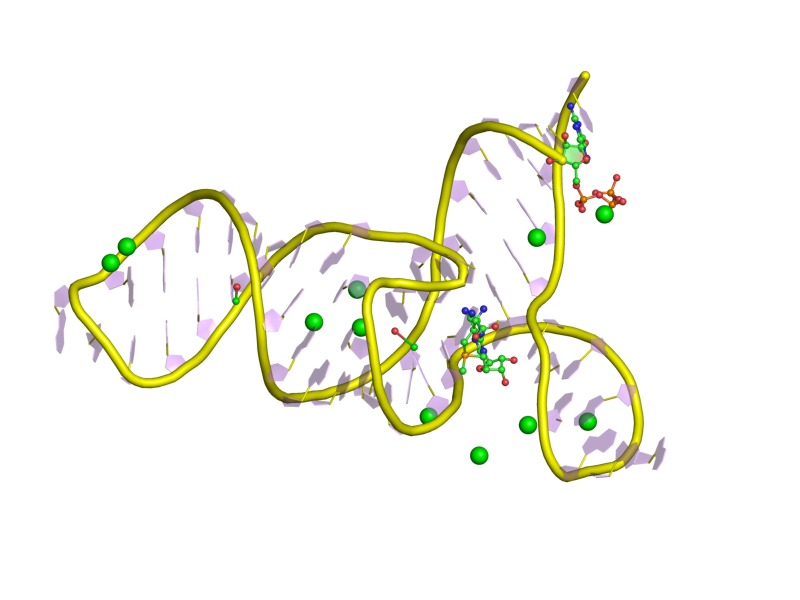
A 3D representation of the S_{MK}box riboswitch structure.

The S_{MK}box riboswitch (also known as SAM-III) is an RNA element that regulates gene expression in bacteria. The S_{MK} box riboswitch is found in the 5' UTR of the MetK gene in lactic acid bacteria. The structure of this element changes upon binding to S-adenosyl methionine (SAM) to a conformation that blocks the shine-dalgarno sequence and blocks translation of the gene.

There are other known SAM-binding riboswitches such as SAM-I and SAM-II, but these appear to share no similarity in sequence or structure to SAM-III.

== Structure ==
The crystal structure of the riboswitch from E. faecalis was solved by X-ray crystallography. The structure showed that the most conserved nucleotides involved in SAM binding were organised around a junction between three helices. In some species there are large insertions of up to 210 nucleotides within this structure.

== See also ==
- SAH riboswitch
- SAM-I riboswitch
- SAM-II riboswitch
- SAM-IV riboswitch
- SAM-V riboswitch
- SAM-VI riboswitch
- SAM-Chlorobi RNA motif
- SAM–SAH riboswitch
