= AdoMet MTase =

Protein domain and superfamily

SAM-dependent MTases superfamily
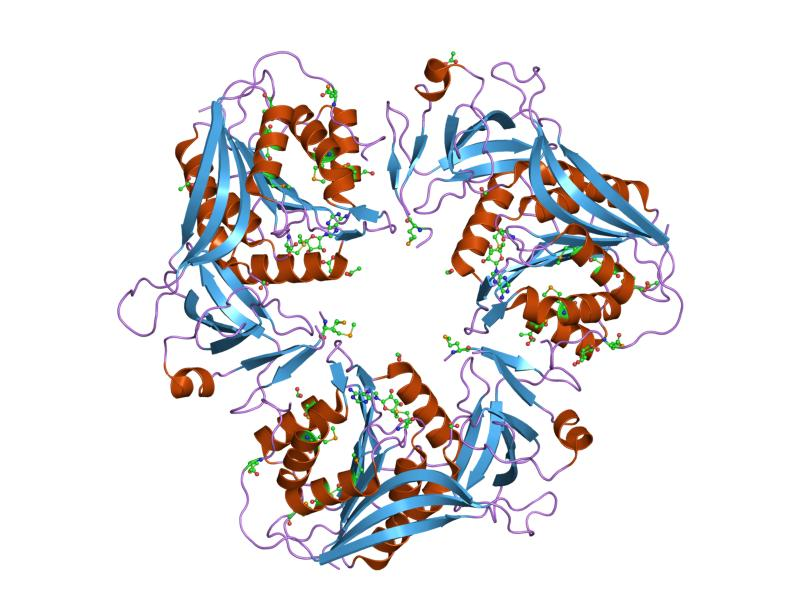
- Cartoon representation of the molecular structure of the Crystal Structure of the SAM Dependent Methyltransferase from Agrobacterium tumefaciens (PDB: 2igt)

Identifiers
- Symbol: SAM-dependent_MTases
- ECOD: 2003.1.5
- InterPro: IPR029063
Available protein structures:
- PDB: IPR029063
- AlphaFold: IPR029063

AdoMet_MTase

Identifiers
- Symbol: AdoMet_MTase
- Pfam: PF07757
- Pfam clan: CL0063
- InterPro: IPR011671
Available protein structures:
- PDB: IPR011671 PF07757 (ECOD; PDBsum)
- AlphaFold: IPR011671; PF07757

S-adenosylmethionine-dependent methyltransferase (SAM-MTase or AdoMet-MTase) is a conserved protein domain and protein superfamily. SAM-MTase proteins are methyltransferases. There are five protein families within SAM-MTase,

SAM-MTases use S-adenosyl-L-methionine as a substrate for methylation, creating the product S-adenosyl-L-homocysteine.

== Structure and subgroups ==
All SAM-MTases contain a structurally conserved SAM-binding domain consisting of a central seven-stranded beta-sheet that is flanked by three alpha-helices per side of the sheet.

A review published in 2003 divides all methyltransferases into 5 main classes based on the structure of their catalytic domain (fold):

- class I: Rossmann-like α/β, the largest subgroup.
- class II: TIM β/α-barrel α/β
- class III: tetrapyrrole methylase α/β
- class IV: SPOUT α/β
- class V: SET domain all β
