= SAM-II riboswitch =

SAM riboswitch (alpha-proteobacteria)
- Predicted secondary structure and sequence conservation of SAM_alpha

Identifiers
- Symbol: SAM_alpha
- Rfam: RF00521

Other data
- RNA type: Cis-reg; riboswitch
- Domain(s): Bacteria
- GO: GO:0045814
- SO: SO:0000035
- PDB structures: PDBe

The SAM-II riboswitch is an RNA element found predominantly in Alphaproteobacteria that binds S-adenosyl methionine (SAM). Its structure and sequence appear to be unrelated to the SAM riboswitch found in Gram-positive bacteria. This SAM riboswitch is located upstream of the metA and metC genes in Agrobacterium tumefaciens, and other methionine and SAM biosynthesis genes in other alpha-proteobacteria. Like the other SAM riboswitch, it probably functions to turn off expression of these genes in response to elevated SAM levels. A significant variant of SAM-II riboswitches was found in Pelagibacter ubique and related marine bacteria and called SAM-V. Also, like many structured RNAs, SAM-II riboswitches can tolerate long loops between their stems.

== Structure ==
The SAM-II riboswitch is short with less than 70 nucleotides and is structurally relatively simple being composed of a single hairpin and a pseudoknot.

== See also ==
- SAM-I riboswitch
- SAM-III riboswitch
- SAM-IV riboswitch
- SAM-V riboswitch
- SAM-VI riboswitch
