= SAM-IV riboswitch =

S-adenosyl methionine (SAM) riboswitch,
- Predicted secondary structure and sequence conservation of SAM-IV

Identifiers
- Symbol: SAM-IV
- Rfam: RF00634 CL00012

Other data
- RNA type: Cis-reg; riboswitch
- Domain: Bacteria
- SO: SO:0005836
- PDB structures: PDBe

SAM-IV riboswitches are a kind of riboswitch that specifically binds S-adenosylmethionine (SAM), a cofactor used in many methylation reactions. Originally identified by bioinformatics, SAM-IV riboswitches are largely confined to the Actinomycetales, an order of Bacteria. Conserved features of SAM-IV riboswitch and experiments imply that they probably share a similar SAM-binding site to another class of SAM-binding riboswitches called SAM-I riboswitches. However, the scaffolds of these two types of riboswitch appear to be quite distinct. The structural relationship between these riboswitch types has been studied.

== See also ==
- SAM-I riboswitch
- SAM-II riboswitch
- SAM-III riboswitch
- SAM-V riboswitch
- SAM-VI riboswitch
