= SAM-VI riboswitch =

SAM-VI is a member of the riboswitch family. It is predominantly found in Bifidobacterium and exhibits some similarities to the SAM-III (Smk box) riboswitch class, but lacks most of the highly conserved nucleotides of SAM-III class. SAM-VI aptamers bind the cofactor S-adenosylmethinine SAM (a key metabolite in sulphur metabolism) and discriminate strongly against S-adenosylhomocysteine SAH. The class was discovered by further analysis of Bifido-meK motif RNAs.

== See also ==
- SAM-I riboswitch
- SAM-II riboswitch
- SAM-III riboswitch
- SAM-IV riboswitch
- SAM-V riboswitch
