= SAM-V riboswitch =

SAM-V
- Conserved secondary structure of the SAM-V riboswitch.

Identifiers
- Symbol: SAM-V
- Rfam: RF01826

Other data
- RNA type: Cis-reg; Riboswitch;
- Domain(s): Marine metagenome
- PDB structures: PDBe

SAM-V riboswitch is the fifth known riboswitch to bind S-adenosyl methionine (SAM). It was first discovered in the marine bacterium Candidatus Pelagibacter ubique and can also be found in marine metagenomes. SAM-V features a similar consensus sequence and secondary structure as the binding site of SAM-II riboswitch, but bioinformatics scans cluster the two aptamers independently. These similar binding pockets suggest that the two riboswitches have undergone convergent evolution.

SAM-binding was confirmed using equilibrium dialysis. The riboswitch has been characterised as a 'tandem riboswitch' - it is able to regulate both translation and transcription. When SAM is present in high concentration, SAM-II will bind its ligand and form a terminator stem to halt transcription. If SAM exists in lower concentrations, SAM-V will be transcribed and, if SAM concentration should then increase, it can bind SAM and occlude the Shine-Dalgarno sequence of the downstream open reading frame. This regulation controls parts of the sulfur metabolism of marine bacteria.

The crystal structure of the riboswitch has been solved (PDB 6FZ0). It contains a pseudoknot.

== See also ==
- SAM-I riboswitch
- SAM-II riboswitch
- SAM-III riboswitch
- SAM-IV riboswitch
- SAM-VI riboswitch
