= S-Adenosyl methionine =

Chemical compound found in all domains of life with largely unexplored effects

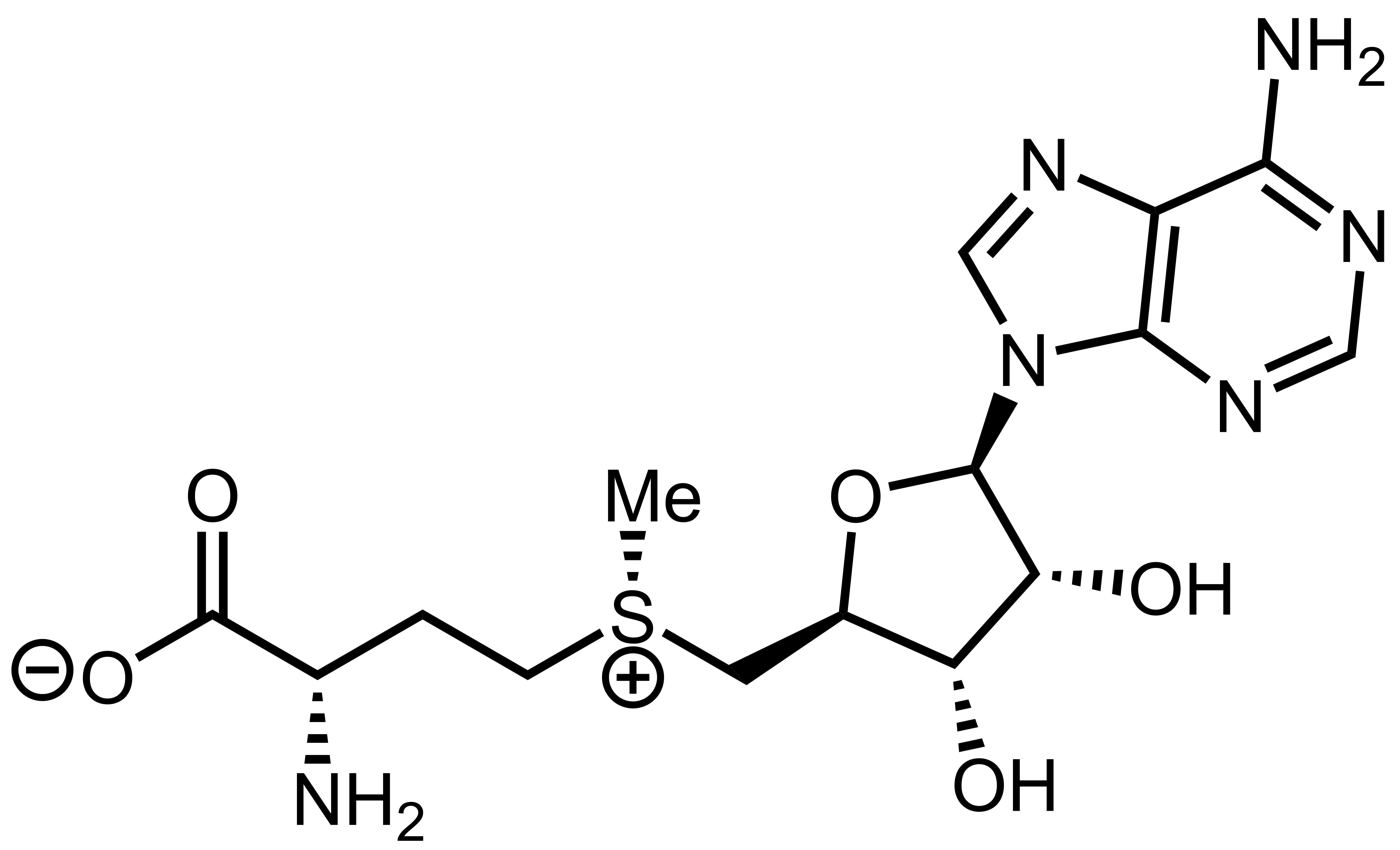

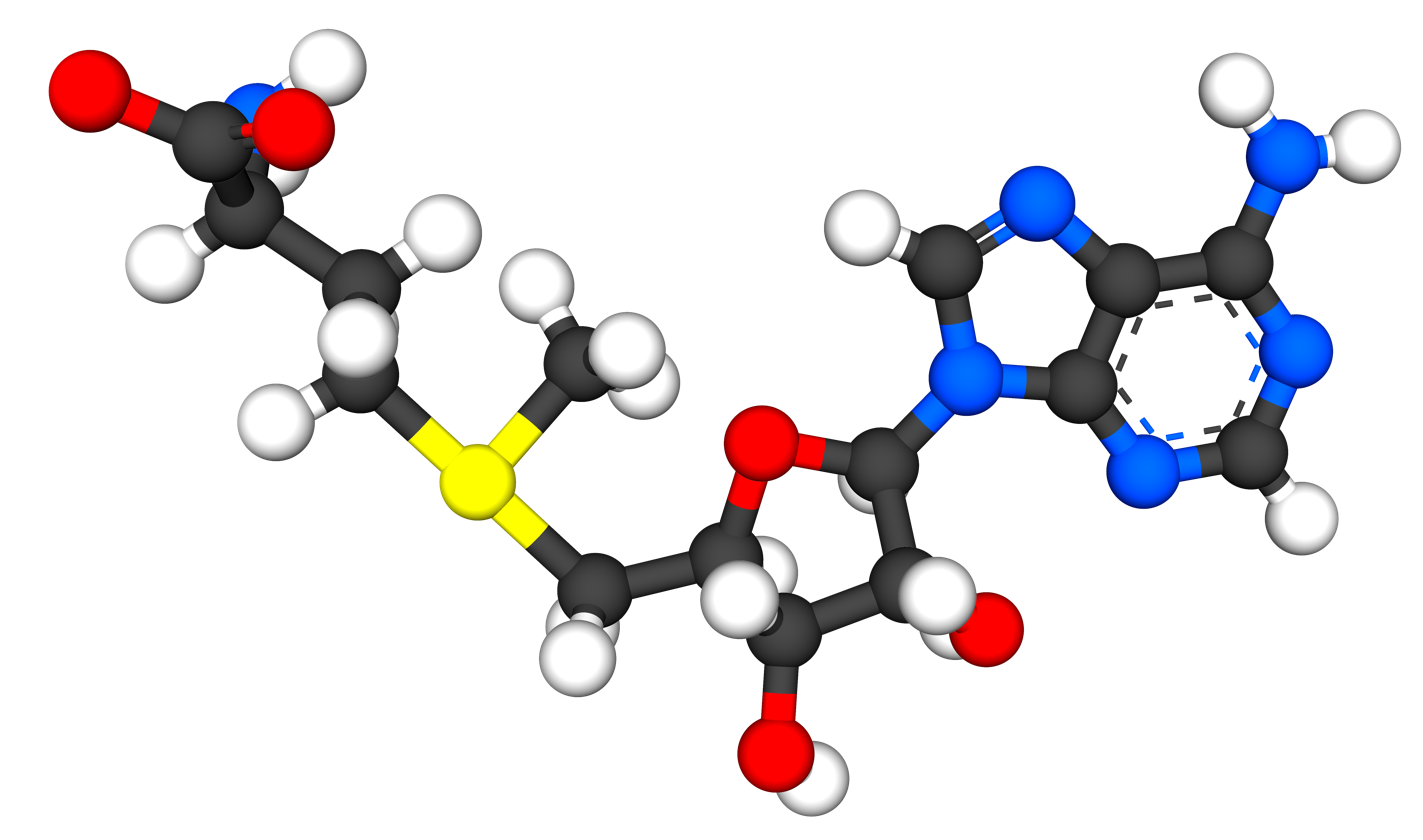

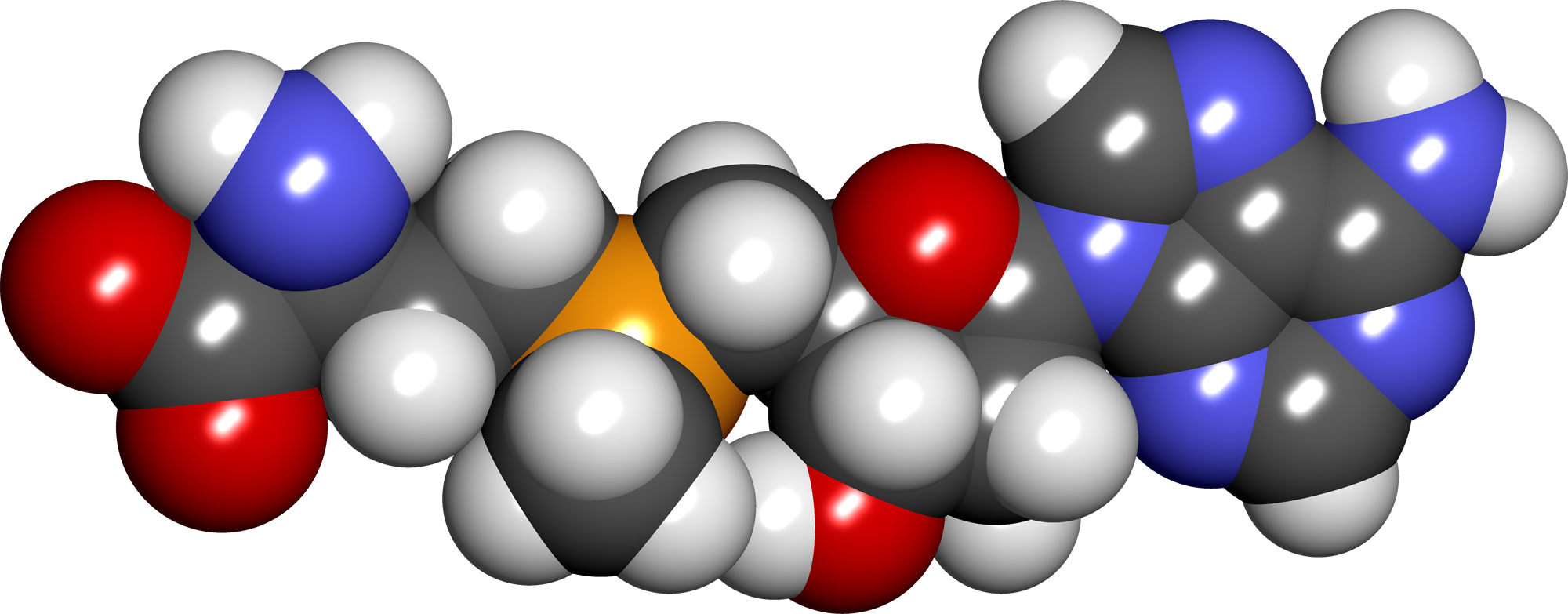

Names
- Systematic IUPAC name (2S)-2-Amino-4-[(S)-{[(2S,3S,4R,5R)-5-(4-amino-9H-purin-9-yl)-3,4-dihydroxyoxolan-2-yl]methyl}methylsulfaniumyl]butanoate
- Other names S-Adenosyl-L-methionine; SAM-e; SAMe, AdoMet, Heparab (India), ademethionine

Identifiers
CAS Number	29908-03-0
3D model (JSmol)	Interactive image
ChEMBL	ChEMBL1088977
ChemSpider	8041295
ECHA InfoCard	100.045.391
KEGG	C00019
MeSH	S-Adenosylmethionine
PubChem CID	9865604
UNII	7LP2MPO46S
CompTox Dashboard (EPA)	DTXSID6032019
- InChI: InChI=1S/C15H22N6O5S/c1-27(3-2-7(16)15(24)25)4-8-10(22)11(23)14(26-8)21-6-20-9-12(17)18-5-19-13(9)21/h5-8,10-11,14,22-23H,2-4,16H2,1H3,(H2-,17,18,19,24,25)/p+1/t7?,8-,10-,11-,14-,27?/m1/s1 Key: MEFKEPWMEQBLKI-YDBXVIPQSA-O; InChI=1/C15H22N6O5S/c1-27(3-2-7(16)15(24)25)4-8-10(22)11(23)14(26-8)21-6-20-9-12(17)18-5-19-13(9)21/h5-8,10-11,14,22-23H,2-4,16H2,1H3,(H2-,17,18,19,24,25)/p+1/t7?,8-,10-,11-,14-,27?/m1/s1 Key: MEFKEPWMEQBLKI-NNGIMXIKBF
- SMILES: O=C(O)C(N)CC[S+](C)C[C@H]3O[C@@H](n2cnc1c(ncnc12)N)[C@H](O)[C@@H]3O

Properties
Chemical formula	C_{15}H_{22}N_{6}O_{5}S
Molar mass	398.44 g·mol^{−1}

Pharmacology
ATC code	A16AA02 (WHO)
- Except where otherwise noted, data are given for materials in their standard state (at 25 °C [77 °F], 100 kPa). verify (what is ?) Infobox references

S-Adenosyl methionine (SAM), also known under the commercial names of SAMe, SAM-e, or Adonat, is a common cosubstrate involved in methyl group transfers, transsulfuration, and aminopropylation. Although these anabolic reactions occur throughout the body, most SAM is produced and consumed in the liver. More than 40 methyl transfers from SAM are known, to various substrates such as nucleic acids, proteins, lipids and secondary metabolites. It is made from adenosine triphosphate (ATP) and methionine by methionine adenosyltransferase. SAM was first discovered by Giulio Cantoni in 1952.

In bacteria, SAM is bound by the SAM riboswitch, which regulates genes involved in methionine or cysteine biosynthesis. In eukaryotic cells, SAM serves as a regulator of a variety of processes including DNA, tRNA, and rRNA methylation; immune response; amino acid metabolism; transsulfuration; and more. In plants, SAM is crucial to the biosynthesis of ethylene, an important plant hormone and signaling molecule.

SAM has been studied for depression, osteoarthritis, and liver diseases with inconclusive results, and while generally considered safe short-term, its long-term safety, use during pregnancy, and risks for people with bipolar disorder or compromised immune systems remain unclear.

== Structure ==
S-Adenosyl methionine consists of the adenosyl group attached to the sulfur of methionine, providing it with a positive charge. It is synthesized from ATP and methionine by S-adenosylmethionine synthetase enzyme through the following reaction:

ATP + L-methionine + H2O $\rightleftharpoons$ phosphate + diphosphate + S-adenosyl-L-methionine

The sulfonium functional group present in S-adenosyl methionine is the center of its peculiar reactivity. Depending on the enzyme, S-adenosyl methionine can be converted into one of three products:

- adenosyl radical, which converts to deoxyadenosine (AdO): classic rSAM reaction, also cogenerates methionine
- S-adenosyl homocysteine, releasing methyl radical
- methylthioadenosine (SMT), homoalanine radical

== Biochemistry ==
=== SAM cycle ===
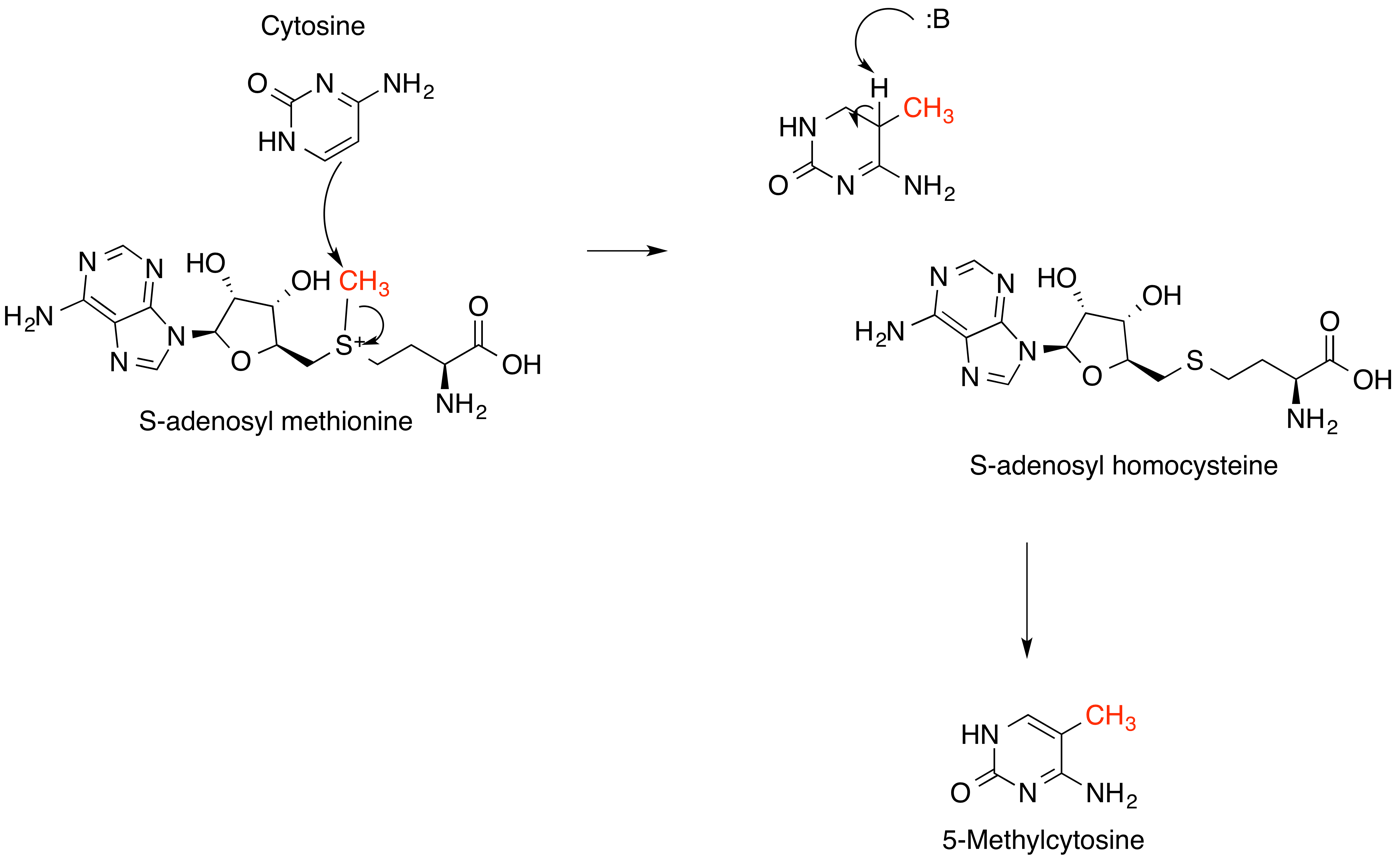
The S_{N}2-like methyl transfer reaction. Only the SAM cofactor and cytosine base are shown for simplicity.

The reactions that produce, consume, and regenerate SAM are called the SAM cycle. In the first step of this cycle, the SAM-dependent methylases (EC 2.1.1) that use SAM as a substrate produce S-adenosyl homocysteine as a product. S-Adenosyl homocysteine is a strong negative regulator of nearly all SAM-dependent methylases despite their biological diversity. The S-adenosyl homocysteine is hydrolysed to homocysteine and adenosine by S-adenosylhomocysteine hydrolase and the homocysteine recycled back to methionine through transfer of a methyl group from 5-methyltetrahydrofolate, by one of the two classes of methionine synthases (i.e. cobalamin-dependent or cobalamin-independent). This methionine can then be converted back to SAM, completing the cycle. In the rate-limiting step of the SAM cycle, MTHFR (methylenetetrahydrofolate reductase) irreversibly reduces 5,10-methylenetetrahydrofolate to 5-methyltetrahydrofolate.

=== Radical SAM enzymes ===
A large number of enzymes cleave SAM reductively to produce radicals: 5′-deoxyadenosyl 5′-radical, methyl radical, and others. These enzymes are called radical SAMs. They all feature iron-sulfur cluster at their active sites. Most enzymes with this capability share a region of sequence homology that includes the motif CxxxCxxC or a close variant. This sequence provides three cysteinyl thiolate ligands that bind to three of the four metals in the 4Fe-4S cluster. The fourth Fe binds the SAM.

The radical intermediates generated by these enzymes perform a wide variety of unusual chemical reactions. Examples of radical SAM enzymes include spore photoproduct lyase, activates of pyruvate formate lyase and anaerobic sulfatases, lysine 2,3-aminomutase, and various enzymes of cofactor biosynthesis, peptide modification, metalloprotein cluster formation, tRNA modification, lipid metabolism, etc. Some radical SAM enzymes use a second SAM as a methyl donor. Radical SAM enzymes are much more abundant in anaerobic bacteria than in aerobic organisms. They can be found in all domains of life and are largely unexplored. A recent bioinformatics study concluded that this family of enzymes includes at least 114,000 sequences including 65 unique reactions.

Deficiencies in radical SAM enzymes have been associated with a variety of diseases including congenital heart disease, amyotrophic lateral sclerosis, and increased viral susceptibility.

=== Polyamine biosynthesis ===
Another major role of SAM is in polyamine biosynthesis. Here, SAM is decarboxylated by adenosylmethionine decarboxylase to form S-adenosylmethioninamine. S-Adenosylmethioninamine then donates its n-propylamine group in the biosynthesis of polyamines such as spermidine and spermine from putrescine.

SAM is required for cellular growth and repair. It is also involved in the biosynthesis of several hormones and neurotransmitters that affect mood, such as epinephrine. Methyltransferases are also responsible for the addition of methyl groups to the 2′ hydroxyls of the first and second nucleotides next to the 5′ cap in messenger RNA.

== Therapeutic uses ==
SAMe has been studied for depression, osteoarthritis, and liver diseases with inconclusive results, and while generally considered safe short-term, its long-term safety, use during pregnancy, and risks for people with bipolar disorder or compromised immune systems remain unclear.

=== Osteoarthrtitis pain ===
As of 2012, the evidence was inconclusive as to whether SAM can mitigate the pain of osteoarthritis; clinical trials that had been conducted were too small from which to generalize.

=== Liver disease ===
The SAM cycle has been closely tied to the liver since 1947 because people with alcoholic cirrhosis of the liver would accumulate large amounts of methionine in their blood. While multiple lines of evidence from laboratory tests on cells and animal models suggest that SAM might be useful to treat various liver diseases, as of 2012 SAM had not been studied in any large randomized placebo-controlled clinical trials that would allow an assessment of its efficacy and safety.

=== Depression ===
A 2016 Cochrane review concluded that for major depressive disorder, "Given the absence of high quality evidence and the inability to draw firm conclusions based on that evidence, the use of SAMe for the treatment of depression in adults should be investigated further.".

A 2020 systematic review found that it performed significantly better than placebo, and had similar outcomes to other commonly used antidepressants (imipramine and escitalopram).

=== Anti-cancer treatment ===
SAM has recently been shown to play a role in epigenetic regulation. DNA methylation is a key regulator in epigenetic modification during mammalian cell development and differentiation. In mouse models, excess levels of SAM have been implicated in erroneous methylation patterns associated with diabetic neuropathy. SAM serves as the methyl donor in cytosine methylation, which is a key epigenetic regulatory process. Because of this impact on epigenetic regulation, SAM has been tested as an anti-cancer treatment. In many cancers, proliferation is dependent on having low levels of DNA methylation. In vitro addition in such cancers has been shown to remethylate oncogene promoter sequences and decrease the production of proto-oncogenes. In cancers such as colorectal cancer, aberrant global hypermethylation can inhibit promoter regions of tumor-suppressing genes. Contrary to the former information, colorectal cancers (CRCs) are characterized by global hypomethylation and promoter-specific DNA methylation.

== Pharmacokinetics ==
Oral SAM achieves peak plasma concentrations three to five hours after ingestion of an enteric-coated tablet (400–1000 mg). The half-life is about 100 minutes.

== Availability in different countries ==
In Canada, the UK, and the United States, SAM is sold as a dietary supplement under the marketing name SAM-e (also spelled SAME or SAMe). It was introduced in the US in 1999, after the Dietary Supplement Health and Education Act was passed in 1994.

It was introduced as a prescription drug in Italy in 1979, in Spain in 1985, and in Germany in 1989. As of 2012, it was sold as a prescription drug in Russia, India, China, Italy, Germany, Vietnam, and Mexico.

== Adverse effects ==
Gastrointestinal disorder, dyspepsia and anxiety can occur with SAM consumption. Long-term effects are unknown. SAM is a weak DNA-alkylating agent.

Another reported side effect of SAM is insomnia; therefore, the supplement is often taken in the morning. Other reports of mild side effects include lack of appetite, constipation, nausea, dry mouth, sweating, and anxiety/nervousness, but in placebo-controlled studies, these side effects occur at about the same incidence in the placebo groups.

=== Interactions and contraindications ===
Taking SAM at the same time as some drugs may increase the risk of serotonin syndrome, a potentially dangerous condition caused by having too much serotonin. These drugs include, but are certainly not limited to, dextromethorphan (Robitussin), meperidine (Demerol), pentazocine (Talwin), and tramadol (Ultram).

SAM can also interact with many antidepressant medications — including tryptophan and the herbal medicine Hypericum perforatum (St. John's wort) — increasing the potential for serotonin syndrome or other side effects, and may reduce the effectiveness of levodopa for Parkinson's disease. SAM can increase the risk of manic episodes in people who have bipolar disorder.

=== Toxicity ===
A 2022 study concluded that SAMe could be toxic. Jean-Michel Fustin of Manchester University said that the researchers found that excess SAMe breaks down into adenine and methylthioadenosine in the body, both producing the paradoxical effect of inhibiting methylation. This was found in laboratory mice, causing harm to health, and in in vitro tests on human cells.

== See also ==
- DNA methyltransferase
- SAM-I riboswitch
- SAM-II riboswitch
- SAM-III riboswitch
- SAM-IV riboswitch
- SAM-V riboswitch
- SAM-VI riboswitch
- List of investigational antidepressants
