= Adenosylhomocysteinase =

Protein-coding gene in the species Homo sapiens

S-Adenosylhomocysteine hydrolase
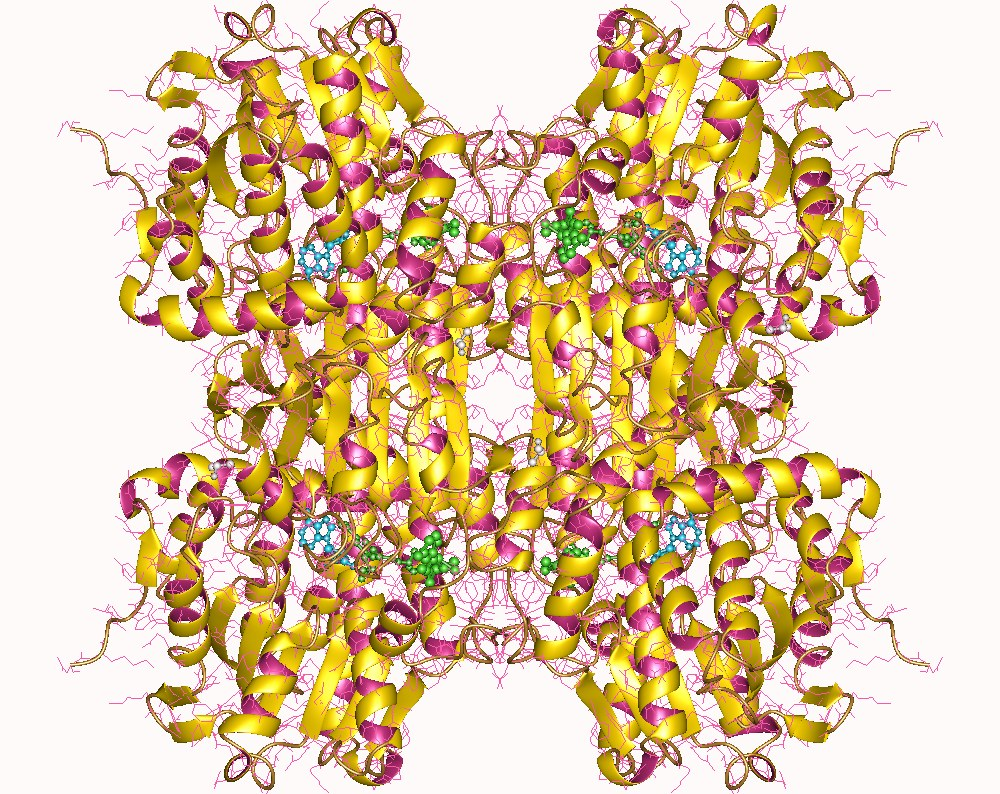
- SAH hydrolase tetramer, Human

Identifiers
- Symbol: AHCY
- NCBI gene: 191
- HGNC: 343
- OMIM: 180960
- RefSeq: NM_000687
- UniProt: P23526

Other data
- EC number: 3.3.1.1
- Locus: Chr. 20 q11.22
Search for
- Structures: Swiss-model
- Domains: InterPro

S-adenosyl-L-homocysteine hydrolase
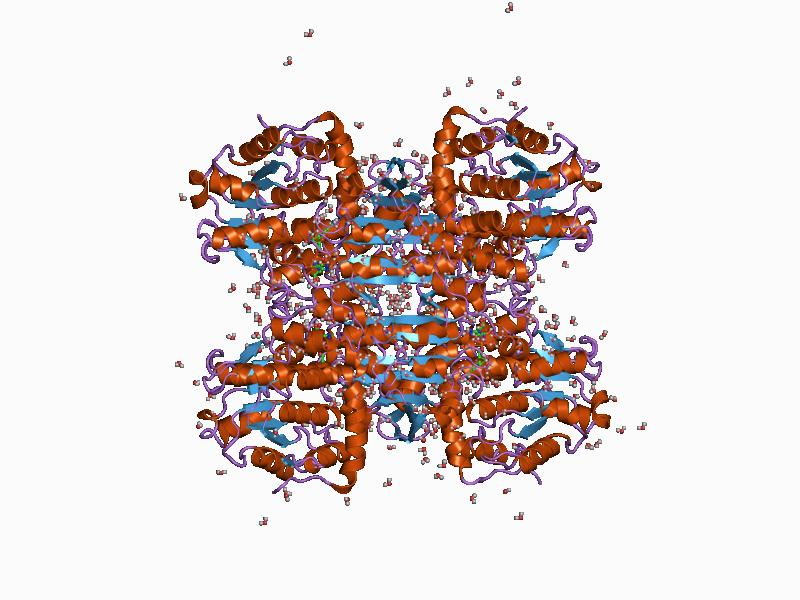
- Structure of S-adenosylhomocysteine hydrolase from rat liver.

Identifiers
- Symbol: Ad_hcy_hydrolase
- Pfam: PF05221
- InterPro: IPR000043
- PROSITE: PDOC00603
- SCOP2: 1b3r / SCOPe / SUPFAM
Available protein structures:
- PDB: 1a7a, 1b3r, 1d4f, 1k0u, 1ky4, 1ky5, 1li4, 1v8b, 1xwf IPR000043 PF05221 (ECOD; PDBsum)
- AlphaFold: IPR000043; PF05221

AdoHcyase NAD-binding domain
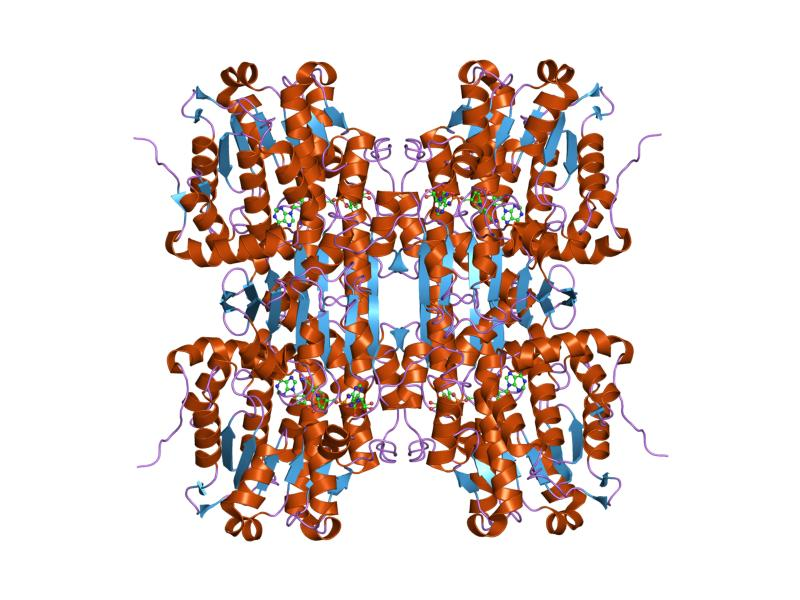
- d244e mutant s-adenosylhomocysteine hydrolase refined with noncrystallographic restraints

Identifiers
- Symbol: AdoHcyase_NAD
- Pfam: PF00670
- Pfam clan: CL0063
- InterPro: IPR015878
- PROSITE: PDOC00603
- SCOP2: 1b3r / SCOPe / SUPFAM
Available protein structures:
- PDB: IPR015878 PF00670 (ECOD; PDBsum)
- AlphaFold: IPR015878; PF00670

Adenosylhomocysteinase (EC 3.13.2.1) is an enzyme that catalyzes the nicotinamide adenine dinucleotide (NAD^{+}) dependent, reversible hydrolysis of S-adenosyl-L-homocysteine to L-homocysteine and adenosine. By breaking down S-adenosylhomocysteine, an inhibitor of methyltransferases, the enzyme helps maintain cellular methylation levels.

AdoHcyase is encoded by the AHCY gene in humans.

== Structure ==
AdoHcyase is a highly conserved protein with about 430 to 470 amino acids. The family contains a glycine-rich region in the central part of AdoHcyase; a region thought to be involved in NAD-binding. AdoHcyase binds one NAD^{+} cofactor per subunit. This protein may use the morpheein model of allosteric regulation.

== Catalytic mechanism ==
S-adenosyl-L-homocysteine
H_{2}O
H_{2}O
L-homocysteine
+
adenosine

Overall hydrolysis begins with dehydrogenative oxidation of the 3'-OH of the ribose by NAD^{+} (forming NADH). The resulting ketone is α-deprotonated to the enol before elimination of the homocysteine thiolate. Water then adds to the a,b-unsaturated ketone, before reduction of the resultant ketone by NADH.

== Function ==
Adenosylhomocysteinase directly converts SAH into homocysteine and adenosine. As a metabolic enzyme, AHCY has a key role in regulating the methylation potential of nucleic acids at a cellular level. AHCY has also been discovered to have a role as a "metabolic gatekeeper", which is involved in interactions between epigenetics and one-carbon metabolism.

By controlling homocysteine levels, AHCY takes part in regulation of chromatin availability and developmental stress responses, which can have significant implications for supporting stem cell pluripotency, influencing expression of genes, differentiation of adipocytes, and regulation of normal function of the cell-cycle. The impact of alterations of these processes can have a variety of downstream effects that can have significant clinical relevance.

== Clinical significance ==
The AHCY gene is believed to have a prognostic role in neuroblastoma.

AdoHcyase is significantly associated with adenosine deaminase deficiency, which classically manifests in severe combined immunodeficiency (SCID). Accumulated adenosine derivatives, dATPs, irreversibly bind to and inhibit AdoHcyase, promoting the buildup of S-adenosyl-L-homocysteine (SAH), a potent inhibitor of methyl transfer reactions, due to an equilibrium constant that favors SAH.

Recent study has put AHCY regulation into a focus of therapeutic intervention. Higher levels of AHCY transcriptional upregulation are seen in patients with colorectal cancer (CRC).
