= S-Adenosylmethionine synthetase =

Methionine adenosyltransferase
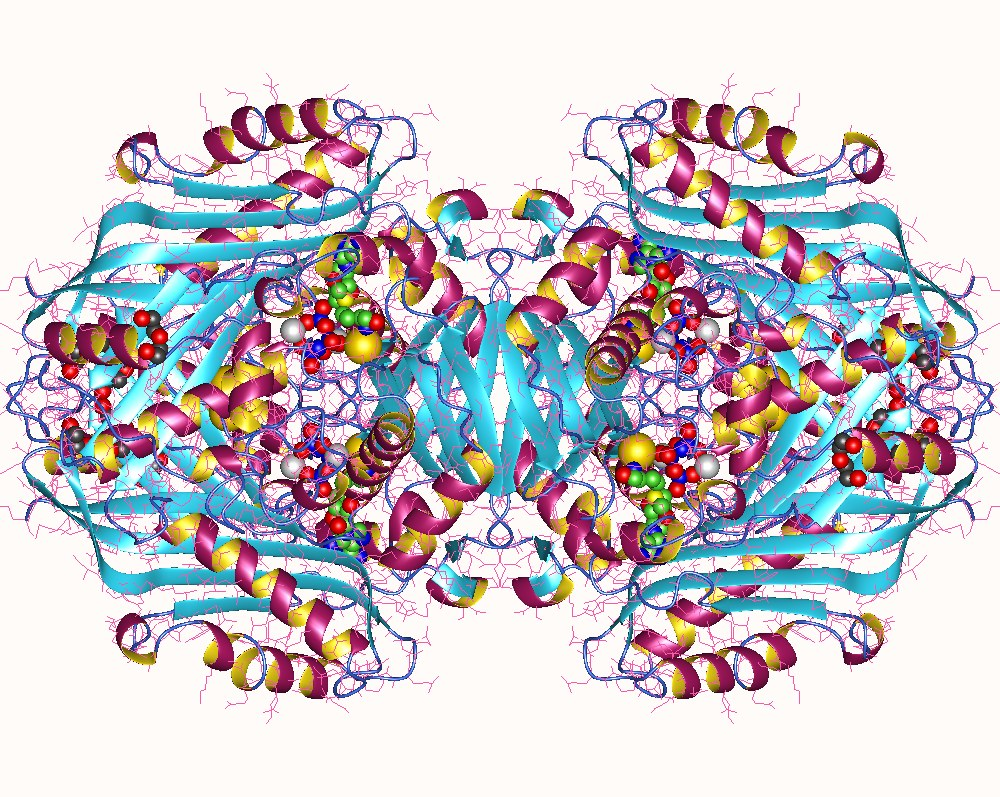
- S-adenosylmethionine synthase 2, tetramer, Human

Identifiers
- EC no.: 2.5.1.6
- CAS no.: 9012-52-6

Databases
- BRENDA: enzyme data
- ExPASy: NiceZyme view
- KEGG: enzyme entry
- MetaCyc: metabolic pathway
- Rhea: reactions
- PDB structures: RCSB PDB PDBe PDBsum
Search
- PMC: articles
- PubMed: articles
- NCBI: proteins

S-Adenosylmethionine synthetase (EC 2.5.1.6), also known as methionine adenosyltransferase (MAT), is an enzyme that creates S-adenosylmethionine (also known as AdoMet, SAM or SAMe) by reacting methionine (a non-polar amino acid) and ATP (the basic currency of energy).

Three types of MAT have been identified in mammals, and are denoted MAT I, II, and III. MAT I (resp. III) is composed of 4 (resp. 2) copies of the protein subunit coded by the gene MAT1A, while MAT II is a more complicated complex of the subunits coded by MAT2A and MAT2B.

== Function ==
AdoMet is a methyl donor for transmethylation. It gives away its methyl group and is also the propylamino donor in polyamine biosynthesis. S-adenosylmethionine synthesis can be considered the rate-limiting step of the methionine cycle.

As a methyl donor SAM allows DNA methylation. Once DNA is methylated, it switches the genes off and therefore, S-adenosylmethionine can be considered to control gene expression.

SAM is also involved in gene transcription, cell proliferation, and production of secondary metabolites. Hence SAM synthetase is fast becoming a drug target, in particular for the following diseases: depression, dementia, vacuolar myelopathy, liver injury, migraine, osteoarthritis, and as a potential cancer chemopreventive agent.

This article discusses the protein domains that make up the SAM synthetase enzyme and how these domains contribute to its function. More specifically, this article explores the shared pseudo-3-fold symmetry that makes the domains well-adapted to their functions.

This enzyme catalyses the following chemical reaction

ATP + L-methionine + H_{2}O $\rightleftharpoons$ phosphate + diphosphate + S-adenosyl-L-methionine

== Conserved motifs in the 3'UTR of MAT2A mRNA ==
A computational comparative analysis of vertebrate genome sequences have identified a cluster of 6 conserved hairpin motifs in the 3'UTR of the MAT2A messenger RNA (mRNA) transcript. The predicted hairpins (named A-F) have strong evolutionary conservation and 3 of the predicted RNA structures (hairpins A, C and D) have been confirmed by in-line probing analysis. No structural changes were observed for any of the hairpins in the presence of metabolites SAM, S-adenosylhomocysteine or L-Methionine. They are proposed to be involved in transcript stability and their functionality is currently under investigation.

== Protein overview ==
The S-adenosylmethionine synthetase enzyme is found in almost every organism bar parasites which obtain AdoMet from their host. Isoenzymes are found in bacteria, budding yeast and even in mammalian mitochondria. Most MATs are homo-oligomers and the majority are tetramers. The monomers are organised into three domains formed by nonconsecutive stretches of the sequence, and the subunits interact through a large flat hydrophobic surface to form the dimers.

== S-adenosylmethionine synthetase N terminal domain ==
S-adenosylmethionine synthetase N terminal domain
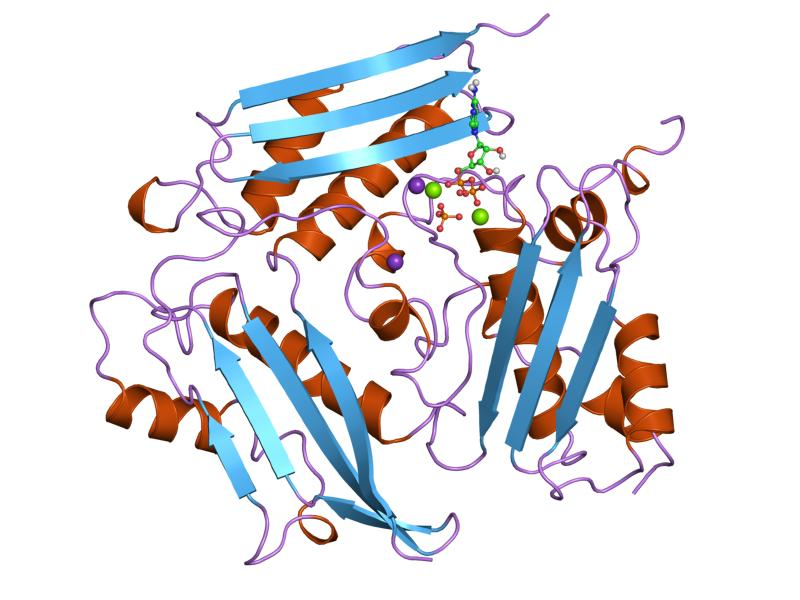
- S-adenosylmethionine synthetase with ADP

Identifiers
- Symbol: S-AdoMet_synt_N
- Pfam: PF00438
- InterPro: IPR022628
- PROSITE: PDOC00369
- SCOP2: 1mxa / SCOPe / SUPFAM
Available protein structures:
- PDB: IPR022628 PF00438 (ECOD; PDBsum)
- AlphaFold: IPR022628; PF00438

In molecular biology the protein domain S-adenosylmethionine synthetase N terminal domain is found at the N-terminal of the enzyme.

=== N terminal domain function ===
The N terminal domain is well conserved across different species. This may be due to its important function in substrate and cation binding. The residues involved in methionine binding are found in the N-terminal domain.

=== N terminal domain structure ===
The N terminal region contains two alpha helices and four beta strands.

== S-adenosylmethionine synthetase Central domain ==
S-adenosylmethionine synthetase Central domain
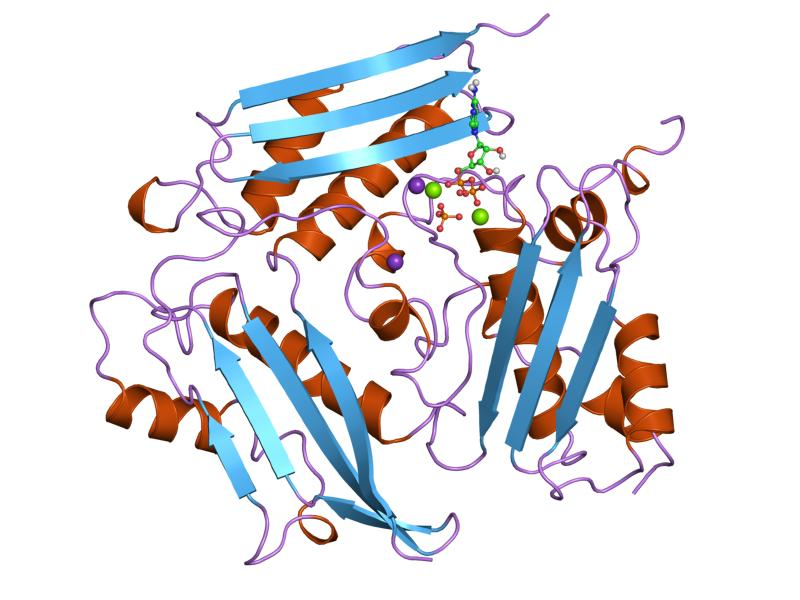
- S-adenosylmethionine synthetase with ADP

Identifiers
- Symbol: S-AdoMet_synt_M
- Pfam: PF02772
- InterPro: IPR022629
- PROSITE: PDOC00369
- SCOP2: 1mxa / SCOPe / SUPFAM
Available protein structures:
- PDB: IPR022629 PF02772 (ECOD; PDBsum)
- AlphaFold: IPR022629; PF02772

=== Central terminal domain function ===
The precise function of the central domain has not been fully elucidated, but it is thought to be important in aiding catalysis.

=== Central domain structure ===
The central region contains two alpha helices and four beta strands.

== S-adenosylmethionine synthetase, C terminal domain ==
S-adenosylmethionine synthetase, C-terminal domain
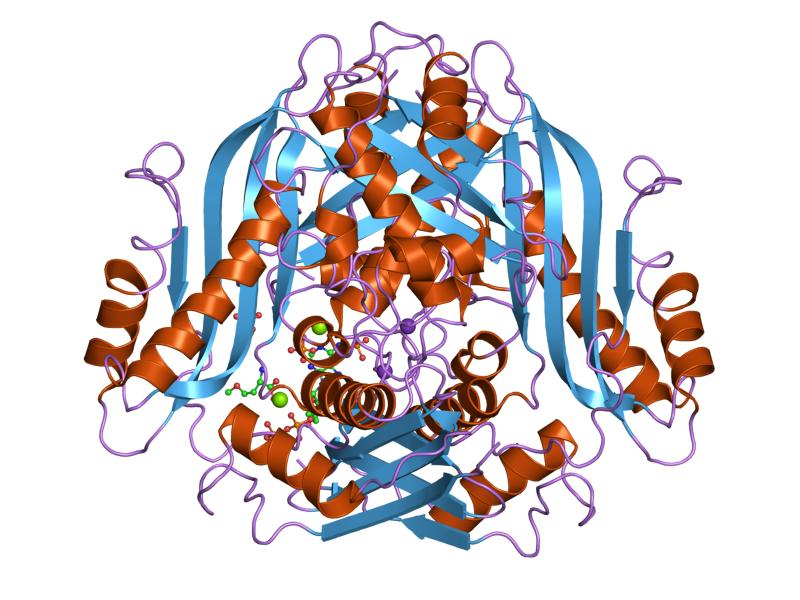
- Methionine adenosyltransferase in a complex ADP and l-methionine.

Identifiers
- Symbol: S-AdoMet_synt_C
- Pfam: PF02773
- InterPro: IPR022630
- PROSITE: PDOC00369
- SCOP2: 1mxa / SCOPe / SUPFAM
Available protein structures:
- PDB: IPR022630 PF02773 (ECOD; PDBsum)
- AlphaFold: IPR022630; PF02773

In molecular biology, the protein domain S-adenosylmethionine synthetase, C-terminal domain refers to the C terminus of the S-adenosylmethionine synthetase

=== C terminal domain function ===
The function of the C-terminal domain has been experimentally determined as being important for cytoplasmic localisation. The residues are scattered along the C-terminal domain sequence however once the protein folds, they position themselves closely together.

=== C terminal domain structure ===
The C-terminal domains contains two alpha-helices and four beta-strands.
