= Protein detoxification =

Protein detoxification is the process by which proteins containing methylated arginine are broken down and removed from the body.

Arginine (Arg) is a non-essential amino acid and one of the most commonly occurring natural amino acids. Methylated arginine is a modified version of arginine that is commonly formed from protein arginine (arginine incorporated in protein). Asymmetrically methylated forms of arginine are toxic when released during protein turnover.

The protein detoxification pathway eliminates free methylated-arginine derivatives from the cell. Symmetrically methylated forms are not toxic and are excreted unchanged by the kidney. Asymmetrically methylated forms however are toxic and must first be broken down. This step requires the enzyme dimethylarginine dimethylaminohydrolase (DDAH). Impairment of DDAH function slows breakdown and increases the level of toxic asymmetrically methylated arginine forms.

Long term exposure to these toxic amino acids is associated with endothelial dysfunction, arterial stiffness, insulin resistance, chronic kidney disease, heart disease, dementia and ageing.

Therapeutic strategies that target the protein detoxification pathway aim to:

- reduce intracellular levels of free asymmetrically methylated arginine derivatives,
- slow the ageing process
- delay the development of disorders associated with ageing.

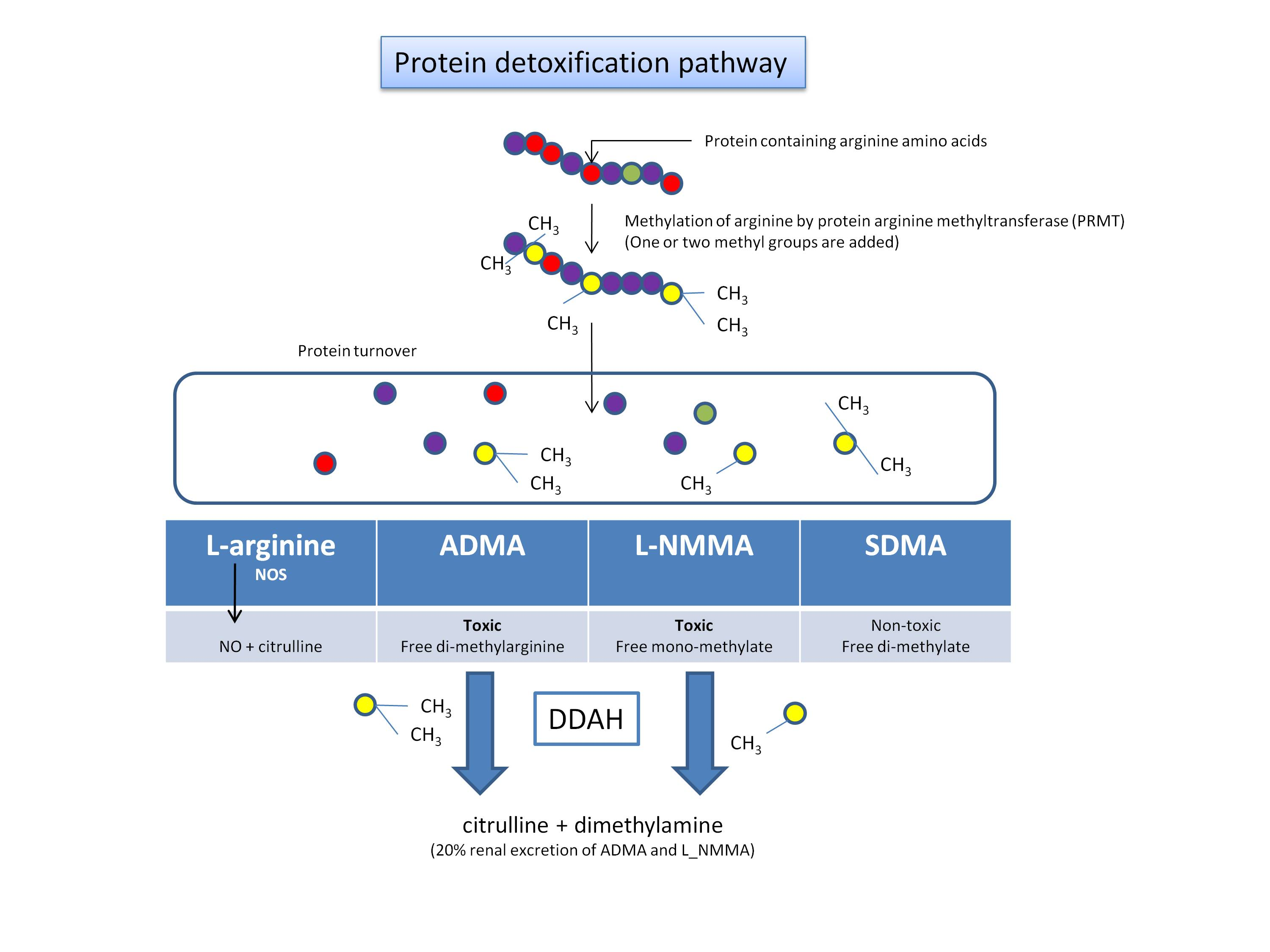
Protein detoxification pathway.

== History ==
In 1970, it was demonstrated that protein turnover releases the free methylated arginine derivatives:

1. asymmetric dimethylarginine (ADMA),
2. methylarginine, (also referred to as N-methyl-L-arginine, N-monomethylargine or L-NMMA), and
3. symmetrical dimethylarginine (SDMA).

The potential toxicity of the two asymmetrically methylated amino acids however was not fully appreciated until 1992 when Patrick Vallance and his London co-workers at the Wellcome Research Laboratories demonstrated that ADMA inhibits nitric oxide synthase (NOS). Then, in 1996 MacAllister at St George's Hospital Medical School in London, recognised that inhibiting the enzyme DDAH increases intracellular concentrations of ADMA. To describe the process of protein turnover, the elimination of free methylated arginine derivatives and the catabolism of the two asymmetrically methylated arginine derivatives ADMA and L-NMMA, the Australian physician Trevor Tingate coined the term protein detoxification in 2010.

== Synthesis and clearance ==
Protein arginine methylation occurs posttranslationally and is catalysed by protein arginine methyltransferase (PRMT). No direct synthesis of methylated arginine derivatives occurs from the free amino acid. The methylation of protein arginine plays an important role in the regulation of many cell processes including gene transcription, cell signal transduction, DNA repair and RNA processing.

During protein turnover three arginine methylated derivatives are released: L-NMMA, SDMA and ADMA.

SDMA is not directly toxic and is eliminated unchanged by renal excretion.
L-NMMA and ADMA however, are both potent inhibitors of NOS.

Around 60 mg of ADMA is produced per day. Unlike SDMA, 80% of ADMA and NMMA is catabolised by the enzyme DDAH. The activity of DDAH is therefore an important determinant of ADMA and NMMA levels, and thus NOS activity.

Enzymes, arginine and the free asymmetrically methylated arginine derivatives

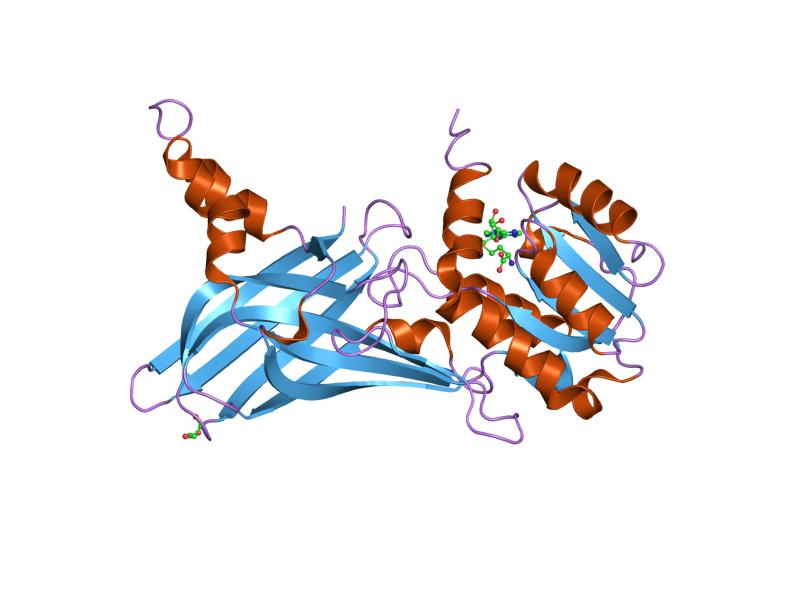
Protein arginine N-methyltransferase 1 (PRMT1)

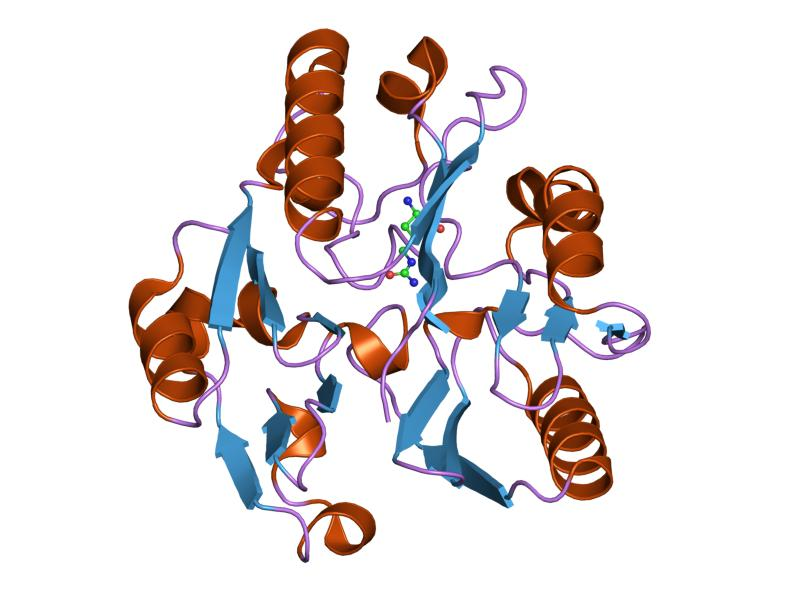
Dimethylarginine dimethylaminohydrolase (DDAH)

Asymmetric dimethylarginine (ADMA)

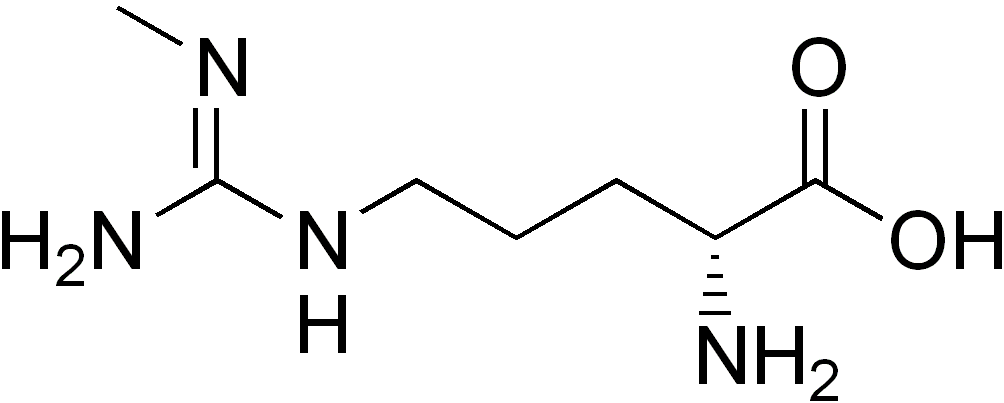
N-methyl-L-arginine (L-NMMA)

=== PRMTs ===
Protein arginine methyltransferase's (PRMTs) are activated by shear stress and LDL cholesterol. Two types of PMRTs have been characterised.

Type 1 PRMTs are found mainly in endothelial and smooth muscle cells and produce methylated proteins containing ADMA and L-NMMA.
Type 2 PRMTs produce proteins that contain SDMA and L-NMMA.

=== DDAH ===
Dimethylarginine dimethylaminohydrolase (DDAH) activity is inhibited by NO, reactive oxygen species (ROS) and L-arginine.

Two isoforms of DDAH have been identified.

DDAH-1 is found in tissues expressing neuronal NOS (nNOS) and in the liver, kidney and lung. Expression is increased by IL-1β and inhibited by oxLDL and TNF. Plasma levels of ADMA reflect DDAH-1 activity.

DDAH-2 is found in tissues expressing endothelial NOS (eNOS) and inducible NOS (iNOS). Expression is increased by NADPHox, all trans retinoic acid, pioglitazone and estradiol and inhibited by hypoxia, hyperglycaemia and LPS.

== Role in disease ==
Asymmetrically methylated arginine forms (AMAF) inhibit nitric oxide synthase and the formation of nitric oxide (NO), also known as 'endothelium-derived relaxing factor', or 'EDRF'. Nitric oxide is critical to blood vessel function and inhibition leads to an increase in arterial stiffness due to vasoconstriction. Indeed, by protecting the vessel against vasoconstriction nitric oxide has been referred to as the fountain of youth. It also protects blood vessels by inhibiting platelet activation, smooth muscle proliferation and endothelial cell activation.

Reduced arterial stiffness protects the heart. Asymmetrically methylated arginine forms by contrast inhibit NOS, reduce nitric oxide and increase central arterial pressure.

Long-standing arterial stiffness inevitably leads to heart failure, kidney failure and dementia; the three leading causes of death in later years. Protein detoxification removes free methylarginines that would otherwise inhibit the generation of nitric oxide. The pathway is an important determinant of the speed by which diseases of ageing will ultimately manifest.

Vascular endothelium

Shear stress in micro-circulation as a result of arterial stiffness

Endothelial dysfunction associated inhibtion of eNOS, reduced NO and vasoconstriction is associated with arterial stiffness. Increased pulse pressure drives arterial pulsations further down the arterial tree, increasing shear stress.

== Aging ==
When William Osler stated that “man is as old as his arteries” he referred to arterial stiffening, a condition now acknowledged as an integrated biomarker of ageing.

Preservation of the arterial tree in a relaxed and elastic state is core doctrum of anti-ageing medicine. The recognition of free methylarginine derivatives as toxins that accelerate ageing by inhibiting the production of nitric oxide focuses on the importance of maintaining the protein detoxification pathway.

This can be achieved by a combination of dietary, behavioural and therapeutic interventions.
