= Bromoureide =

Bromoureides are sedative-hypnotics available mainly in Europe and Asia, including acecarbromal, bromisoval, and carbromal (Horowitz, 1997). They are a subfamily of the ureides (acylureas).

== See also ==
- Apronal
- Corvalol
