= Aceturic acid =

Names
- Preferred IUPAC name Acetamidoacetic acid
- Other names Acetylglycine; N-Acetylglycine; 2-Acetamidoacetic acid Acetylglycocoll

Identifiers
| CAS Number | 543-24-8 |
| 3D model (JSmol) | Interactive image |
| Abbreviations | AcGly |
| ChEMBL | ChEMBL289004 |
| ChemSpider | 10507 |
| DrugBank | DB02713 |
| ECHA InfoCard | 100.008.036 |
| EC Number | 208-839-6 |
| PubChem CID | 10972 |
| UNII | U2UT4677KR |
| CompTox Dashboard (EPA) | DTXSID2043793 |
- InChI: InChI=1S/C4H7NO3/c1-3(6)5-2-4(7)8/h2H2,1H3,(H,5,6)(H,7,8) Key: OKJIRPAQVSHGFK-UHFFFAOYSA-N
- SMILES: CC(=O)NCC(=O)O

Properties
| Chemical formula | C_{4}H_{7}NO_{3} |
| Molar mass | 117.104 g·mol^{−1} |
| Appearance | White powder or needles |
| Melting point | 206 to 208 °C (403 to 406 °F; 479 to 481 K) |
| Solubility in water | 2.7% at 15 °C |
| Acidity (pK_{a}) | 3.67 (H_{2}O) |

Related compounds
| Related compounds | N-Acetylglycinamide |
- Except where otherwise noted, data are given for materials in their standard state (at 25 °C [77 °F], 100 kPa). Infobox references

Aceturic acid (N-acetylglycine) is a derivative of the amino acid glycine. The conjugate base of this carboxylic acid is called aceturate, a term used for its esters and salts.

== Preparation ==
Aceturic acid can be prepared by warming glycine either with a slight excess of acetic anhydride in benzene, or with an equal molar amount of acetic anhydride in glacial (concentrated) acetic acid.

== See also ==
- Aceglutamide (α-N-Acetylglutamine)
- N-Acetylaspartic acid
- N-Acetylcysteine
- N-Acetylglutamic acid
- N-Acetylleucine
- N^{ε}-Acetyllysine
- N-Acetyltyrosine
- Aceburic acid
