= Dimethylargininase =

Class of enzymes

dimethylargininase
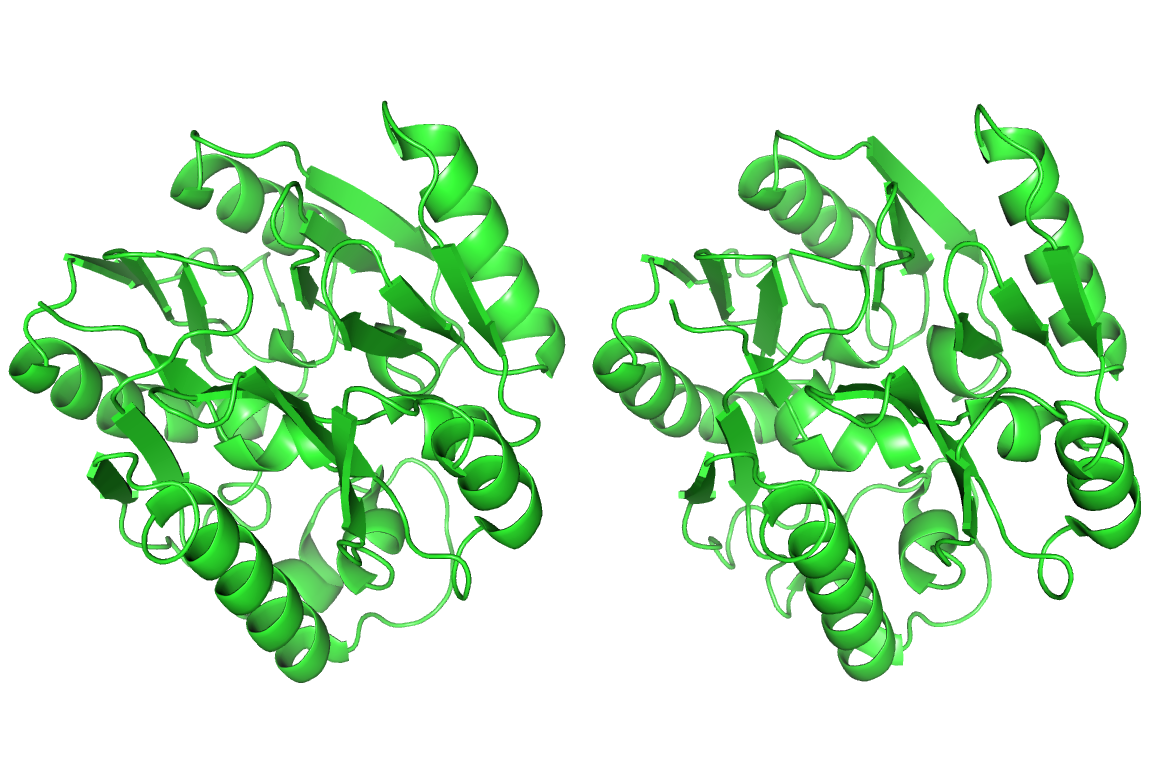
- Ribbon diagram of human DDAH1.

Identifiers
- EC no.: 3.5.3.18
- CAS no.: 123644-75-7

Databases
- BRENDA: enzyme data
- ExPASy: NiceZyme view
- KEGG: enzyme entry
- MetaCyc: metabolic pathway
- Rhea: reactions
- PDB structures: RCSB PDB PDBe PDBsum
- Gene Ontology: AmiGO / QuickGO
Search
- PMC: articles
- PubMed: articles
- NCBI: proteins

Dimethylargininase, also known as a dimethylarginine dimethylaminohydrolase (DDAH), is an enzyme that catalyzes the hydrolysis of N^{ω},N^{ω}-dimethyl-L-arginine, also known as asymmetric dimethylarginine (ADMA) to citrulline and dimethylamine:

ADMA
H_{2}O
citrulline
+
dimethylamine

== Isozymes ==
Dimethylarginine dimethylaminohydrolase is an enzyme found in all mammalian cells. Two isoforms exist, DDAH I and DDAH II, with some differences in tissue distribution of the two isoforms). The enzyme degrades methylarginines, specifically asymmetric dimethylarginine (ADMA) and NG-monomethyl-L-arginine (MMA).

dimethylarginine dimethylaminohydrolase 1

Identifiers
- Symbol: DDAH1
- NCBI gene: 23576
- HGNC: 2715
- OMIM: 604743
- RefSeq: NM_012137
- UniProt: O94760

Other data
- EC number: 3.5.3.18
- Locus: Chr. 1 p22
Search for
- Structures: Swiss-model
- Domains: InterPro

dimethylarginine dimethylaminohydrolase 2

Identifiers
- Symbol: DDAH2
- NCBI gene: 23564
- HGNC: 2716
- OMIM: 604744
- RefSeq: NM_013974
- UniProt: O95865

Other data
- EC number: 3.5.3.18
- Locus: Chr. 6 p21
Search for
- Structures: Swiss-model
- Domains: InterPro

== Function ==
The methylarginines ADMA and MMA inhibit the enzyme nitric oxide synthase. As such, DDAH is important in removing methylarginines, generated by protein degradation, from accumulating and inhibiting the generation of nitric oxide.

== Clinical significance ==
Inhibition of DDAH activity causes methylarginines to accumulate, blocking nitric oxide(NO) synthesis and causing vasoconstriction. An impairment of DDAH activity appears to be involved in the elevation of plasma ADMA, and impairment of vascular relaxation observed in humans with cardiovascular disease or risk factors (such as hypercholesterolemia, diabetes mellitus, and insulin resistance). The activity of DDAH is impaired by oxidative stress, permitting ADMA to accumulate. A wide range of pathologic stimuli induce endothelial oxidative stress such as oxidized LDL-cholesterol, inflammatory cytokines, hyperhomocysteinemia, hyperglycemia and infectious agents. Each of these insults attenuates DDAH activity in vitro and in vivo. The attenuation of DDAH allows ADMA to accumulate, and to block NO synthesis. The adverse effect of these stimuli can be reversed in vitro by antioxidants, which preserve the activity of DDAH.

The sensitivity of DDAH to oxidative stress is conferred by a critical sulfhydryl in the active site of the enzyme that is required for the metabolism of ADMA. This sulfhydryl can also be reversibly inhibited by NO in an elegant form of negative feedback. Homocysteine (a putative cardiovascular risk factor) mounts an oxidative attack on DDAH to form a mixed disulfide, inactivating the enzyme. By oxidizing a sulfhydryl moiety critical for DDAH activity, homocysteine and other risk factors cause ADMA to accumulate and to suppress nitric oxide synthase (NOS) activity.

The critical role of DDAH activity in regulating NO synthesis in vivo was demonstrated using a transgenic DDAH mouse. In this animal, the activity of DDAH is increased, and plasma ADMA levels are reduced by 50%. The reduction in plasma ADMA is associated with a significant increase in NOS activity, as plasma and urinary nitrate levels are doubled. The increase in NOS activity translates into a 15mmHg reduction in systolic blood pressure in the transgenic mouse. This study provides evidence for the importance of DDAH activity and plasma ADMA levels in the regulation of NO synthesis. Subsequent studies have shown that DDAH transgenic animals also manifest improvements in endothelial regeneration and angiogenesis, and reduced vascular obstructive disease, in association with the reduced plasma levels of ADMA. These findings are consistent with evidence from a number of groups that nitric oxide plays a critical role in vascular regeneration. By contrast, elevations in ADMA impair angiogenesis. These insights into the role of DDAH in degrading endogenous inhibitors of NOS, and thereby maintaining vascular NO production, may have important implications in vascular health and therapy for cardiovascular disease.

== See also ==
- Protein detoxification
