= Acylurea =

Class of chemical compounds formally derived from the acylation of urea

General chemical structure of an acylurea

Acylureas (also called N-acylureas or ureides) are a class of chemical compounds formally derived from the acylation of urea.

== Uses ==
=== Insecticides ===
A subclass of acylureas known as benzoylureas are insecticides. They act as insect growth regulators by inhibiting the synthesis of chitin resulting in weakened cuticles and preventing molting. Members of this class include diflubenzuron, flufenoxuron, hexaflumuron, lufenuron, and teflubenzuron.

=== Anticonvulsants and sedatives ===
The acylurea functional group is also found in some pharmaceutical drugs such as the anticonvulsants phenacemide, pheneturide, chlorphenacemide, and acetylpheneturide (which are phenylureides), and the sedatives acecarbromal, bromisoval, and carbromal (which are bromoureides). Others include apronal (apronalide), capuride, and ectylurea. Barbiturates (a class of cyclic ureas) are structurally and mechanistically related to them. The phenylureides are also closely related to the hydantoins, such as phenytoin, and may be considered ring-opened analogues of them.

== Related ==
In allophanic acid (and its esters), R is a hydroxyl group (resp. alkoxyl).

=== Diureides ===
A diureide is a complex nitrogenous substance regarded as containing two molecules of urea or their radicals, e.g. uric acid or allantoin.

=== Hydantoins ===
Hydantoin, or glycolylurea, can be considered the cyclic form of acylurea.
