= Creatine-alpha ketoglutarate =

Creatine-alpha-ketoglutarate is a salt formed from alpha-ketoglutaric acid (AKG) and creatine.

Creatine is a mass-produced fitness supplement that is supposed to increase the user's muscle mass, strength and power. Creatine requires a delivery system for cell uptake. An example is arginine alpha-ketoglutarate. Arginine alpha-ketoglutarate itself is a chemical compound that is supposed to increase the blood flow to muscles and therefore, increase nutrient delivery to muscle cells.

Alpha-ketoglutarate (α-KG or AKG) itself is a central molecule in the Krebs cycle that controls the organism's overall citric acid cycle rate. It can improve bone tissue development in the skeletal muscles by decreasing protein catabolism and increasing protein synthesis. The supplement industry has theorized that binding creatine to alpha-ketoglutarate could show significant improvements in creatine delivery and uptake which would ultimately lead to greater improvements in muscle mass and performance. Still relatively new in the fitness industry, more research is needed to test the validity of its effects.
