= Freezing Point =

Freezing Point may refer to:

- Freezing Point (Miura novel), a 1965 Japanese novel by Ayako Miura
  - Freezing Point, a 1967 South Korean film directed by Kim Soo-yong, based on the novel
- Freezing Point (Bodelsen novel), a 1969 Danish novel by Anders Bodelsen
- Freezing Point (magazine), a Chinese magazine

== See also ==
- Melting point, the temperature of solid-liquid state change
