= C5H8N2O5 =

The molecular formula C_{5}H_{8}N_{2}O_{5} (molar mass: 176.13 g/mol, exact mass: 176.0433 u) may refer to:

- Carbamoyl aspartic acid (or ureidosuccinic acid)
- Oxalyldiaminopropionic acid
