= Bromisoval =

- Skeletal formula of bromisoval

Names
- IUPAC name (RS)-2-Bromo-N-carbamoyl-3-methylbutanamide

Identifiers
CAS Number	496-67-3; 27109-49-5 R; 27109-48-4 S
3D model (JSmol)	Interactive image
ChEBI	CHEBI:31304
ChEMBL	ChEMBL1515611
ChemSpider	2353; 129594 R; 643139 S
ECHA InfoCard	100.007.115
EC Number	207-825-7
KEGG	D01391
MeSH	Bromisovalum
PubChem CID	2447; 146955 R; 735997 S
UNII	469GW8R486; 3DY4YGA2PX R; GTJ4Y0JW4D S
CompTox Dashboard (EPA)	DTXSID2040656
- InChI: InChI=1S/C6H11BrN2O2/c1-3(2)4(7)5(10)9-6(8)11/h3-4H,1-2H3,(H3,8,9,10,11) Key: CMCCHHWTTBEZNM-UHFFFAOYSA-N
- SMILES: CC(C)C(Br)C(=O)NC(N)=O

Properties
Chemical formula	C_{6}H_{11}BrN_{2}O_{2}
Molar mass	223.070 g·mol^{−1}
log P	1.057
Acidity (pK_{a})	10.536
Basicity (pK_{b})	3.461

Pharmacology
ATC code	N05CM03 (WHO)
Routes of administration	Oral

Related compounds
Related ureas	Carbromal
Related compounds	3-Ureidopropionic acid; beta-Ureidoisobutyric acid; Carbamoyl aspartic acid; N-Acetylaspartic acid; Aceglutamide; N-Acetylglutamic acid; Citrulline
- Except where otherwise noted, data are given for materials in their standard state (at 25 °C [77 °F], 100 kPa). Infobox references

Bromisoval (INN), commonly known as bromovalerylurea, is a hypnotic and sedative of the bromoureide group discovered by Knoll in 1907 and patented in 1909. It is marketed over the counter in Asia under various trade names (such as Brovarin), usually in combination with nonsteroidal anti-inflammatory drugs.

Bromisoval can be prepared by bromination of isovaleric acid by the Hell-Volhard-Zelinsky reaction followed by reaction with urea.

== Toxicity ==
Chronic use of bromisoval has been associated with bromine poisoning.

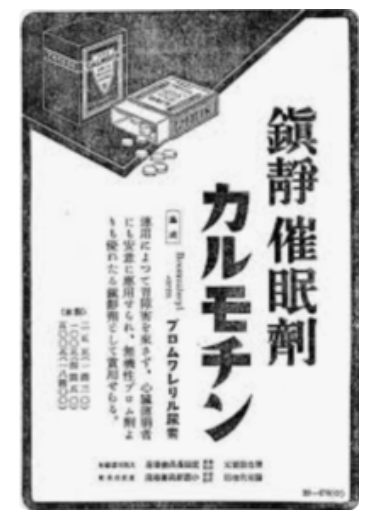
Old advertisement for Calmotin.

It was commonly used in Japan for suicide by overdose. In the 1950s and 1960s, ~4,000 people died each year from bromide poisoning, most commonly from bromvalerylurea. In Japan, one popular formulation was Calmotin [カルモチン]. Osamu Dazai attempted a double complex suicide with Shimeko Tanabe by overdosing on Calmotin, then drowning at sea. Only Shimeko died. This became the basis for The Flowers of Buffoonery.

The drug was also referred to as the suicide drug in several literature works, including Freezing Point (suicide attempt of the heroine 陽子), The Sea of Fertility (suicide attempt of the heroine's maid, 蓼科).

== See also ==
- Acecarbromal
- Carbromal
- Apronal
