= C4H8N2O3 =

The organic molecular formula C_{4}H_{8}N_{2}O_{3} (molar mass: ≈ 132.12 g/mol) is an acyclic compound that may refer to structural isomers such as:

- Asparagine: one of the 20 naturally occurring α-amino acids that is used to biosynthesize proteins.
- Glycylglycine: a dipeptide synthesized from glycine residues that functions as a gamma-glutamyl acceptor.
- Methylazoxymethanol acetate (cycasin acetate): a neurotoxic prodrug, which inhibits hepatic DNA, RNA, and protein synthesis. This compound is used to create animal models of schizophrenia or epilepsy, and is an azoxy compound with carcinogenic properties.
- 3-Ureidopropionic acid (N-carbamoyl-β-alanine): a natural organic compound that functions as an intermediate metabolite in the breakdown (catabolism) of the pyrimidine base uracil.
