= Α-Endopsychosin =

α-Endopsychosin
Identifiers
CAS Number	99638-41-2
- Except where otherwise noted, data are given for materials in their standard state (at 25 °C [77 °F], 100 kPa). Infobox references

α-Endopsychosin is a putative antagonist of the phencyclidine site of the NMDA receptor which was discovered in extracts of porcine brain and may also be endogenous in humans. The compound appears to be a peptide, but has yet to be purified and fully characterized.

== See also ==
- Dimethyltryptamine (DMT)
- N-Acetylaspartylglutamic acid
- Ketamine
- Phencyclidine (PCP)
