= NAAG =

NAAG may refer to:

- National Association of Attorneys General, a US organization
- N-Acetylaspartylglutamic acid, a neurotransmitter
- Naag is the Hindi name for the Asian Cobra
- NATO Army Armament Group, one of the Major Armament Groups (MAG) of the North Atlantic Treaty Organization
