= C4H7NO3 =

The molecular formula C_{4}H_{7}NO_{3} (molar mass: 117.104 g/mol) may refer to:

- Aceturic acid
- L-Aspartic-4-semialdehyde
