= Aspartate N-acetyltransferase =

Identifiers
- EC no.: 2.3.1.17
- CAS no.: 9029-99-6

Databases
- IntEnz: IntEnz view
- BRENDA: BRENDA entry
- ExPASy: NiceZyme view
- KEGG: KEGG entry
- MetaCyc: metabolic pathway
- PRIAM: profile
- PDB structures: RCSB PDB PDBe PDBsum
- Gene Ontology: AmiGO / QuickGO
Search
- PMC: articles
- PubMed: articles
- NCBI: proteins

Aspartate N-acetyltransferase (EC 2.3.1.17) is an enzyme that catalyzes the chemical reaction

aspartic acid
+
acetyl-CoA
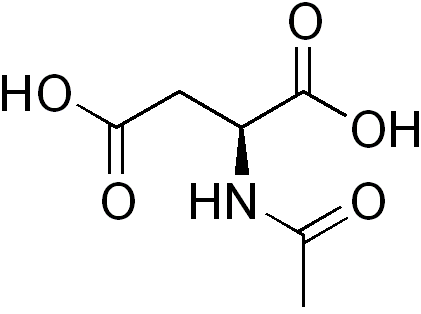
N-Acetylaspartic acid
+ coenzyme A

The two substrates of this enzyme are aspartic acid and acetyl-CoA. Its products are N-acetylaspartic acid and coenzyme A.

This enzyme belongs to the family of transferases, specifically those acyltransferases transferring groups other than aminoacyl groups. The systematic name of this enzyme class is acetyl-CoA:L-aspartate N-acetyltransferase. Other names in common use include aspartate acetyltransferase, and L-aspartate N-acetyltransferase.
