= Chlorphenacemide =

Chemical compound

Clinical data
- Trade names: Comitiadon

Identifiers
- IUPAC name: N-Carbamoyl-2-chloro-2-phenylacetamide
- CAS Number: 25395-28-2
- PubChem CID: 265950
- ChemSpider: 233733
- UNII: F18658W53B
- ChEMBL: ChEMBL462571
- CompTox Dashboard (EPA): DTXSID701043256

Chemical and physical data
- Formula: C_{9}H_{9}ClN_{2}O_{2}
- Molar mass: 212.63 g·mol^{−1}
- 3D model (JSmol): Interactive image
- SMILES: C1=CC=C(C=C1)C(C(=O)NC(=O)N)Cl
- InChI: InChI=1S/C9H9ClN2O2/c10-7(8(13)12-9(11)14)6-4-2-1-3-5-6/h1-5,7H,(H3,11,12,13,14); Key:LEJPVKTZROTWBE-UHFFFAOYSA-N

Chlorphenacemide is pharmaceutical drug of the acylurea class used as an anticonvulsant.
