= Arginine =

Amino acid

- Skeletal formula of arginine Skeletal formula of arginine

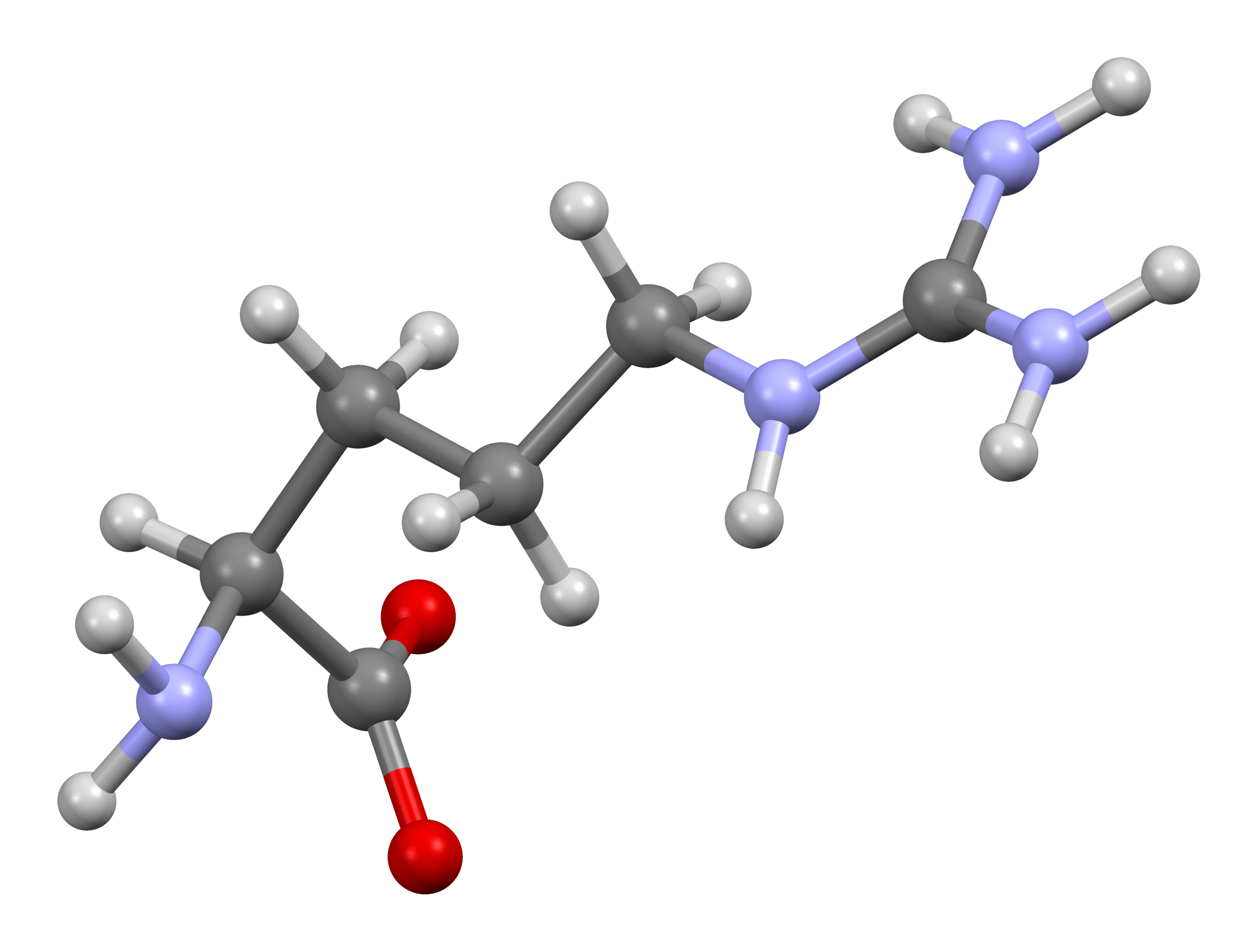
Ball-and-stick model
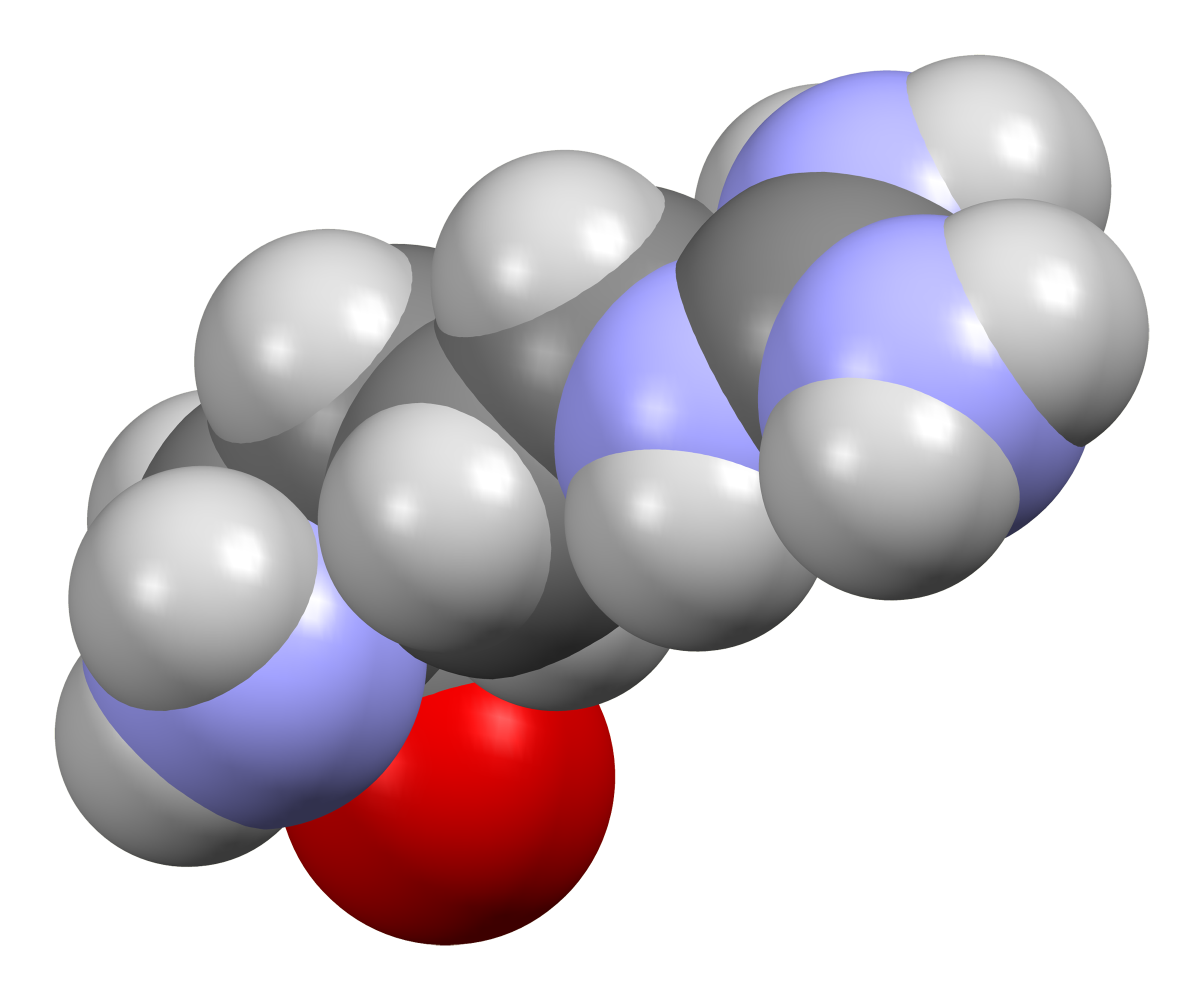
Space-filling model

Names
- IUPAC names Arginine
- Systematic IUPAC name 2-Amino-5-guanidinopentanoic acid

Identifiers
CAS Number	L: 74-79-3; D/L: 7200-25-1; D: 157-06-2; L HCl: 1119-34-2
3D model (JSmol)	L: Interactive image; D: Interactive image; L HCl: Interactive image; L Zwitterion: Interactive image
Beilstein Reference	1725411, 1725412 D, 1725413 L
ChEBI	L: CHEBI:29016
ChEMBL	L: ChEMBL1485; D: ChEMBL212301
ChemSpider	L: 6082; D/L: 227; D: 64224
DrugBank	L: DB00125
ECHA InfoCard	100.000.738
EC Number	L: 230-571-3
Gmelin Reference	364938 D
IUPHAR/BPS	L: 721
KEGG	L: C02385
MeSH	Arginine
PubChem CID	L: 6322; D/L: 232; D: 71070
RTECS number	L: CF1934200 L
UNII	L: 94ZLA3W45F; D/L: FL26NTK3EP; D: R54Z304Z7C; L HCl: F7LTH1E20Y
CompTox Dashboard (EPA)	L: DTXSID6041056
- InChI: InChI=1S/C6H14N4O2/c7-4(5(11)12)2-1-3-10-6(8)9/h4H,1-3,7H2,(H,11,12)(H4,8,9,10)/t4-/m0/s1 Key: ODKSFYDXXFIFQN-BYPYZUCNSA-N; D/L: Key: ODKSFYDXXFIFQN-UHFFFAOYSA-N; D: Key: ODKSFYDXXFIFQN-SCSAIBSYSA-N
- SMILES: L: C(C[C@@H](C(=O)O)N)CNC(=N)N; D/L: C(CC(C(=O)O)N)CNC(=N)N; D: C(C[C@H](C(=O)O)N)CNC(=N)N; L HCl: [Cl-].NC(CCCNC(N)=[NH2+])C([O-])=O; L Zwitterion: NC(CCCNC(N)=[NH2+])C([O-])=O

Properties
Chemical formula	C_{6}H_{14}N_{4}O_{2}
Molar mass	174.204 g·mol^{−1}
Appearance	White crystals
Odor	Odourless
Melting point	260 °C; 500 °F; 533 K
Boiling point	368 °C (694 °F; 641 K)
Solubility in water	14.87 g/100 mL (20 °C)
Solubility	slightly soluble in ethanol insoluble in ethyl ether
log P	−1.652
Acidity (pK_{a})	2.18 (carboxyl), 9.09 (amino), 13.8 (guanidino)

Thermochemistry
Heat capacity (C)	232.8 J K^{−1} mol^{−1} (at 23.7 °C)
Std molar entropy (S^{⦵}_{298})	250.6 J K^{−1} mol^{−1}
Std enthalpy of formation (Δ_{f}H^{⦵}_{298})	−624.9–−622.3 kJ mol^{−1}
Std enthalpy of combustion (Δ_{c}H^{⦵}_{298})	−3.7396–−3.7370 MJ mol^{−1}

Pharmacology
ATC code	B05XB01 (WHO) S

Hazards
- GHS labelling
Pictograms	(GHS07: Exclamation mark)
Signal word	Warning
Hazard statements	H319
Precautionary statements	P305+P351+P338
- Lethal dose or concentration (LD, LC)
LD_{50} (median dose)	5110 mg/kg (rat, oral)
Safety data sheet (SDS)	L-Arginine

Related compounds
Related alkanoic acids	N-Methyl-D-aspartic acid; beta-Methylamino-L-alanine; Guanidinopropionic acid; Theanine; Pantothenic acid
Related compounds	Panthenol

Supplementary data page
- Arginine (data page)
- Except where otherwise noted, data are given for materials in their standard state (at 25 °C [77 °F], 100 kPa). Infobox references

Arginine is the amino acid with the formula (H_{2}N)(HN)CN(H)(CH_{2})_{3}CH(NH_{2})CO_{2}H. The molecule features a guanidino group appended to a standard amino acid framework. At physiological pH, the carboxylic acid is deprotonated (−CO_{2}^{−}) and both the amino and guanidino groups are protonated, resulting in a cation. Only the L-arginine (symbol Arg or R) enantiomer is found naturally. Arg residues are common components of proteins. It is encoded by the codons CGU, CGC, CGA, CGG, AGA, and AGG. The guanidine group in arginine is the precursor for the biosynthesis of nitric oxide. Like all amino acids, it is a white, water-soluble solid.

The one-letter symbol R was assigned to arginine for its phonetic similarity in English.

== History ==
Arginine was first isolated in 1886 from yellow lupin seedlings by the German chemist Ernst Schulze and his assistant Ernst Steiger. He named it from the Greek árgyros (ἄργυρος) meaning "silver" due to the silver-white appearance of arginine nitrate crystals. In 1897, Schulze and Ernst Winterstein (1865–1949) determined the structure of arginine. Schulze and Winterstein synthesized arginine from ornithine and cyanamide in 1899, but some doubts about arginine's structure lingered until Sørensen's synthesis of 1910.

== Sources ==
=== Production ===
It is traditionally obtained by hydrolysis of various sources of protein, such as gelatin. It is obtained commercially by fermentation. In this way, 25-35 g/liter can be produced, using glucose as a carbon source.

=== Dietary sources ===
Arginine is classified as a semiessential or conditionally essential amino acid, depending on the developmental stage and health status of the individual. Preterm infants are unable to synthesize arginine internally, making the amino acid nutritionally essential for them. Most healthy people do not need to supplement with arginine because it is a component of all protein-containing foods and can be synthesized in the body from glutamine via citrulline. Additional, dietary arginine is necessary for otherwise healthy individuals temporarily under physiological stress, for example during recovery from burns, injury or sepsis, or if either of the major sites of arginine biosynthesis, the small intestine and kidneys, have reduced function, because the small bowel does the first step of the synthesizing process and the kidneys do the second.

Arginine is an essential amino acid for birds, as they do not have a urea cycle. For some carnivores, for example cats, dogs and ferrets, arginine is essential, because after a meal, their highly efficient protein catabolism produces large quantities of ammonia which need to be processed through the urea cycle, and if not enough arginine is present, the resulting ammonia toxicity can be lethal. This is not a problem in practice, because meat contains sufficient arginine to avoid this situation.

Animal sources of arginine include meat, dairy products, and eggs, and plant sources include seeds of all types, for example grains, beans, and nuts.

=== Biosynthesis ===
Arginine is produced in organisms via de novo synthesis from glutamine, which has a simpler chemical structure. Arginine is also generated as an intermediate within the urea cycle but is consumed there to the same extent (i.e. there is no net production). In the urea cycle, the transient formation of arginine is a necessary step in the production and excretion of urea.

==== De Novo synthesis ====
The de novo biosynthesis of arginine in humans begins with glutamine. This compound is deaminated to glutamic acid and subsequently converted to glutamate-5-semialdehyde. Transamination of a second glutamic acid molecule produces ornithine, which enters the urea cycle.

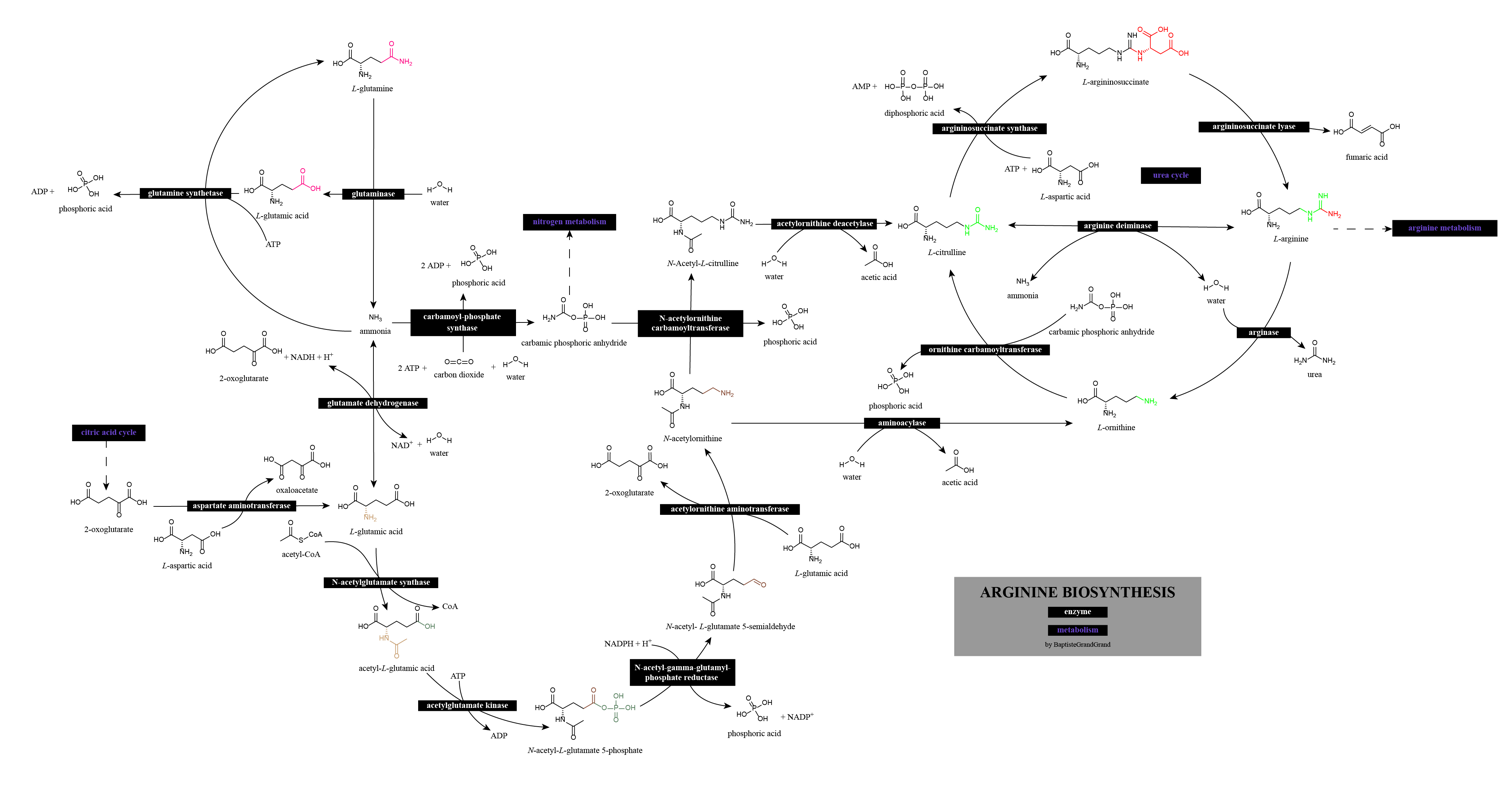
Arginine biosynthesis

In the human body, the epithelial cells of the small intestine produce citrulline, primarily from glutamine and glutamate, which is secreted into the bloodstream which carries it to the proximal tubule cells of the kidney, which extract the citrulline and convert it to arginine, which is returned to the blood. This means that impaired small bowel or renal function can reduce arginine synthesis and thus create a dietary requirement for arginine. For such a person, arginine would become "essential".

Synthesis of arginine from citrulline also occurs at a low level in many other cells, and cellular capacity for arginine synthesis can be markedly increased under circumstances that increase the production of inducible nitric oxide synthase (NOS). This allows citrulline, a byproduct of the NOS-catalyzed production of nitric oxide, to be recycled to arginine in a pathway known as the citrulline to nitric oxide (citrulline-NO) or arginine-citrulline pathway. This is demonstrated by the fact that, in many cell types, nitric oxide synthesis can be supported to some extent by citrulline, and not just by arginine. This recycling is not quantitative, however, because citrulline accumulates in nitric oxide producing cells along with nitrate and nitrite, the stable end-products of nitric oxide breakdown.

In bacteria, biosynthesis proceeds via acetylation intermediates. Glutamate is acetylated to N-acetylglutamate and subsequently converted to N-acetylornithine via N-acetylglutamylphosphate and N-acetylglutamate semialdehyde. Removal of the acetyl group yields ornithine, which enters the urea cycle. Deacetylation can occur either through simple hydrolysis (via acetylornithinase) or by transfer of the acetyl group to glutamic acid with regeneration of N-acetylglutamate. Acetylation presumably serves to separate the biosynthetic pathways of arginine and proline, as the non-acetylated glutamate-5-semialdehyde readily cyclizes to pyrroline-5-carboxylic acid.

The biosynthetic pathway to ornithine as a precursor of arginine via N-acetylglutamate with recovery of the acetyl group occurs not only in many bacteria but also in plants and fungis, but not in animals. Arginine is subsequently formed from ornithine via the urea cycle.

==== Urea cycle ====
In the urea cycle, ornithine is converted to citrulline, then to arginine, and finally (through cleavage of urea) back to ornithine. The cycle is necessary because direct conversion of ammonia into urea is not possible under physiological conditions.

Carbamoyl phosphate is formed from ammonia and carbon dioxide and enters the cycle. The carbon and one nitrogen atom are incorporated into urea, while the second nitrogen atom is derived from aspartate. Urea is produced in the liver and transported via the bloodstream to the kidney, where it is excreted in the urine. In urine, urea accounts for approximately 90% of the nitrogen content. In the mitochondrion, ornithine is converted with carbamoyl phosphate to citrulline by ornithine transcarbamoylase. The subsequent reactions occur in the cytosol. Citrulline and aspartic acid are converted by argininosuccinate synthase to argininosuccinate. This compound is then converted to arginine by argininosuccinate lyase, releasing fumarate. Arginine can subsequently be converted back to ornithine by arginase with the release of urea, thereby completing the cycle.

Nitrogen excretion in the form of urea occurs in mammals, whereas fish typically excrete ammonium directly, and reptiles and birds excrete uric acid.

== Function ==
Arginine plays an important role in cell division, wound healing, removing ammonia from the body, immune function, and the release of hormones. It is a precursor for the synthesis of nitric oxide (NO), making it important in the regulation of blood pressure. Arginine is necessary for T-cells to function in the body, and can lead to their deregulation if depleted.

=== Proteins ===
Arginine's side chain is amphipathic, because at physiological pH it contains a positively charged guanidinium group, which is highly polar, at the end of a hydrophobic aliphatic hydrocarbon chain. Because globular proteins have hydrophobic interiors and hydrophilic surfaces, arginine is typically found on the outside of the protein, where the hydrophilic head group can interact with the polar environment, for example taking part in hydrogen bonding and salt bridges. For this reason, it is frequently found at the interface between two proteins. The aliphatic part of the side chain sometimes remains below the surface of the protein.

Arginine residues in proteins can be deiminated by PAD enzymes to form citrulline, in a post-translational modification process called citrullination. This is important in fetal development, is part of the normal immune process, as well as the control of gene expression, but is also significant in autoimmune diseases. Another post-translational modification of arginine involves methylation by protein methyltransferases.

=== Agmatine and polyamines ===
The decarboxylation of arginine by arginine decarboxylase produces agmatine, which functions as a neuromodulator and serves as an alternative precursor for the synthesis of polyamines. In mammals, these are essential for various post-translational modifications, including those involving histones. Agmatine can be converted into N-carbamoylputrescine and subsequently into putrescine. Alternatively, putrescine is formed by decarboxylation of ornithine. Putrescine can then be converted into spermidine and subsequently into spermine, the other polyamines. The relative contributions of agmatine and ornithine to putrescine formation are not yet fully understood.

Various plant alkaloids, such as nicotine and the tropane alkaloids cocaine, hyoscyamine, and scopolamine, are synthesized in plants from putrescine. This compound is usually derived from ornithine but can also originate from arginine. Likewise, homospermidine, a precursor of the pyrrolizidine alkaloids (e.g., senecionin), is formed from arginine or ornithine via putrescine.

Both arginine and ornithine can be converted into putrescine in bacteria. The pathway utilized depends on whether arginine is converted into ornithine or metabolized via alternative routes, as well as on its availability. Prokaryotes possessing arginine decarboxylase include enterobacteria, mycobacteria, and representatives of Aeromonas and Pseudomonas.

=== Precursor of nitric oxide ===
L-Arginine is the sole precursor of nitric oxide in humans and many other animals (NO), one of the smallest messenger substances in the human body. Through the action of NO synthases (nitric oxide synthases), L-arginine is converted into the endothelium-derived relaxing factor (EDRF), which has been identified as NO. Physiologically, EDRF induces vasodilation by diffusing NO into the vascular smooth muscle layer. There, it activates soluble guanylate cyclase, leading to relaxation of the smooth muscle and a reduction in vascular tone. Studies show that arginine can significantly reduce elevated blood pressure through this vasodilatory effect.

=== Precursor of others ===
Arginine is also a precursor for urea, ornithine, and agmatine; is necessary for the synthesis of creatine; and can also be used for the synthesis of polyamines (mainly through ornithine and to a lesser degree through agmatine, citrulline, and glutamate). The presence of asymmetric dimethylarginine (ADMA), a close relative, inhibits the nitric oxide reaction; therefore, ADMA is considered a marker for vascular disease, just as L-arginine is considered a sign of a healthy endothelium.

In mammals, arginine can be converted into proline via glutamate-5-semialdehyde and pyrroline-5-carboxylic acid. The conversion of arginine into other amino acids also occurs in bacteria; for example, species of the genus Bacillus can convert arginine into proline or glutamic acid via ornithine.

The Solanum alkaloids (from the plant family Solanaceae) and Veratrum alkaloids (genus Veratrum) are synthesized from cholesterol via biosynthesis. Nitrogen is introduced from arginine through transamination.

Vargulin is a luciferine formed by shellfish from arginine, tryptophan, and isoleucine, and is used to produce bioluminescence in the form of blue light. During bioluminescence, the reaction of a luciferin with a luciferase generates an energetically excited molecule that emits light. Vargulin is found in the genera Vargula and Cypridina, as well as in certain fish species that consume shellfish and acquire the compound through their diet.

=== Energetic utilization ===
Various bacteria can utilize arginine as an energy source. It is initially converted by arginine deiminase into citrulline, then by ornithine transcarbamylase into ornithine and carbamoyl phosphate. One molecule of adenosine triphosphate can be generated from adenosine diphosphate through the breakdown of carbamoyl phosphate by carbamate kinase to ammonium hydrogen carbonate. Several prokaryotes use arginine as their sole energy source, including representatives of Mycoplasma, Bacillus, Spirochaeta, members of Halobacteria within the Archaea, as well as Streptococcus faecalis and Pseudomonas aeruginosa. However, this metabolic pathway also occurs in representatives of Aeromonas and Spiroplasma, other Pseudomonas species, as well as Clostridia and Cyanobacteria. Many bacteria utilizing this pathway excrete large amounts of ornithine, indicating that only guanidine is metabolized. In some bacteria, arginine can also serve as the sole nitrogen source, for example in Aeromonas formicans or Bacillus licheniformis. Another degradation pathway of arginine, observed for example in various Pseudomonas species, involves arginine succinyltransferase. In this pathway, the carbon atom of the arginine guanidino group is converted into carbon dioxide, and NADH is produced.

=== Nitrogen reserve ===
Cyanophycin is a polymer consisting of a backbone of aspartic acid units with arginine side chains. It is synthesized by cyanobacteria and other bacteria either directly from arginine and aspartic acid or from the corresponding dipeptide, β-aspartylarginine, and serves as a nitrogen storage compound.

In plants, particularly trees, arginine also plays a role in nitrogen storage. Under conditions of increased nitrogen availability, arginine—having the highest nitrogen content among amino acids—is preferentially synthesized and stored either as a free amino acid or within proteins. Trees also possess transport proteins for the uptake of arginine from the soil, and in conifers it represents a preferred nitrogen source. Various studies have shown that the xylem of trees contains high concentrations of free arginine compared to other amino acids, for example in citrus plants. Arginine is mobilized from arginine-containing storage proteins when needed. It also serves as a nitrogen source during germination, as demonstrated in studies on maritime pine.

== Structure ==
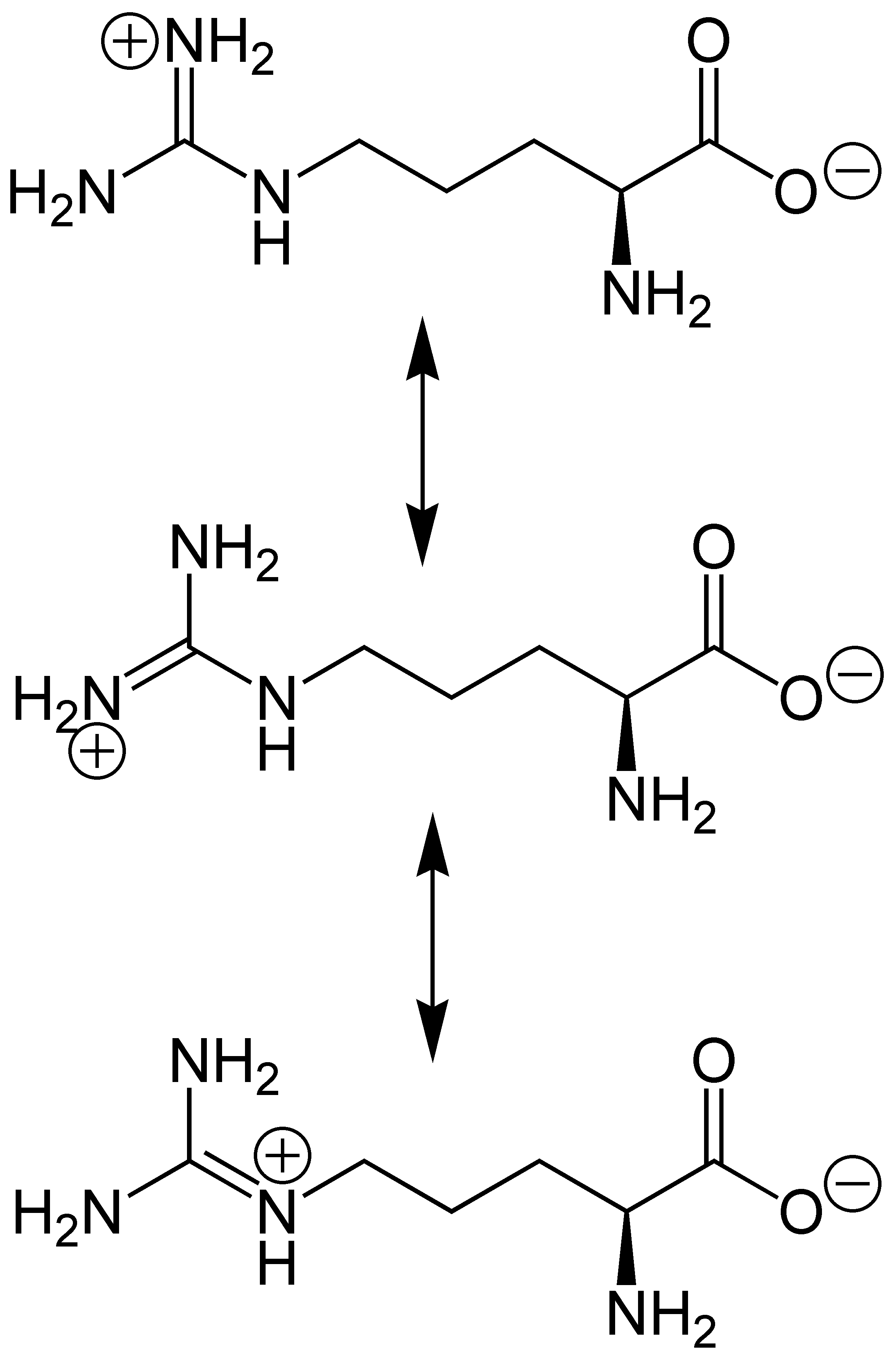
Delocalization of charge in guanidinium group of l-Arginine

The amino acid side-chain of arginine consists of a 3-carbon aliphatic straight chain, the distal end of which is capped by a guanidinium group, which has a pK_{a} of 13.8, and is therefore always protonated and positively charged at physiological pH. Because of the conjugation between the double bond and the nitrogen lone pairs, the positive charge is delocalized, enabling the formation of multiple hydrogen bonds.

== Research ==
=== Growth hormone ===
Intravenously administered arginine is used in growth hormone stimulation tests because it stimulates the secretion of growth hormone. A review of clinical trials concluded that oral arginine increases growth hormone, but decreases growth hormone secretion, which is normally associated with exercising. However, a more recent trial reported that although oral arginine increased plasma levels of L-arginine it did not cause an increase in growth hormone.

=== Herpes simplex virus (cold sores) ===
Research from 1964 into amino acid requirements of herpes simplex virus in human cells indicated that "...the lack of arginine or histidine, and possibly the presence of lysine, would interfere markedly with virus synthesis", but concludes that "no ready explanation is available for any of these observations".

Further reviews conclude that "lysine's efficacy for herpes labialis may lie more in prevention than treatment." and that "the use of lysine for decreasing the severity or duration of outbreaks" is not supported, while further research is needed. A 2017 study concludes that "clinicians could consider advising patients that there is a theoretical role of lysine supplementation in the prevention of herpes simplex sores but the research evidence is insufficient to back this. Patients with cardiovascular or gallbladder disease should be cautioned and warned of the theoretical risks."

=== High blood pressure ===
A meta-analysis showed that L-arginine reduces blood pressure with pooled estimates of 5.4 mmHg for systolic blood pressure and 2.7 mmHg for diastolic blood pressure.

Supplementation with l-arginine reduces diastolic blood pressure and lengthens pregnancy for women with gestational hypertension, including women with high blood pressure as part of pre-eclampsia. It did not lower systolic blood pressure or improve weight at birth.

=== Schizophrenia ===
Both liquid chromatography and liquid chromatography/mass spectrometric assays have found that brain tissue of deceased people with schizophrenia shows altered arginine metabolism. Assays also confirmed significantly reduced levels of γ-aminobutyric acid (GABA), but increased agmatine concentration and glutamate/GABA ratio in the schizophrenia cases. Regression analysis indicated positive correlations between arginase activity and the age of disease onset and between L-ornithine level and the duration of illness. Moreover, cluster analyses revealed that L-arginine and its main metabolites L-citrulline, L-ornithine and agmatine formed distinct groups, which were altered in the schizophrenia group. Despite this, the biological basis of schizophrenia is still poorly understood, a number of factors, such as dopamine hyperfunction, glutamatergic hypofunction, GABAergic deficits, cholinergic system dysfunction, stress vulnerability and neurodevelopmental disruption, have been linked to the aetiology and/or pathophysiology of the disease.

=== Raynaud's phenomenon ===
Oral L-arginine has been shown to reverse digital necrosis in Raynaud syndrome.

== Safety and potential drug interactions ==
L-arginine is recognized as safe (GRAS-status) at intakes of up to 20 grams per day. L-arginine is found in many foods, such as fish, poultry, and dairy products, and is used as a dietary supplement. It may interact with various prescription drugs and herbal supplements.

== See also ==
- Arginine glutamate
- AAKG
- Canavanine and canaline are toxic analogs of arginine and ornithine.

== Sources ==
- Griffiths JR, Unwin RD (2016). Analysis of Protein Post-Translational Modifications by Mass Spectrometry. John Wiley & Sons. ISBN 978-1-119-25088-3.
