= Β-Ureidoisobutyric acid =

β-Ureidoisobutyric acid
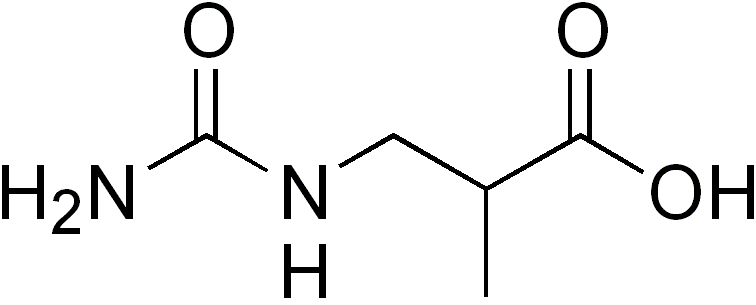
- Skeletal formula of beta-ureidoisobutyric acid

Names
- Preferred IUPAC name 3-(Carbamoylamino)-2-methylpropanoic acid

Identifiers
CAS Number	2905-86-4
3D model (JSmol)	Interactive image
Beilstein Reference	1768736
ChEBI	CHEBI:1670
ChemSpider	141172
ECHA InfoCard	100.236.960
KEGG	C05100
MeSH	beta-ureidoisobutyric+acid
PubChem CID	160663; 55289370 R
CompTox Dashboard (EPA)	DTXSID80863054
- InChI: InChI=1S/C5H10N2O3/c1-3(4(8)9)2-7-5(6)10/h3H,2H2,1H3,(H,8,9)(H3,6,7,10) Key: PHENTZNALBMCQD-UHFFFAOYSA-N
- SMILES: CC(CNC(N)=O)C(O)=O

Properties
Chemical formula	C_{5}H_{10}N_{2}O_{3}
Molar mass	146.146 g·mol^{−1}

Related compounds
Related alkanoic acids	3-Ureidopropionic acid; Carbamoyl aspartic acid; N-Acetylaspartic acid
Related compounds	Biuret; Bromisoval; Carbromal
- Except where otherwise noted, data are given for materials in their standard state (at 25 °C [77 °F], 100 kPa). verify (what is ?) Infobox references

β-Ureidoisobutyric acid is an intermediate in the catabolism of thymine.
