= N-Propyl-L-arginine =

N-Propyl-l-arginine
- Stereo, skeletal formula of N-propyl-L-arginine (S)

Names
- Other names 2-Amino-5-[(N'-propylcarbamimidoyl)amino]pentanoic acid

Identifiers
CAS Number	137361-05-8
3D model (JSmol)	Interactive image
ChEMBL	ChEMBL126713; ChEMBL107528
ChemSpider	4234; 394346 S
PubChem CID	4387; 17753781 R; 447180 S
UNII	G7F9U4R2AC
CompTox Dashboard (EPA)	DTXSID30332245
- InChI: InChI=1S/C9H20N4O2/c1-2-5-12-9(11)13-6-3-4-7(10)8(14)15/h7H,2-6,10H2,1H3,(H,14,15)(H3,11,12,13) Key: AOMXURITGZJPKB-UHFFFAOYSA-N
- SMILES: CCCNC(=N)NCCCC(N)C(O)=O

Properties
Chemical formula	C_{9}H_{20}N_{4}O_{2}
Molar mass	216.285 g·mol^{−1}
log P	0.389
Acidity (pK_{a})	2.512
Basicity (pK_{b})	11.485

Related compounds
Related alkanoic acids	Methylarginine; Asymmetric dimethylarginine
Related compounds	Acecarbromal
- Except where otherwise noted, data are given for materials in their standard state (at 25 °C [77 °F], 100 kPa). verify (what is ?) Infobox references

N-Propyl-l-arginine, or more properly N^{G}-propyl-l-arginine (NPA), is a selective inhibitor of neuronal nitric oxide synthase (nNOS).
