= Arginine (data page) =

Chemical data page

The complete data for Arginine
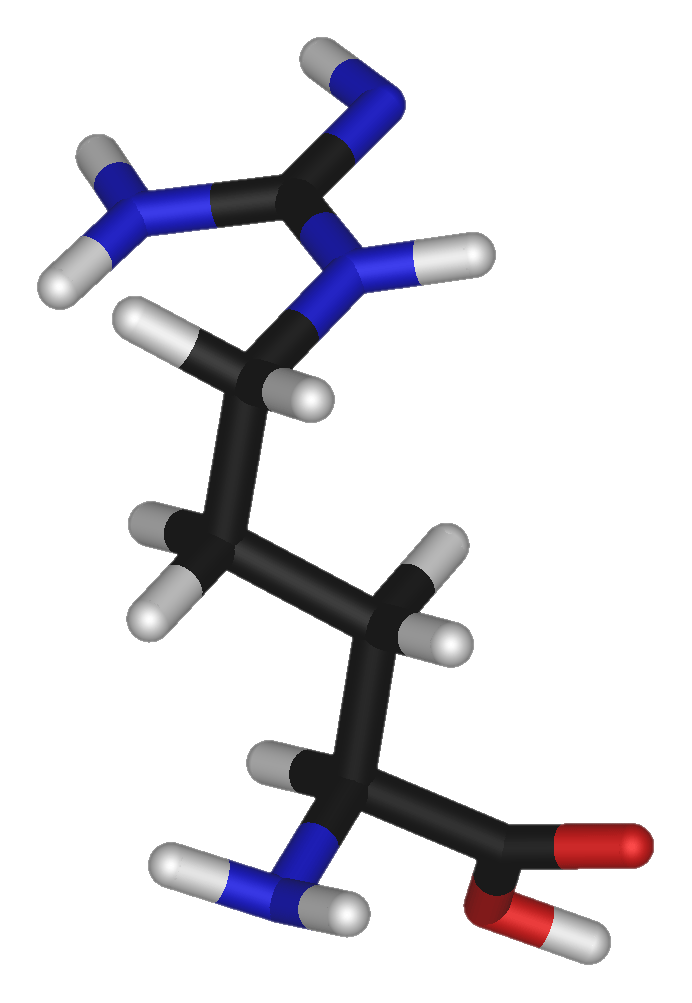
General information
Chemical formula: C_{6}H_{14}N_{4}O_{2}
Molar mass: 174.2 g·mol^{−1}
Systematic name:
2-amino-5-(diaminomethylidene amino)pentanoic acid
Abbreviations: R, Arg
Synonyms:
2-amino-5-guanidinopentanoic acid
2-amino-5-guanidinovaleric acid
AIDS{-}121865
AIDS{-}159840
Argamine
Arginin
Argivene
CHEBI:29016
CHEMBANK2983
Detoxargin
Harg
Levargin
Minophagen A
R-Gene
Database data
SMILES: NC(=N)NCCCC(N)C(=O)O
InChI=1/C6H14N4O2/c7-4(5(11)12)2-1-3-10-6(8)9/h4H,1-3,7H2,(H,11,12)(H4,8,9,10)/f/h11H,8-9H2

| ATC: N/A | CAS: 157-06-2 (D), 74-79-3 (L) | DrugBank: N/A | EINECS: 205-866-5 (D) ^{a}, 200-811-1 (L) ^{a} | PubChem: 71070 (D) ^{a}, 6322 (L) ^{a} |

Physical properties

| Structure | Crystal data | Spectral data: UV-Vis / IR / NMR / MS |

| Phase behavior | Solid properties ρ_{solid}: 1.1 g.cm^{−3} T_{m}: 244 °C | Liquid properties | Gas properties |

Hazard properties

| MSDS N/A | Main hazards: N/A | NFPA 704 | Flash point: N/A | RTECS number: N/A |

Chemical properties

| XLogP: -3.878 | pI: 10.76 | pK_{a}: 2.03; 9.00; 12.10 | Tautomers: 2 | Hydrogen bond: donor - 4; acceptor - 6 |

Pharmacological properties

This box:
- Except where noted otherwise, data relate to Standard temperature and pressure.
- Reliability of data general note.
