= N-Acetylglutamic acid =

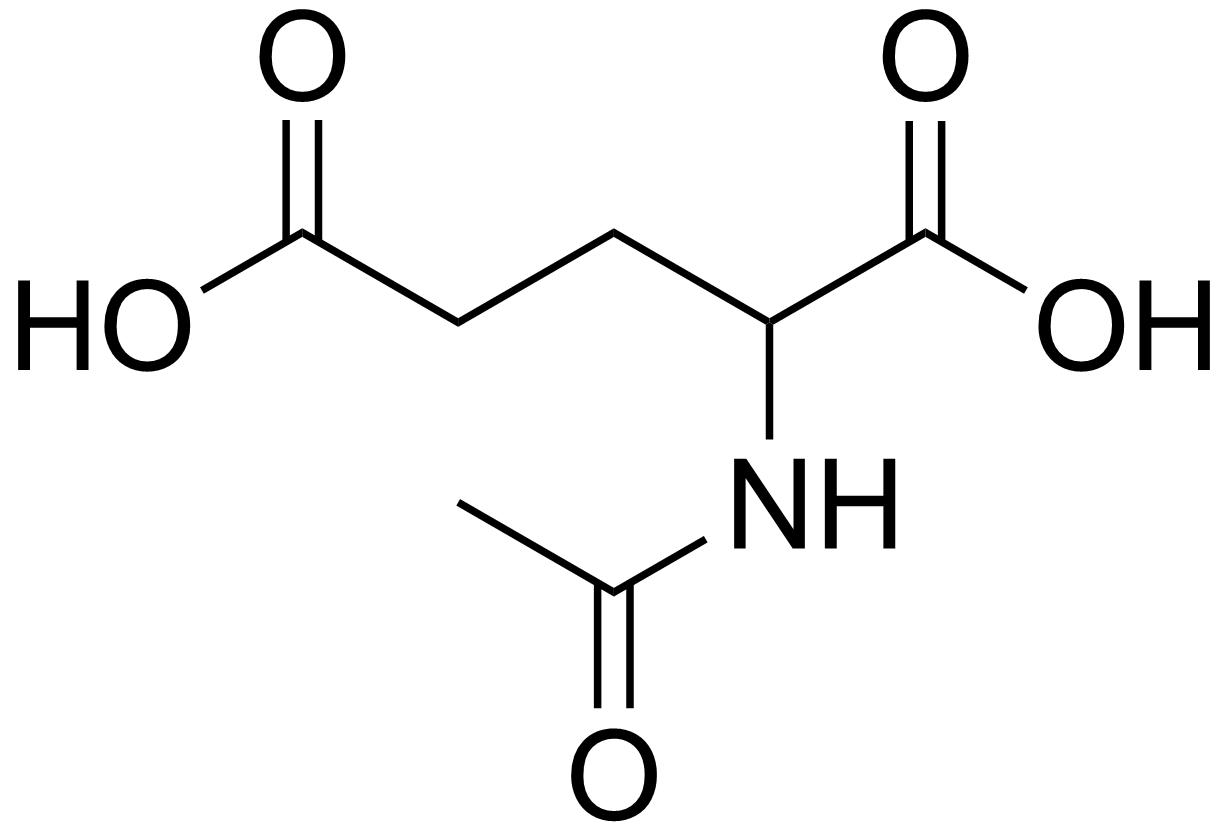
- Skeletal formula of N-acetylglutamic acid

Names
- IUPAC name 2-Acetamidopentanedioic acid
- Other names Acetylglutamic acid

Identifiers
CAS Number	5817-08-3; 19146-55-5 R; 1188-37-0 S
3D model (JSmol)	Interactive image
Abbreviations	N-Acetyl-Glu; NAcGlu; Ac-Glu-OH
Beilstein Reference	1727473 S
ChEBI	CHEBI:17533
ChemSpider	180; 1272049 R; 64077 S
DrugBank	DB04075
ECHA InfoCard	100.024.899
EC Number	227-388-6
KEGG	C00624
MeSH	N-acetylglutamate
PubChem CID	185; 1560015 R; 70914 S
RTECS number	LZ9725000 S
UNII	MA61H539YZ S
CompTox Dashboard (EPA)	DTXSID00859595
- InChI: InChI=1S/C7H11NO5/c1-4(9)8-5(7(12)13)2-3-6(10)11/h5H,2-3H2,1H3,(H,8,9)(H,10,11)(H,12,13) Key: RFMMMVDNIPUKGG-UHFFFAOYSA-N; InChI=1S/C7H11NO5/c1-4(9)8-5(7(12)13)2-3-6(10)11/h5H,2-3H2,1H3,(H,8,9)(H,10,11)(H,12,13)/t5-/m1/s1 Key: RFMMMVDNIPUKGG-RXMQYKEDSA-N; InChI=1S/C7H11NO5/c1-4(9)8-5(7(12)13)2-3-6(10)11/h5H,2-3H2,1H3,(H,8,9)(H,10,11)(H,12,13)/t5-/m0/s1 Key: RFMMMVDNIPUKGG-YFKPBYRVSA-N
- SMILES: CC(=O)NC(CCC(=O)O)C(=O)O

Properties
Chemical formula	C_{7}H_{11}NO_{5}
Molar mass	189.167 g·mol^{−1}
Appearance	White crystals
Density	1 g mL^{−1}
Melting point	191 to 194 °C (376 to 381 °F; 464 to 467 K)
Solubility in water	36 g L^{−1}

Hazards
- Lethal dose or concentration (LD, LC)
LD_{50} (median dose)	>7 g kg^{−1} (oral, rat)

Related compounds
Related alkanoic acids	N-Acetylaspartic acid; Aceglutamide; Citrulline; Pivagabine
Related compounds	Bromisoval; Carbromal
- Except where otherwise noted, data are given for materials in their standard state (at 25 °C [77 °F], 100 kPa). verify (what is ?) Infobox references

N-Acetylglutamic acid (also referred to as N-acetylglutamate, abbreviated NAG, chemical formula C_{7}H_{11}NO_{5}) is biosynthesized from glutamate and acetylornithine by ornithine acetyltransferase, and from glutamic acid and acetyl-CoA by the enzyme N-acetylglutamate synthase. The reverse reaction, hydrolysis of the acetyl group, is catalyzed by a specific hydrolase. It is the first intermediate involved in the biosynthesis of arginine in prokaryotes and simple eukaryotes and a regulator in the process known as the urea cycle that converts toxic ammonia to urea for excretion from the body in vertebrates.

== Discovery ==
N-Acetylglutamic acid is an extracellular metabolite isolated from the prokaryote Rhizobium leguminosarum that was characterized using many structure determination techniques such as proton nuclear magnetic resonance (^{1}H NMR) spectroscopy, Fourier-transform infrared spectroscopy, and gas chromatography-mass spectrometry.

In Rhizobium, extracellular build-up of N-acetylglutamic acid is due to metabolism involving nod factor genes on a symbiotic plasmid. When the nod factors are mutated, less N-acetylglutamic acid is produced.

== Biosynthesis ==
=== Prokaryotes and simple eukaryotes ===
In prokaryotes and simple eukaryotes, N-acetylglutamic acid can be produced by N-acetylglutamate synthase (NAGS) or ornithine acetyltransferase (OAT).

==== Ornithine acetyltransferase (OAT) synthesis ====
OAT synthesizes N-acetylglutamic acid from glutamate and acetylornithine and is the method of choice for production in prokaryotes that have the ability to synthesize the compound ornithine.

==== N-Acetylglutamate synthase (NAGS) synthesis ====
N-Acetylglutamate synthase is an enzyme that serves as a replenisher of N-acetylglutamic acid to supplement any N-acetylglutamic acid lost by the cell through mitosis or degradation. NAGS synthesizes N-acetylglutamic acid by catalyzing the addition of an acetyl group from acetyl-coenzyme A to glutamate. In prokaryotes with non-cyclic ornithine production, NAGS is the sole method of N-acetylglutamic acid synthesis and is inhibited by arginine. Acetylation of glutamate is thought to prevent glutamate from being used by proline biosynthesis.

=== Vertebrates ===
In contrast to prokaryotes, NAGS in mammals is enhanced by arginine, along with protamines. It is inhibited by N-acetylglutamic acid and its analogues (other N-acetylated compounds).

The brain also contains N-acetylglutamic acid at trace amounts, however no expression of NAGS is found. This suggests that N-acetylglutamic acid is produced by another enzyme in the brain that is yet to be determined.

== Biological roles ==
=== Vertebrates and mammals ===
In vertebrae and mammals, N-acetylglutamic acid is the allosteric activator molecule to mitochondrial carbamyl phosphate synthetase I (CPSI) which is the first enzyme in the urea cycle. It triggers the production of the first urea cycle intermediate, carbamyl phosphate. CPSI is inactive when N-acetylglutamic acid is not present. In the liver and small intestines, N-acetylglutamic acid-dependent CPSI produces citrulline, the second intermediate in the urea cycle. Liver cell distribution of N-acetylglutamic acid is highest in the mitochondria at 56% of total N-acetylglutamic acid availability, 24% in the nucleus, and the remaining 20% in the cytosol. Aminoacylase I in liver and kidney cells degrades N-acetylglutamic acid to glutamate and acetate. In contrast, N-acetylglutamic acid is not the allosteric cofactor to carbamyl phosphate synthetase found in the cytoplasm, which is involved in pyrimidine synthesis.

N-acetylglutamic acid concentrations increase when protein consumption increases due to the accumulation of ammonia that must be secreted through the urea cycle, which supports the role of N-acetylglutamic acid as the cofactor for CPSI. Furthermore, N-acetylglutamic acid can be found in many commonly consumed foods such as soy, corn, and coffee, with cocoa powder containing a notably high concentration.

Deficiency in N-acetylglutamic acid in humans is an autosomal recessive disorder that results in blockage of urea production which ultimately increases the concentration of ammonia in the blood (hyperammonemia). Deficiency can be caused by defects in the NAGS coding gene or by deficiencies in the precursors essential for synthesis.

=== Bacteria ===
N-Acetylglutamic acid is the second intermediate in the arginine production pathway in Escherichia coli and is produced via NAGS. In this pathway, N-acetylglutamic acid kinase (NAGK) catalyzes the phosphorylation of the gamma (third) carboxyl group of N-acetylglutamic acid using the phosphate produced by hydrolysis of adenosine triphosphate (ATP).

=== White clover seedling roots ===
Rhizobium can form a symbiotic relationship with white clover seedling roots and form colonies. The extracellular N-acetylglutamic acid produced by these bacteria have three morphological effects on the white clover seedling roots: branching of root hairs, swelling of root tips, and increase in the number of cell divisions in undifferentiated cells found on the outer-most cell layer of the root. This suggests that N-acetylglutamic acid is involved in the stimulation of mitosis. The same effects were observed on the strawberry clover, but not in legumes. The effects of N-acetylglutamic acid on the clover species were more potent than the effects from glutamine, glutamate, arginine, or ammonia.

== Structure ==
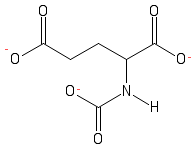
N-Acetylglutamic acid at physiological pH (7.4)

N-Acetylglutamic acid is composed of two carboxylic acid groups and an amide group protruding from the second carbon. The structure of N-acetylglutamic acid at physiological pH (7.4) has all carboxyl groups deprotonated.

=== Proton NMR spectroscopy ===
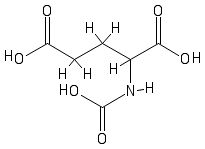
N-acetylglutamic acid with protons shown

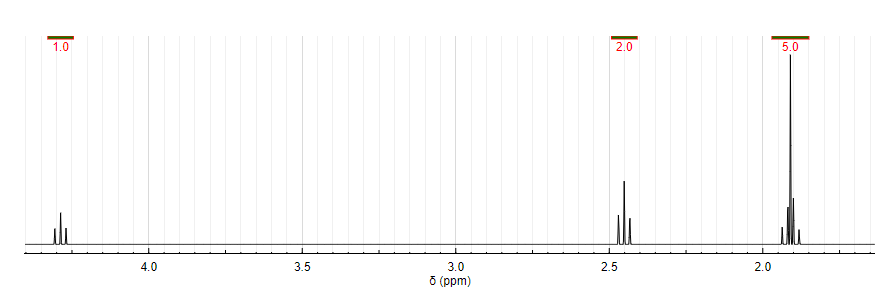
Proton NMR spectrum

The molecular structure of N-acetylglutamic acid was determined using proton NMR spectroscopy. Proton NMR reveals the presence and functional group location of protons based on chemical shifts recorded on the spectrum.

=== ^{13}C NMR spectroscopy ===
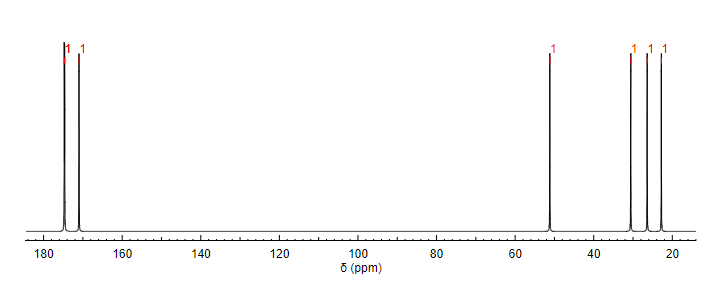
^{13}C NMR Spectrum

Like proton NMR, carbon-13 (^{13}C) NMR spectroscopy is a method used in molecular structure determination. ^{13}C NMR reveals the types of carbons present in a molecule based on chemical shifts that correspond to certain functional groups. N-Acetylglutamic acid exhibits carbonyl carbons most distinctly due to the three carbonyl-containing substituents.
