= Acecarbromal =

- Seletal formula of acebromal

Names
- Preferred IUPAC name N-(Acetylcarbamoyl)-2-bromo-2-ethylbutanamide
- Other names 1-Acetyl-3-(2-bromo-2-ethylbutyryl)urea

Identifiers
CAS Number	77-66-7
3D model (JSmol)	Interactive image
ChEMBL	ChEMBL2104673
ChemSpider	6244
ECHA InfoCard	100.000.953
EC Number	201-047-1
KEGG	D07059
MeSH	acecarbromal
PubChem CID	6489
UNII	E47C56IGOY
CompTox Dashboard (EPA)	DTXSID9058810
- InChI: InChI=1S/C9H15BrN2O3/c1-4-9(10,5-2)7(14)12-8(15)11-6(3)13/h4-5H2,1-3H3,(H2,11,12,13,14,15) Key: SAZUGELZHZOXHB-UHFFFAOYSA-N
- SMILES: CCC(Br)(CC)C(=O)NC(=O)NC(C)=O

Properties
Chemical formula	C_{9}H_{15}BrN_{2}O_{3}
Molar mass	279.134 g·mol^{−1}

Pharmacology
Routes of administration	Oral
Legal status	In general: ℞ (Prescription only)

Related compounds
Related compounds	Buformin; Methylarginine; Asymmetric dimethylarginine; N-Propyl-L-arginine
- Except where otherwise noted, data are given for materials in their standard state (at 25 °C [77 °F], 100 kPa). Infobox references

Acecarbromal (INN) (brand names Sedamyl, Abasin, Carbased, Paxarel, Sedacetyl, numerous others), also known as acetylcarbromal and acetyladalin, is a hypnotic and sedative drug of the ureide (acylurea) group discovered by Bayer in 1917 that was formerly marketed in the United States and Europe. It is also used in combination with extract of quebracho and vitamin E as a treatment for erectile dysfunction under the brand name Afrodor in Europe. Acecarbromal is structurally related to the barbiturates, which are basically cyclized ureas. Prolonged use is not recommended as it can cause bromine poisoning.

== See also ==
- Apronal
- Bromisoval
- Carbromal
