= Asymmetric dimethylarginine =

- Skeletal formula of asymmetric dimethylarginine (S)

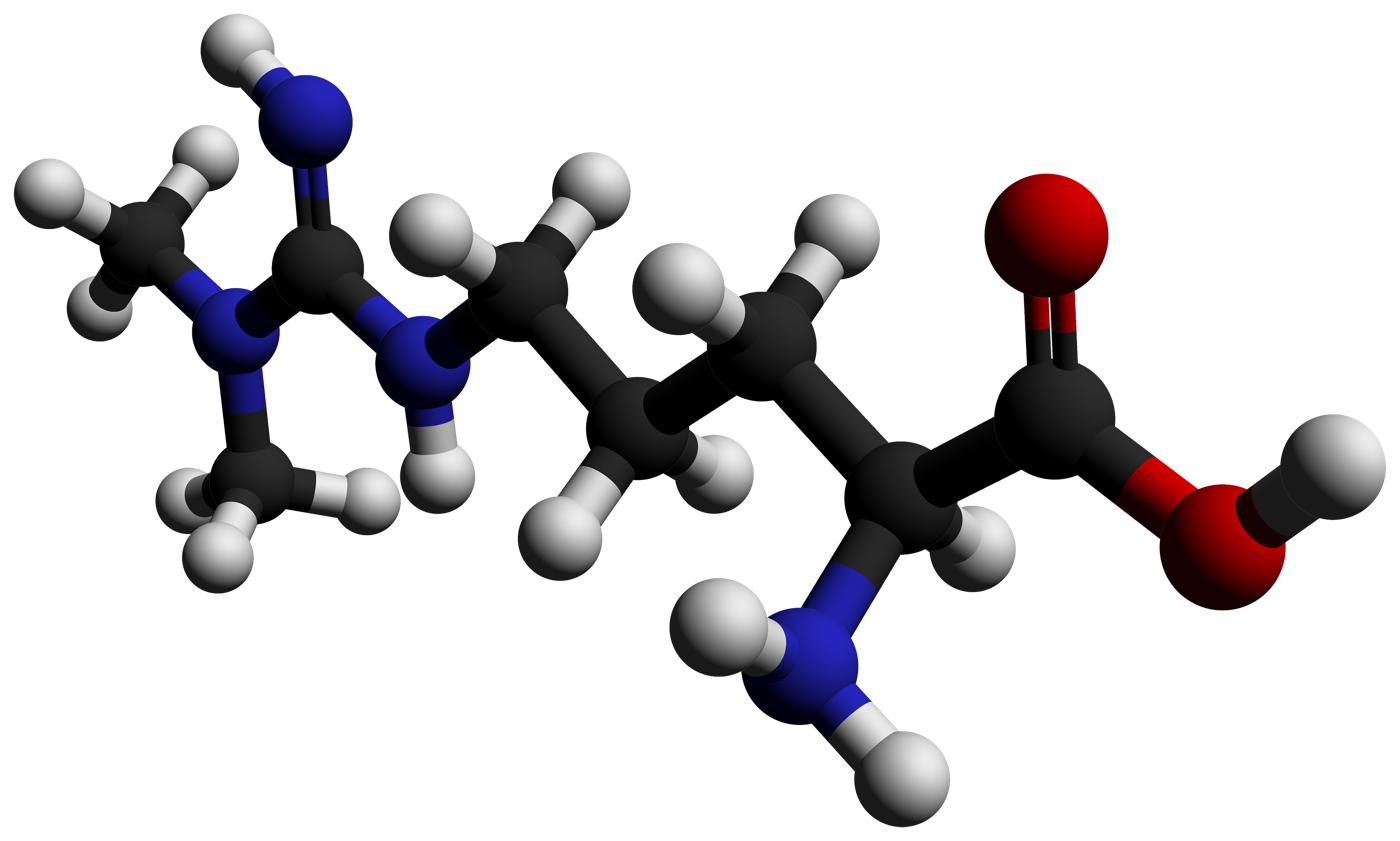

Names
- IUPAC name 2-Amino-5-[[amino(dimethylamino)methylidene]amino]pentanoic acid
- Other names N^{ω},N^{ω}-Dimethylarginine

Identifiers
CAS Number	30315-93-6 S
3D model (JSmol)	Interactive image
Beilstein Reference	2261521 S
ChEBI	CHEBI:17929
ChEMBL	ChEMBL457530
ChemSpider	487; 16743930 R; 110375 S
DrugBank	DB01686
KEGG	C03626
MeSH	N,N-dimethylarginine
PubChem CID	501; 17753937 R; 123831 S
UNII	63CV1GEK3Y
CompTox Dashboard (EPA)	DTXSID401017725 DTXSID6036758, DTXSID401017725
- InChI: InChI=1S/C8H18N4O2/c1-12(2)8(10)11-5-3-4-6(9)7(13)14/h6H,3-5,9H2,1-2H3,(H2,10,11)(H,13,14)/t6-/m0/s1 Key: YDGMGEXADBMOMJ-LURJTMIESA-N
- SMILES: CN(C)C(=NCCCC(C(=O)O)N)N

Properties
Chemical formula	C_{8}H_{18}N_{4}O_{2}
Molar mass	202.258 g·mol^{−1}
log P	−0.716
Acidity (pK_{a})	2.497
Basicity (pK_{b})	11.500

Related compounds
Related alkanoic acids	Methylarginine; N-Propyl-L-arginine
Related compounds	Buformin; Acecarbromal
- Except where otherwise noted, data are given for materials in their standard state (at 25 °C [77 °F], 100 kPa). Infobox references

Asymmetric dimethylarginine (ADMA) is a naturally occurring chemical found in blood plasma. It is a metabolic by-product of continual protein modification processes in the cytoplasm of all human cells consisting of an arginine core with two methyl groups on one of the side-chain nitrogen atoms. It is closely related to L-arginine, a conditionally essential amino acid. ADMA interferes with L-arginine in the production of nitric oxide (NO), a key chemical involved in normal endothelial function and, by extension, cardiovascular health.

== Discovery ==
Patrick Vallance and his co-workers first noted the interference role for asymmetric dimethylarginine in the early 1990s while working in London. Today biochemical and clinical research continues into the role of ADMA in cardiovascular disease, diabetes mellitus, erectile dysfunction and certain forms of kidney disease.

== Synthesis and regulation in the body ==
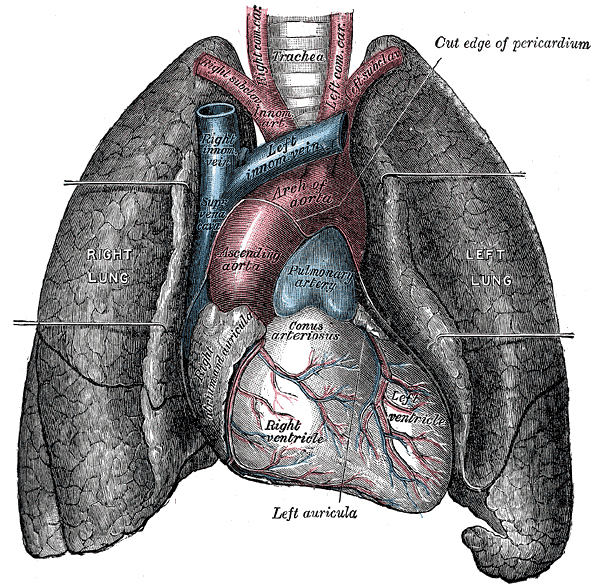
Cardiovascular effects have been linked to ADMA

Asymmetric dimethylarginine is created in protein methylation, a common mechanism of post-translational protein modification. This reaction is catalyzed by an enzyme set called protein arginine N-methyltransferases 1 and 2 (also known as S-adenosylmethionine protein N-methyltransferases I and II). The methyl groups transferred to create ADMA are derived from the methyl group donor S-adenosylmethionine, an intermediate in the metabolism of homocysteine. (Homocysteine is an important blood chemical because it is also a marker of cardiovascular disease). After synthesis, ADMA migrates into the extracellular space and thence into blood plasma. Asymmetric dimethylarginine is measured using high-performance liquid chromatography.

ADMA concentrations are substantially elevated by native or oxidized LDL cholesterol. Thus a spiralling effect occurs with high endothelial LDL levels causing greater ADMA values, which in turn inhibit NO production needed to promote vasodilation. The elimination of ADMA occurs through urine excretion and metabolism by the enzyme dimethylarginine dimethylaminohydrolase (DDAH):

ADMA
H_{2}O
citrulline
+
dimethylamine

The role of homocysteine as a risk factor for cardiovascular disease is suggested to be mediated by homocysteine down-regulating production of DDAH in the body. Polyphenol antioxidants also play a role in down-regulating homocysteine.

== ADMA and suggested lines of therapeutic research ==
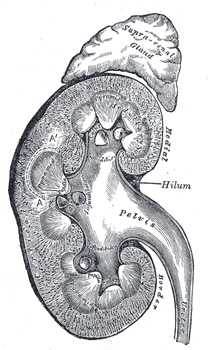
ADMA may play a role in certain forms of kidney disease

With raised levels of ADMA seemingly to be associated with adverse human health consequences for cardiovascular disease, metabolic diseases, and also a wide range of diseases of the elderly, the possible lowering of ADMA levels may have important therapeutic effects. However, it has yet to be established whether ADMA levels can be manipulated and, more important, if this results in useful clinical benefits.

The association of ADMA with abnormalities of lipid regulation suggested that supplements of free fatty acids might manipulate ADMA levels. However, research has failed to show that these have an effect.

ADMA's role has been linked with elevated levels of homocysteine. Whilst approaches at modifying the latter with oral supplements of folic acid were strongly suggested, studies have shown this fails to give any clinical benefit and suggested that B vitamins might instead increase some cardiovascular risks.

Direct alteration of ADMA levels with supplements of L-arginine have been suggested. The hope is that such intervention might not only improve endothelial function but also reduce clinical symptoms of overt cardiovascular disease. However studies show inconsistency in results in a clinical context, and the recent results with manipulating homocysteine levels warrant extreme care with what clinical outcomes might arise from this approach.

Statins, as well as affecting circulating cholesterol levels, also increase nitric oxide levels and so have a direct effect on blood supply to the heart. Elevated levels of ADMA seems to modify this effect and so may have consequences for patients' responsiveness to taking statins.

Repeated administration of d-amphetamine may decrease ADMA in mice.

== See also ==
- Arginine
- Hypertension
- Protein detoxification
- Vasoconstriction
