= Aceglutamide =

- Stereo, skeletal formula of aceglutamide (S)

Names
- Preferred IUPAC name 2-Acetamido-5-amino-5-oxopentanoic acid
- Other names 2-(Acetylamino)-glutaramidic acid α-N-Acetylglutamine; N-Acetylglutamine; N-Acetyl-L-glutamine

Identifiers
CAS Number	5817-09-4 R/S; 161579-61-9 R; 2490-97-3 S
3D model (JSmol)	Interactive image
ChemSpider	23836 R/S; 392045 R; 158492 S
DrugBank	DB04167
ECHA InfoCard	100.017.862
EC Number	219-647-7
KEGG	D07063
MeSH	aceglutamide
PubChem CID	25561 R/S; 444019 R; 182230 S
UNII	01J18G9G97
CompTox Dashboard (EPA)	DTXSID2048959
- InChI: InChI=1S/C7H12N2O4/c1-4(10)9-5(7(12)13)2-3-6(8)11/h5H,2-3H2,1H3,(H2,8,11)(H,9,10)(H,12,13) Key: KSMRODHGGIIXDV-UHFFFAOYSA-N
- SMILES: CC(=O)NC(CCC(N)=O)C(O)=O

Properties
Chemical formula	C_{7}H_{12}N_{2}O_{4}
Molar mass	188.183 g·mol^{−1}
Appearance	White crystals
Melting point	197 °C (387 °F; 470 K)

Related compounds
Related alkanoic acids	N-Acetylaspartic acid; N-Acetylglutamic acid; Citrulline; Pivagabine
Related compounds	Bromisoval; Carbromal
- Except where otherwise noted, data are given for materials in their standard state (at 25 °C [77 °F], 100 kPa). Infobox references

Aceglutamide (brand name Neuramina), or aceglutamide aluminium (brand name Glumal), also known as acetylglutamine, is a psychostimulant, nootropic, and antiulcer agent that is marketed in Spain and Japan. It is an acetylated form of the amino acid L-glutamine, the precursor of glutamate in the body and brain. Aceglutamide functions as a prodrug to glutamine with improved potency and stability.

Aceglutamide is used as a psychostimulant and nootropic, while aceglutamide aluminium is used in the treatment of ulcers. Aceglutamide can also be used as a liquid-stable source of glutamine to prevent damage from protein energy malnutrition. The drug has shown neuroprotective effects in an animal model of cerebral ischemia.

== See also ==
- Aceburic acid
- Aceturic acid
- N-Acetylglutamic acid
