= N-Acetyl-L-tyrosine =

Chemical compound

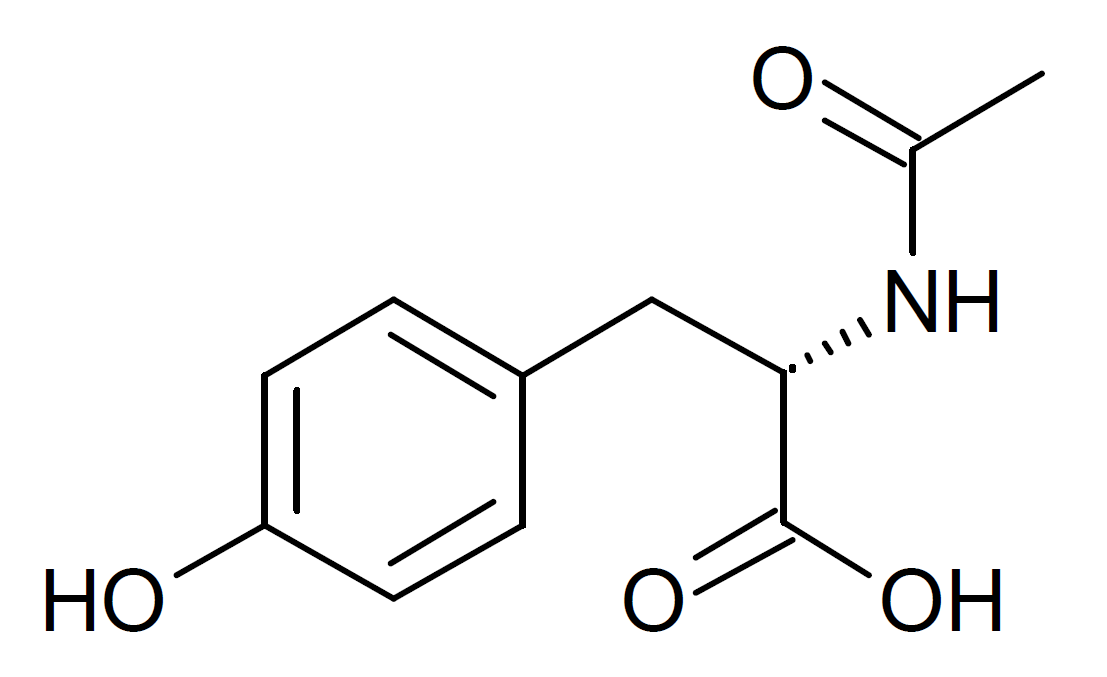

Identifiers
- IUPAC name: (2S)-2-acetamido-3-(4-hydroxyphenyl)propanoic acid
- CAS Number: 537-55-3
- PubChem CID: 68310
- DrugBank: DB11102
- ChemSpider: 61606
- UNII: DA8G610ZO5
- ChEBI: CHEBI:21563
- ChEMBL: ChEMBL65543
- CompTox Dashboard (EPA): DTXSID7046045
- ECHA InfoCard: 100.007.885

Chemical and physical data
- Formula: C_{11}H_{13}NO_{4}
- Molar mass: 223.228 g·mol^{−1}
- 3D model (JSmol): Interactive image
- SMILES: CC(=O)N[C@@H](CC1=CC=C(C=C1)O)C(=O)O
- InChI: InChI=1S/C11H13NO4/c1-7(13)12-10(11(15)16)6-8-2-4-9(14)5-3-8/h2-5,10,14H,6H2,1H3,(H,12,13)(H,15,16)/t10-/m0/s1; Key:CAHKINHBCWCHCF-JTQLQIEISA-N

N-Acetyl-L-tyrosine is an amino acid, an N-acetyl derivative of tyrosine. It is used for parenteral nutrition and as a dietary supplement.

== See also ==
- Acetylcarnitine
- Acetylcysteine
- N-Acetylserotonin
