= Arginine alpha-ketoglutarate =

Chemical compound

Arginine alpha-ketoglutarate (AAKG) is a salt of the amino acid arginine and alpha-ketoglutaric acid. It is marketed as a bodybuilding supplement.

Peer-reviewed studies have found no increase in muscle protein synthesis or improvement in muscle strength from use of AAKG as a dietary supplement.
