= Acetylornithine deacetylase =

Class of enzymes

Identifiers
- EC no.: 3.5.1.16
- CAS no.: 9025-12-1

Databases
- BRENDA: enzyme data
- ExPASy: NiceZyme view
- KEGG: enzyme entry
- MetaCyc: metabolic pathway
- Rhea: reactions
- PDB structures: RCSB PDB PDBe PDBsum
- Gene Ontology: AmiGO / QuickGO
Search
- PMC: articles
- PubMed: articles
- NCBI: proteins

Acetylornithine deacetylase (EC 3.5.1.16) is an enzyme that catalyzes the chemical reaction

N(2)-acetyl-L-ornithine
H_{2}O
ornithine
+
acetic acid

The enzyme characterised from Escherichia coli hydrolyses N(2)-acetyl-L-ornithine to the amino acid, ornithine, and acetic acid. The reaction is the final step in the biosynthesis of ornithine in plants such as Arabidopsis thaliana. The presence of this enzyme has been shown to be one factor in enhancing the aroma of basmati rice.

This enzyme is a hydrolase, one acting on carbon-nitrogen bonds other than peptide bonds, specifically in linear amides. The systematic name of this enzyme class is N2-acetyl-L-ornithine amidohydrolase. Other names in use include acetylornithinase, N-acetylornithinase, and 2-N-acetyl-L-ornithine amidohydrolase.

== Structural studies ==
As of late 2007, two structures have been solved for this class of enzymes, with PDB accession codes PDB: 2F7V and PDB: 2F8H.
