= 3-Ureidopropionic acid =

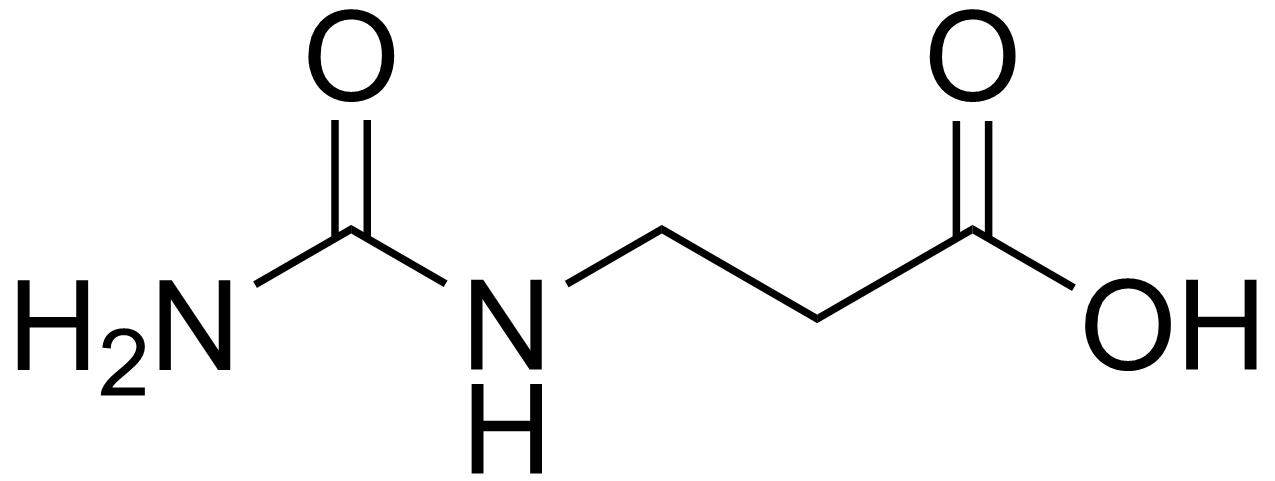
- Skeletal formula of 3-ureidopropionic acid

Names
- Preferred IUPAC name 3-(Carbamoylamino)propanoic acid
- Other names 3-Ureidopropanoic acid

Identifiers
| CAS Number | 462-88-4 |
| 3D model (JSmol) | Interactive image |
| Beilstein Reference | 1705263 |
| ChEBI | CHEBI:18261 |
| ChEMBL | ChEMBL20962 |
| ChemSpider | 109 |
| ECHA InfoCard | 100.255.338 |
| EC Number | 820-838-8 |
| Gmelin Reference | 675230 |
| KEGG | C02642 |
| MeSH | N-carbamoyl-beta-alanine |
| PubChem CID | 111 |
| UNII | C24QL9BQ36 |
| CompTox Dashboard (EPA) | DTXSID60196771 |
- InChI: InChI=1S/C4H8N2O3/c5-4(9)6-2-1-3(7)8/h1-2H2,(H,7,8)(H3,5,6,9) Key: JSJWCHRYRHKBBW-UHFFFAOYSA-N
- SMILES: NC(=O)NCCC(O)=O

Properties
| Chemical formula | C_{4}H_{8}N_{2}O_{3} |
| Molar mass | 132.119 g·mol^{−1} |
| Appearance | White crystals |
| log P | −1.23 |
| Acidity (pK_{a}) | 4.408 |
| Basicity (pK_{b}) | 9.589 |

Hazards
- GHS labelling
| Pictograms | (GHS07: Exclamation mark) |
| Signal word | Warning |
| Hazard statements | H302, H315, H319, H335 |
| Precautionary statements | P261, P264, P270, P271, P280, P301+P312, P302+P352, P304+P340, P305+P351+P338, P312, P321, P330, P332+P313, P337+P313, P362, P403+P233, P405, P501 |

Related compounds
| Related alkanoic acids | beta-Ureidoisobutyric acid; Carbamoyl aspartic acid; N-Acetylaspartic acid |
| Related compounds | Biuret; Bromisoval; Carbromal |
- Except where otherwise noted, data are given for materials in their standard state (at 25 °C [77 °F], 100 kPa). verify (what is ?) Infobox references

3-Ureidopropionic acid, also called N-carbamoyl-β-alanine, is an intermediate in the metabolism of uracil. It is a urea derivative of beta-alanine.
