= Carbamoyl aspartic acid =

- Skeletal formula of carbamoyl aspartic acid

Names
- IUPAC name 2-(Carbamoylamino)butanedioic acid

Identifiers
CAS Number	923-37-5; 13184-27-5 S
3D model (JSmol)	Interactive image
Beilstein Reference	1726861, 1726860 S
ChEBI	CHEBI:15859
ChEMBL	ChEMBL1161506
ChemSpider	273; 1267120 R; 84022 S
DrugBank	DB04252
ECHA InfoCard	100.011.906
EC Number	213-096-6
KEGG	C00438
MeSH	ureidosuccinic+acid
PubChem CID	279; 1550569 R; 93072 S
UNII	O3Y2KY16L1; R2521024DK S
CompTox Dashboard (EPA)	DTXSID701030182
- InChI: InChI=1S/C5H8N2O5/c6-5(12)7-2(4(10)11)1-3(8)9/h2H,1H2,(H,8,9)(H,10,11)(H3,6,7,12) Key: HLKXYZVTANABHZ-UHFFFAOYSA-N
- SMILES: NC(=O)NC(CC(=O)O)C(=O)O

Properties
Chemical formula	C_{5}H_{8}N_{2}O_{5}
Molar mass	176.128 g·mol^{−1}
log P	−0.663
Acidity (pK_{a})	3.649
Basicity (pK_{b})	10.348

Related compounds
Related alkanoic acids	3-Ureidopropionic acid; beta-Ureidoisobutyric acid; N-Acetylaspartic acid
Related compounds	Biuret; Bromisoval; Carbromal
- Except where otherwise noted, data are given for materials in their standard state (at 25 °C [77 °F], 100 kPa). Infobox references

Carbamoyl aspartic acid (or ureidosuccinic acid) is a carbamate derivative, serving as an intermediate in pyrimidine biosynthesis.
