= Methylarginine =

- Stereo, skeletal formula of methylarginine (S) (S)-Methylarginine

Names
- Other names 2-Amino-5-[(N’-methylcarbamimidoyl)amino]pentanoic acid; N-Monomethylarginine; omega-N-Methylarginine; Tilarginine; Targinine

Identifiers
CAS Number	17035-90-4 (S)
3D model (JSmol)	Interactive image
Beilstein Reference	2262067 (R)
ChEBI	CHEBI:28229
ChEMBL	ChEMBL312870; ChEMBL109350; ChEMBL256147
ChemSpider	4213; 2015298 (R); 117259 (S)
KEGG	C03884
MeSH	omega-N-Methylarginine
PubChem CID	4366; 2733510 (R); 132862 (S)
UNII	27JT06E6GR
CompTox Dashboard (EPA)	DTXSID50860196
- InChI: InChI=1S/C7H16N4O2/c1-10-7(9)11-4-2-3-5(8)6(12)13/h5H,2-4,8H2,1H3,(H,12,13)(H3,9,10,11) Key: NTNWOCRCBQPEKQ-UHFFFAOYSA-N
- SMILES: CNC(=N)NCCCC(N)C(O)=O

Properties
Chemical formula	C_{7}H_{16}N_{4}O_{2}
Molar mass	188.231 g·mol^{−1}
log P	−0.63
Acidity (pK_{a})	2.512
Basicity (pK_{b})	11.488

Related compounds
Related alkanoic acids	Asymmetric dimethylarginine; N-Propyl-L-arginine
Related compounds	Buformin; Acecarbromal
- Except where otherwise noted, data are given for materials in their standard state (at 25 °C [77 °F], 100 kPa). verify (what is ?) Infobox references

N-Methylarginine is an inhibitor of nitric oxide synthase. Chemically, it is a methyl derivative of the amino acid arginine. It is used as a biochemical tool in the study of physiological role of nitric oxide.

The inhibiting effect of N-methylarginine on vasodilation is lower in hypertensive patients than in normal subjects, indicating endothelial dysfunction. The inhibiting effect of N-methylarginine on vasodilation declines progressively with age, but has been restored with vitamin C in the oldest subjects.

== See also ==
- Asymmetric dimethylarginine
