= Citrulline =

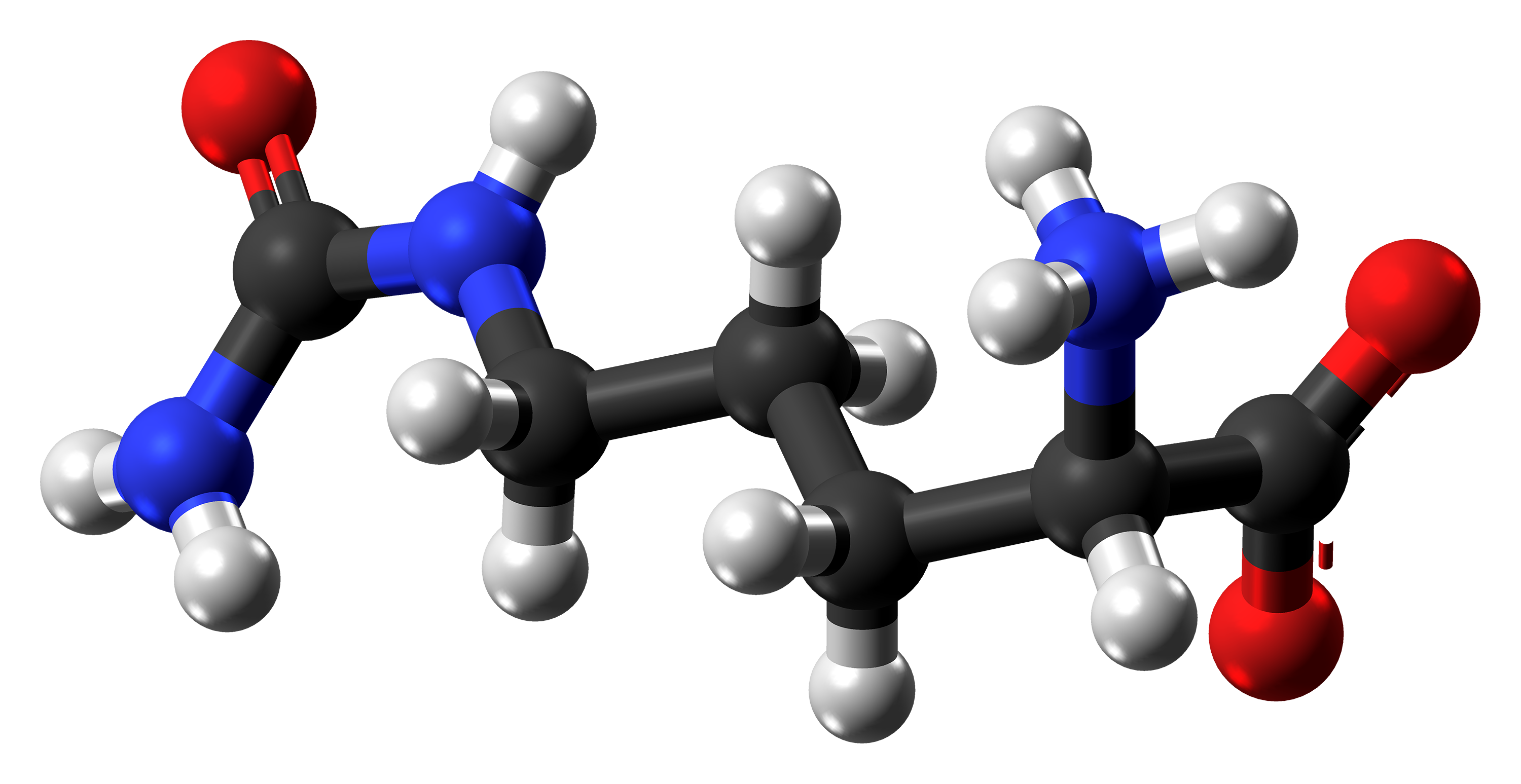
- Ball and stick model of zwitterionic citrulline

Names
- IUPAC name 2-Amino-5-(carbamoylamino)pentanoic acid

Identifiers
| CAS Number | 627-77-0; 13594-51-9 (D); 372-75-8 (L) |
| 3D model (JSmol) | Interactive image |
| Beilstein Reference | 1725417, 1725415 D, 1725416 L |
| ChEBI | CHEBI:18211 |
| ChEMBL | ChEMBL444814 |
| ChemSpider | 810; 553200 D; 9367 L |
| DrugBank | DB00155 |
| ECHA InfoCard | 100.006.145 |
| EC Number | 211-012-2 |
| Gmelin Reference | 774677 L |
| IUPHAR/BPS | 722 |
| KEGG | D07706 |
| MeSH | Citrulline |
| PubChem CID | 833; 637599 D; 9750 L |
| UNII | 1OYO2NV4NM; KNS2VUH6P2 (D); 29VT07BGDA (L) |
| CompTox Dashboard (EPA) | DTXSID80883373 |
- InChI: InChI=1S/C6H13N3O3/c7-4(5(10)11)2-1-3-9-6(8)12/h4H,1-3,7H2,(H,10,11)(H3,8,9,12) Key: RHGKLRLOHDJJDR-UHFFFAOYSA-N
- SMILES: NC(CCCNC(N)=O)C(O)=O

Properties
| Chemical formula | C_{6}H_{13}N_{3}O_{3} |
| Molar mass | 175.188 g·mol^{−1} |
| Appearance | White crystals |
| Odor | Odourless |
| log P | −1.373 |
| Acidity (pK_{a}) | 2.508 |
| Basicity (pK_{b}) | 11.489 |

Thermochemistry
| Heat capacity (C) | 232.80 J K^{−1} mol^{−1} |
| Std molar entropy (S^{⦵}_{298}) | 254.4 J K^{−1} mol^{−1} |

Related compounds
| Related alkanoic acids | N-Acetylaspartic acid; Aceglutamide; N-Acetylglutamic acid; Pivagabine |
| Related compounds | Bromisoval; Carbromal |
- Except where otherwise noted, data are given for materials in their standard state (at 25 °C [77 °F], 100 kPa). verify (what is ?) Infobox references

The organic compound citrulline is a non-essential α-amino acid. Its name is derived from citrullus, the Latin word for watermelon. Although named and described by gastroenterologists since the late 19th century, it was first isolated from watermelon in 1914 by Japanese researchers Yatarō Koga and Ryō Ōtake, and further codified in 1930.

Citrulline has the formula H_{2}NC(O)NH(CH_{2})_{3}CH(NH_{2})CO_{2}H. It is a key intermediate in the urea cycle, the pathway by which mammals excrete ammonia by converting it into urea. Citrulline is also produced as a byproduct of the enzymatic production of nitric oxide from the amino acid arginine, catalyzed by nitric oxide synthase.

== Biosynthesis ==
Citrulline can be derived from:

- from arginine via nitric oxide synthase, as a byproduct of the production of nitric oxide for signaling purposes
- from ornithine through the breakdown of proline or glutamine/glutamate
- from asymmetric dimethylarginine via DDAH

Citrulline is made from ornithine and carbamoyl phosphate in one of the central reactions in the urea cycle. It is also produced from arginine as a byproduct of the reaction catalyzed by NOS family (NOS; EC 1.14.13.39). It is also prevalent in trichohyalin at the inner root sheath and medulla of hair follicles, where it is synthesized from arginine. Arginine is first oxidized into N-hydroxyl-arginine, which is then further converted to citrulline concomitant with release of nitric oxide.

== Function ==
Citrulline is a metabolic intermediate within the urea cycle, which is the pathway by which mammals excrete ammonia by converting it into urea. Citrulline is also produced as a byproduct of the enzymatic production of nitric oxide from the amino acid arginine, catalyzed by nitric oxide synthase. In the yeast species Saccharomyces cerevisiae, citrulline is a metabolic intermediate in the latter, cytosolic half of the arginine biosynthesis pathway.

Several proteins contain citrulline as a result of a post-translational modification. These citrulline residues are generated by a family of enzymes called peptidylarginine deiminases, which convert arginine into citrulline in a process called citrullination or deimination with the help of calcium ions. Proteins that normally contain citrulline residues include myelin basic protein, filaggrin, and several histone proteins, whereas other proteins, such as fibrin and vimentin are susceptible to citrullination during cell death and tissue inflammation.

Circulating citrulline concentration is a biomarker of intestinal functionality.

== Uses ==
L-citrulline is sold as a dietary supplement. It may be used in commercial products as a topical moisturizing agent for skin or for hairstyling.

Although promoted to support athletic performance, there is no good evidence that taking citrulline as a supplement is effective or safe for this purpose. Citrulline has not been approved as a prescription drug, has no confirmed clinical uses, and remains under preliminary research, as of 2026.

== See also ==
- Citrullinemia
