= Carbromal =

- Skeletal formula of carbromal

Names
- IUPAC name 2-Bromo-N-carbamoyl-2-ethylbutanamide

Identifiers
CAS Number	77-65-6
3D model (JSmol)	Interactive image
ChEMBL	ChEMBL1697828
ChemSpider	6243
ECHA InfoCard	100.000.952
EC Number	201-046-6
KEGG	D02619
MeSH	carbromal
PubChem CID	6488
UNII	0Y299JY9V3
CompTox Dashboard (EPA)	DTXSID8020252
- InChI: InChI=1S/C7H13BrN2O2/c1-3-7(8,4-2)5(11)10-6(9)12/h3-4H2,1-2H3,(H3,9,10,11,12) Key: OPNPQXLQERQBBV-UHFFFAOYSA-N
- SMILES: CCC(Br)(CC)C(=O)NC(N)=O

Properties
Chemical formula	C_{7}H_{13}BrN_{2}O_{2}
Molar mass	237.097 g·mol^{−1}
Appearance	White crystals
Odor	Odorless
Density	1.544 g/cm^{3}
Melting point	119 °C (246 °F; 392 K)
Solubility in water	Soluble
Solubility	soluble in chloroform, ether, acetone, benzene
log P	1.623
Acidity (pK_{a})	10.69
Basicity (pK_{b})	3.31

Structure
Crystal structure	rhombic

Pharmacology
ATC code	N05CM04 (WHO)

Related compounds
Related ureas	Bromisoval
Related compounds	3-Ureidopropionic acid; beta-Ureidoisobutyric acid; Carbamoyl aspartic acid; N-Acetylaspartic acid; Aceglutamide; N-Acetylglutamic acid; Citrulline
- Except where otherwise noted, data are given for materials in their standard state (at 25 °C [77 °F], 100 kPa). Infobox references

Carbromal is a hypnotic and sedative originally synthesized by Bayer in 1909 and later marketed as Adalin. Parke-Davis later marketed the drug in combination with pentobarbital as Carbrital. As of 2015, it was still used in Hungary in combination with aminophenazone under the name Demalgon.

== Synthesis ==
thumb

Diethylmalonic acid [510-20-3]. is decarboxylated to 2-ethylvaleric acid [20225-24-5]. The Hell-Volhard-Zelinsky reaction converts this to 2-bromo-2-ethylbutyryl bromide [26074-53-3] Reaction with urea afforda carbromal.

== See also ==
- Acecarbromal
- Bromisoval
- Apronal
