= Acetylornithinase =

Acetylornithinase may refer to:

- Acetylornithine deacetylase, an enzyme
- Glutamate N-acetyltransferase, an enzyme
