= Carbamate kinase =

Enzyme

Identifiers
- EC no.: 2.7.2.2
- CAS no.: 9026-69-1

Databases
- IntEnz: IntEnz view
- BRENDA: BRENDA entry
- ExPASy: NiceZyme view
- KEGG: KEGG entry
- MetaCyc: metabolic pathway
- PRIAM: profile
- PDB structures: RCSB PDB PDBe PDBsum
- Gene Ontology: AmiGO / QuickGO
Search
- PMC: articles
- PubMed: articles
- NCBI: proteins

Carbamate kinase (EC 2.7.2.2) is an enzyme that catalyzes a reversible chemical reaction:

ATP + NH_{3} + H_{2}CO_{3}
H_{2}O
H_{2}O
ADP +
carbamoyl phosphate

The enzyme characterised from Streptococcus faecalis, Serratia marcescens, Neurospora crassa, and Lathyrus sativus transfers a phosphate group between adenosine triphosphate (ATP) and adenosine diphosphate (ADP). In the forward direction shown, ammonia and carbonic acid are components of the reaction, giving water and carbamoyl phosphate as products. However, an important function of the enzyme is to make ATP from ADP.

This enzyme is a transferase, specifically one transferring phosphorus-containing groups (phosphotransferases) with a carboxy group as acceptor. The systematic name of this enzyme class is ATP:carbamate phosphotransferase. Other names in common use include CKase, carbamoyl phosphokinase, and carbamyl phosphokinase.

== Structural studies ==
As of late 2007, three structures have been solved for this class of enzymes, with PDB accession codes PDB: 1B7B, PDB: 1E19, and PDB: 2E9Y. The first was published in 1966.
