= N-Acetylaspartylglutamic acid =

Peptide neurotransmitter

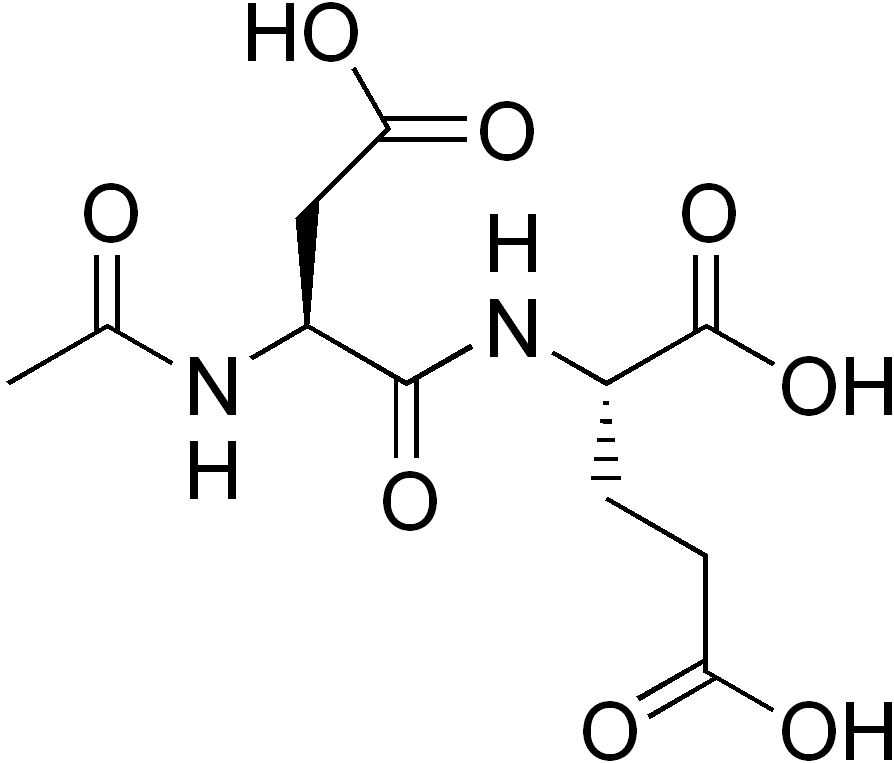
- Stereo, skeletal formula of N-acetylaspartylglutamic acid

Names
- Systematic IUPAC name (2S)-2-[(2S)-2-Acetamido-3-carboxypropanamido]pentanedioic acid
- Other names: N-Acetyl-L-α-aspartyl-L-glutamic acid; N-Acetyl-1-aspartylglutamic acid; Isospaglumic acid; Spaglumic acid

Identifiers
CAS Number	3106-85-2
3D model (JSmol)	Interactive image
Abbreviations	NAAG
ChemSpider	164080
ECHA InfoCard	100.163.604
MeSH	N-acetyl-1-aspartylglutamic+acid
PubChem CID	188803
UNII	1W8M12WXYL
CompTox Dashboard (EPA)	DTXSID3091535
- InChI: InChI=1S/C11H16N2O8/c1-5(14)12-7(4-9(17)18)10(19)13-6(11(20)21)2-3-8(15)16/h6-7H,2-4H2,1H3,(H,12,14)(H,13,19)(H,15,16)(H,17,18)(H,20,21)/t6-,7-/m0/s1 Key: OPVPGKGADVGKTG-BQBZGAKWSA-N
- SMILES: CC(=O)N[C@@H](CC(O)=O)C(=O)N[C@@H](CCC(O)=O)C(O)=O

Properties
Chemical formula	C_{11}H_{16}N_{2}O_{8}
Molar mass	304.255 g·mol^{−1}

Pharmacology
ATC code	R01AC05 (WHO) S01GX03 (WHO)
- Except where otherwise noted, data are given for materials in their standard state (at 25 °C [77 °F], 100 kPa). verify (what is ?) Infobox references

N-Acetylaspartylglutamic acid (N-acetylaspartylglutamate or NAAG) is a peptide neurotransmitter and the third-most-prevalent neurotransmitter in the mammalian nervous system. NAAG consists of N-acetylaspartic acid (NAA) and glutamic acid coupled via a peptide bond.

NAAG was discovered as a nervous system-specific peptide in 1965 by Curatolo and colleagues but initially disregarded as a neurotransmitter and not extensively studied. However it meets the criteria for a neurotransmitter, including being concentrated in neurons, packed in synaptic vesicles, released in a calcium-dependent manner, and hydrolyzed in the synaptic space by enzymatic activity.

NAAG activates a specific receptor, the metabotropic glutamate receptor type 3. It is synthesized enzymatically from its two precursors and catabolized by NAAG peptidases in the synapse. The inhibition of the latter enzymes has potentially important therapeutic effects in animal models of several neurologic conditions and disorders.

Under the INN spaglumic acid, NAAG is used as an antiallergic medication in eye drops and nasal preparations.

== Research history ==
After its discovery in 1965, NAAG was disregarded as a neurotransmitter for several reasons. First, neuropeptides were not considered neurotransmitters until years later. Second, it did not seem to directly affect membrane potential, so it was classified as a metabolic intermediate. The importance of brain peptides became clearer with the discovery of endogenous opioids. Whereas the ability of NAAG to interact with NMDA receptors in a manner relevant to physiology is controversial, its primary receptor was long believed to be the mGluR3. Its interaction with the mGluR3 causes an activation of G proteins that reduce the concentration of the second messengers cAMP and cGMP in both the nerve cells and glia. This can lead to several changes in the cellular activity, including regulation of gene expression, reduction in the release of transmitter, and inhibition of long-term potentiation. Stimulation of the mGluR3 by NAAG has been, however, questioned, finding relevant glutamate contamination in commercially available NAAG.

According to one publication, NAAG can be differentiated from NAA in vivo by MR spectroscopy at 3 tesla.

== Biosynthesis ==
NAAG synthetase activity mediates the biosynthesis of NAAG from glutamate and NAA, but little is known about the mechanism or regulation of this enzyme, and no NAAG synthetase activity has been isolated in cell-free preparations. Since other neuropeptides and nearly all vertebrate peptides are synthesized by post-translational processing, NAAG synthetase activity is relatively unique. As with NAA, the synthesis of NAAG is primarily restricted to neurons, although glial cells also contain and synthesize this peptide. In vitro, NAAG synthesis appears to be regulated by the availability of its precursor, NAA. In addition, during differentiation of neuroblastoma cells, it has been shown that a protein kinase A (PKA) activator will increase the quantity of NAAG, while a protein kinase C (PKC) activator will decrease its concentration. This finding suggests that PKA and PKC have opposing regulatory effects on the NAAG synthetase enzyme.

== Catabolism ==
NAAG is catabolized via NAAG peptidase activity. Two enzymes with NAAG peptidase activity have been cloned, glutamate carboxypeptidase II and glutamate carboxypeptidase III. These enzymes mediate the hydrolysis of NAAG to NAA and glutamate. Their inhibition can produce therapeutic benefits. Two main types of inhibitors of this enzyme are known: compounds related to 2-(phosphonomethyl)pentanedioic acid (2-PMPA) and urea-based analogs of NAAG, including ZJ43, ZJ17, and ZJ11. In rat models, ZJ43 and 2-PMPA reduce perception of inflammatory and neuropathic pain when administered systemically, intracerebrally, or locally, suggesting that NAAG modulates neurotransmission in pain circuits via mGlu3 receptors. The inhibition of NAAG hydrolysis increases the concentration of NAAG in the synaptic space analogous to the effects of MAOIs in increasing the concentration of serotonin. This elevated NAAG gives greater activation of presynaptic mGluR3 receptors, which decrease release of transmitter (glutamate) in the pain signaling pathways of the spinal cord and brain. In the case of traumatic brain injury, the injection of a NAAG peptidase inhibitor reduces neuron and astrocyte death in the hippocampus nearest the site of the injury. In a mouse model of amyotrophic lateral sclerosis (ALS), the chronic inhibition of NAAG peptidase activity delayed the onset of ALS symptoms and slowed the progress of the neuronal death. To model schizophrenia, animals were injected with phencyclidine (PCP) and, therefore, exhibited symptoms of the disorder, such as social withdrawal and motor responses. Upon injection with ZJ43, these behaviors were decreased, suggesting that an increase in NAAG in the synapse — and its subsequent activation of mGluR3 receptors — has potential as a co-therapy for schizophrenia. In these cases, NAAG peptidase inhibition reduces the adverse effects in these disorders. Future research focuses on the role of NAAG in pain perception, brain injury, and schizophrenia while developing NAAG peptidase inhibitors with even greater ability to cross the blood–brain barrier.^{[16][17]}

== See also ==
- Aspartate
- Glutamate
