= N-Acetylaspartic acid =

Derivative of aspartic acid found in the brain

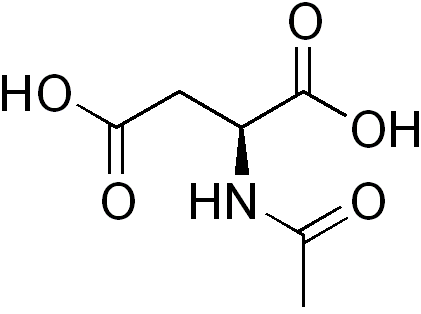
- Stereo, skeletal formula of N-acetylaspartic acid (S)

Names
- IUPAC name 2-Acetamidobutanedioic acid

Identifiers
CAS Number	2545-40-6; 997-55-7 S
3D model (JSmol)	Interactive image
Beilstein Reference	1726198 S
ChEBI	CHEBI:21547
ChEMBL	ChEMBL1162493
ChemSpider	88007; 677387 R
ECHA InfoCard	100.012.403
EC Number	219-827-5
KEGG	C01042
MeSH	N-acetylaspartate
PubChem CID	97508; 774916 R; 65065 S
RTECS number	CI9098600
UNII	445Y04YIWR
CompTox Dashboard (EPA)	DTXSID40897219
- InChI: InChI=1S/C6H9NO5/c1-3(8)7-4(6(11)12)2-5(9)10/h4H,2H2,1H3,(H,7,8)(H,9,10)(H,11,12) Key: OTCCIMWXFLJLIA-UHFFFAOYSA-N
- SMILES: CC(=O)N[C@@H](CC(=O)O)C(=O)O

Properties
Chemical formula	C_{6}H_{9}NO_{5}
Molar mass	175.140 g·mol^{−1}
Appearance	Colourless, transparent crystals
Melting point	137 to 140 °C (279 to 284 °F; 410 to 413 K)
Boiling point	141 to 144 °C (286 to 291 °F; 414 to 417 K)
log P	−2.209
Acidity (pK_{a})	3.142
Basicity (pK_{b})	10.855

Hazards
- GHS labelling
Pictograms	(GHS07: Exclamation mark)
Signal word	Warning
Hazard statements	H315, H319, H335
Precautionary statements	P261, P264, P271, P280, P302+P352, P304+P340, P305+P351+P338, P312, P321, P332+P313, P337+P313, P362, P403+P233, P405, P501

Related compounds
Related alkanoic acids	3-Ureidopropionic acid; beta-Ureidoisobutyric acid; Carbamoyl aspartic acid; Aceglutamide; N-Acetylglutamic acid; Citrulline
Related compounds	Bromisoval; Carbromal
- Except where otherwise noted, data are given for materials in their standard state (at 25 °C [77 °F], 100 kPa). verify (what is ?) Infobox references

N-Acetylaspartic acid, or N-acetylaspartate (NAA), is a derivative of aspartic acid with a formula of C_{6}H_{9}NO_{5} and a molecular weight of 175.139.

NAA is the second-most-concentrated molecule in the brain after the amino acid glutamate. It is detected in the adult brain in neurons, oligodendrocytes and myelin and is synthesized in the mitochondria from the amino acid aspartic acid and acetyl-coenzyme A.

== Function ==
The various functions served by NAA are under investigation, but the primary proposed functions include:

- Neuronal osmolyte that is involved in fluid balance in the brain
- Source of acetate for lipid and myelin synthesis in oligodendrocytes, the glial cells that myelinate neuronal axons
- Precursor for the synthesis of the neuronal dipeptide N-Acetylaspartylglutamate
- Contributor to energy production from the amino acid glutamate in neuronal mitochondria.

In the brain, NAA was thought to be present predominantly in neuronal cell bodies, where it acts as a neuronal marker, but it is also free to diffuse throughout neuronal fibers.

== Applications ==
However, the recent discovery of a higher concentration of NAA in myelin and oligodendrocytes than in neurons raises questions about the validity of the use of NAA as a neuronal marker. NAA gives off the largest signal in magnetic resonance spectroscopy of the human brain. The levels measured there are decreased in numerous neuropathological conditions ranging from brain injury to stroke to Alzheimer's disease. This fact makes NAA a potential diagnostic molecule for doctors treating patients with brain damage or disease.

NAA may be a marker of creativity. High NAA levels in the hippocampus are related to better working memory performance in humans. Whole-brain levels of NAA have also been found to be positively correlated with educational attainment in adults.

NAA may function as a neurotransmitter in the brain by acting on metabotropic glutamate receptors.

== See also ==
- Aspartoacylase
- Canavan disease
