= Freezing Point (Miura novel) =

1960s novel by Ayako Miura

Freezing Point (氷点; Hyōten) is the debut novel of Japanese novelist Ayako Miura, first serialized on Asahi Shimbun between 1964 and 1965. The novel won Asahi Shimbun's Ten Million Yen Award.

The novel has been adapted into numerous films and TV series in East Asia. An English translation by Hiromu Shimizu and John Terry was published in 1986.

== English translation ==
- Miura, Ayako (1986). Freezing Point. Translated by Hiromu Shimizu; John Terry. Dawn Press. ISBN 0933704291.

== Adaptations ==
=== Film ===
- Freezing Point, a 1966 Japanese film directed by Satsuo Yamamoto
- Freezing Point (冰點), a 1966 Taiwanese film directed by Hsin Chi
- Freezing Point (빙점), a 1967 South Korean film directed by Kim Soo-yong
- Freezing Point (빙점), a 1981 South Korean film directed by Ko Young-nam

=== TV series ===
- Freezing Point, a 1966 Japanese TV series on Nihon Educational Television
- Freezing Point, a 1971 Japanese TV series on Tokyo Broadcasting System
- Freezing Point, a 1981 Japanese TV series on Mainichi Broadcasting System
- Freezing Point, a 1981 Japanese TV series on Yomiuri Telecasting Corporation
- Freezing Point, a 1989 Japanese TV series on TV Asahi
- Freezing Point, a 2001 Japanese TV series on TV Asahi
- Freezing Point, a 2006 Japanese TV series on TV Asahi
- Freezing Point (冰點), a 1988 Taiwanese TV series on Chinese Television System
- Freezing Point (빙점), a 1990 South Korean TV series on Korean Broadcasting System
- Freezing Point (빙점), a 2004 South Korean TV series on Munhwa Broadcasting Corporation

== Sequel ==
Miura wrote the sequel Sequel to Freezing Point (続氷点) in 1971, and it was adapted for TV that year on TV Asahi.

== See also ==
- Asahikawa
