= Apronal =

Chemical compound

- Molecular structure of apronal

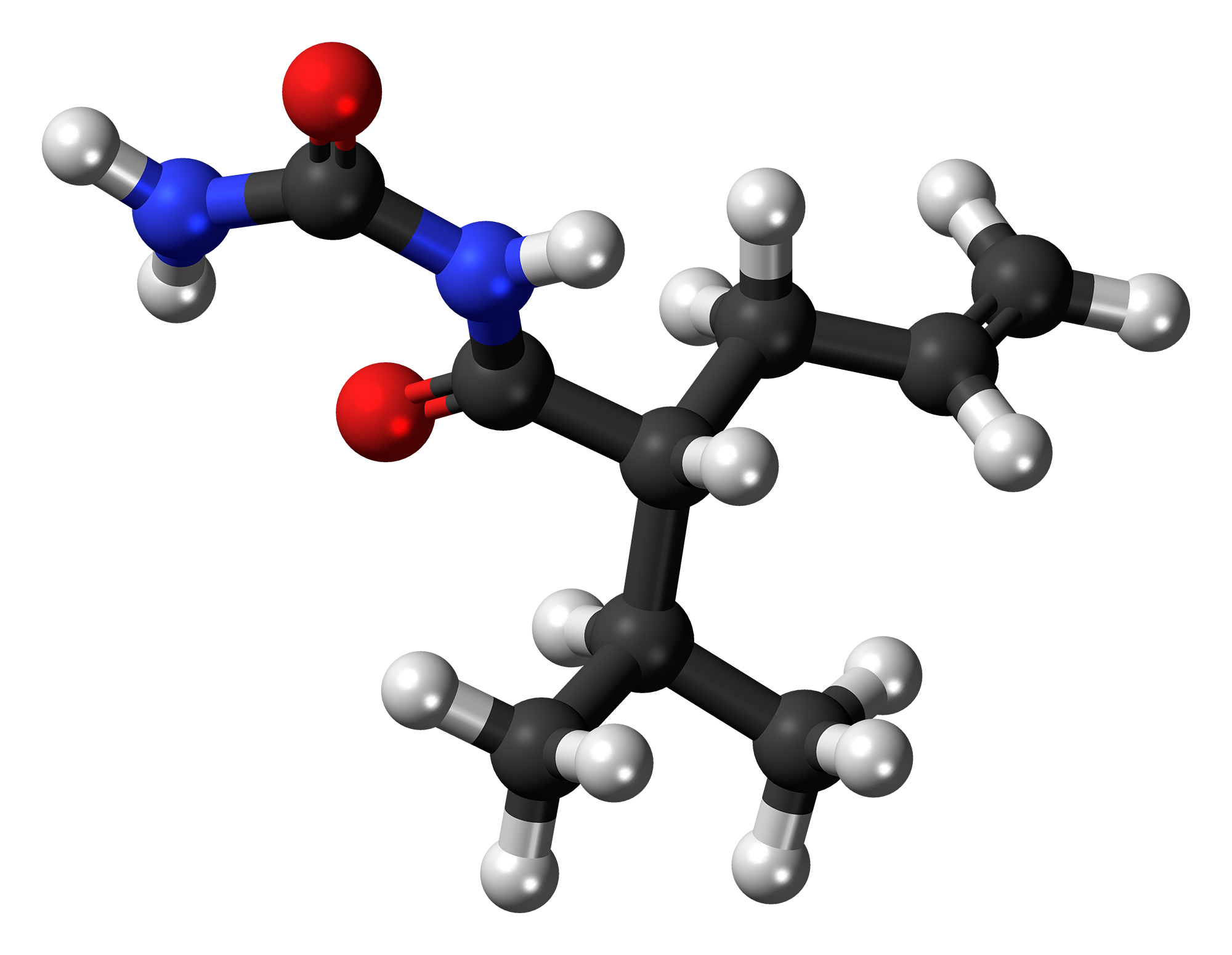
- 3D representation of an (R)-apronal molecule

Clinical data
- Routes of administration: Oral
- ATC code: N05CM12 (WHO)

Pharmacokinetic data
- Excretion: Renal

Identifiers
- IUPAC name: (±)-N-Carbamoyl-2-propan-2-ylpent-4-enamide
- CAS Number: 528-92-7
- PubChem CID: 10715
- ChemSpider: 10264
- UNII: V18J24E25E
- KEGG: D03975
- ChEMBL: ChEMBL509282
- CompTox Dashboard (EPA): DTXSID00862125
- ECHA InfoCard: 100.007.677

Chemical and physical data
- Formula: C_{9}H_{16}N_{2}O_{2}
- Molar mass: 184.239 g·mol^{−1}
- 3D model (JSmol): Interactive image
- Chirality: Racemic mixture
- SMILES: O=C(NC(=O)N)C(C(C)C)C\C=C
- InChI: InChI=1S/C9H16N2O2/c1-4-5-7(6(2)3)8(12)11-9(10)13/h4,6-7H,1,5H2,2-3H3,(H3,10,11,12,13); Key:KSUUMAWCGDNLFK-UHFFFAOYSA-N

Apronal (brand name Sedormid), or apronalide, also known as allylisopropylacetylurea or allylisopropylacetylcarbamide, is a hypnotic/sedative drug of the ureide (acylurea) group synthesized in 1926 by Hoffmann-La Roche. Though it is not a barbiturate, apronal is similar in structure to the barbiturates (being an open-chain carbamide instead of having a heterocyclic ring). In accordance, it is similar in action to the barbiturates, although considerably milder in comparison (formerly used as a daytime sedative at doses of 1 to 2 grams every 3 to 4 hours). Upon the finding that it caused patients to develop thrombocytopenic purpura, apronal was withdrawn from clinical use.

Medicines with apronal are no longer used except in Japan and South Korea. The Therapeutic Goods Administration issued a safety alert in May 2023 which prohibits the sale, supply and use of Japanese EVE-branded products in Australia due to its dangerous side effects.

== See also ==
- Bromoureide
- Japanese: アリルイソプロピルアセチル尿素
