= Phenylacetyl-CoA hydrolase =

Class of enzymes

Identifiers
- EC no.: 3.1.2.25

Databases
- BRENDA: enzyme data
- ExPASy: NiceZyme view
- KEGG: enzyme entry
- MetaCyc: metabolic pathway
- Rhea: reactions
- PDB structures: RCSB PDB PDBe PDBsum
Search
- PMC: articles
- PubMed: articles
- NCBI: proteins

The enzyme phenylacetyl-CoA hydrolase (EC 3.1.2.25) catalyzes the reaction

phenylglyoxylyl-CoA
H_{2}O
coenzyme A
+
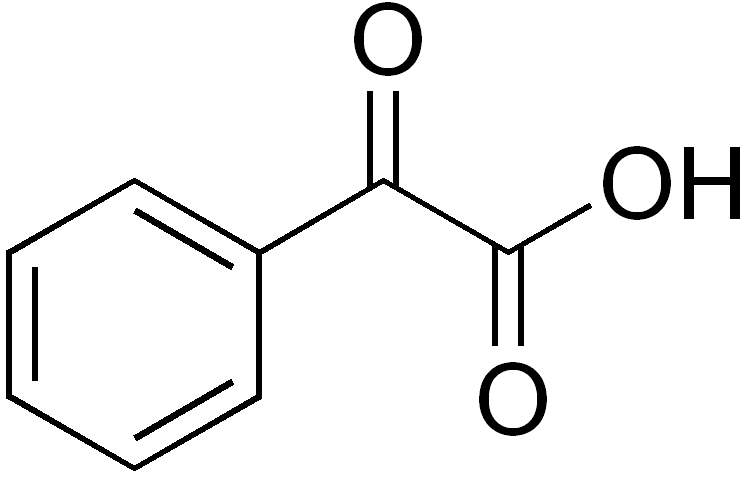
phenylglyoxylic acid

The enzyme characterised from the bacterium Thauera aromatica hydrolyses phenylglyoxylyl-CoA to coenzyme A and phenylglyoxylic acid, which form the thioester in the starting material. This is the second step in a pathway for breakdown of phenylacetyl-CoA to phenylglyoxylic acid, after the action of phenylacetyl-CoA dehydrogenase. The enzyme has also been found as part of the biosynthesis of β-Lactam antibiotics.

This enzyme is a hydrolase, specifically one acting on thioester bonds. The systematic name of this enzyme class is phenylglyoxylyl-CoA hydrolase.
