= Carbamoyl phosphate synthetase I deficiency =

- Other names: CPS I deficiency
- Specialty: Medical genetics

Carbamoyl phosphate synthetase I deficiency (CPS I deficiency) is an autosomal recessive metabolic disorder that causes ammonia to accumulate in the blood due to a lack of the enzyme carbamoyl phosphate synthetase I. Ammonia, which is formed when proteins are broken down in the body, is toxic if the levels become too high. The nervous system is especially sensitive to the effects of excess ammonia.

== Signs and symptoms ==
Carbamoyl phosphate synthetase I deficiency often becomes evident in the first few days of life. An infant with this condition may be lacking in energy (lethargic) or unwilling to eat, and have a poorly controlled breathing rate or body temperature. Some babies with this disorder may experience seizures or unusual body movements, or go into a coma. Complications of carbamoyl phosphate synthetase I deficiency may include developmental delay and intellectual disability.

In some affected individuals, signs and symptoms of carbamoyl phosphate synthetase I deficiency may be less severe, and may not appear until later in life.

== Genetics ==
Carbamoyl phosphate synthetase I deficiency has an autosomal recessive pattern of inheritance.

CPS I deficiency is inherited in an autosomal recessive manner. This means the defective gene responsible for the disorder is located on an autosome, and two copies of the defective gene (one inherited from each parent) are required in order to be born with the disorder. The parents of an individual with an autosomal recessive disorder both carry one copy of the defective gene, but usually do not experience any signs or symptoms of the disorder.

== Pathophysiology ==
Mutations in the CPS1 gene cause carbamoyl phosphate synthetase I deficiency. Carbamoyl phosphate synthetase I deficiency belongs to a class of genetic diseases called urea cycle disorders. The urea cycle is a sequence of reactions that occurs in liver cells. This cycle processes excess nitrogen, generated when protein is used by the body, to make a compound called urea that is excreted by the kidneys.

In carbamoyl phosphate synthetase I deficiency, the enzyme that regulates the urea cycle is damaged or missing. The urea cycle cannot proceed normally, and nitrogen accumulates in the bloodstream in the form of ammonia. Ammonia is especially damaging to the nervous system, and excess ammonia causes neurological problems and other signs and symptoms of carbamoyl phosphate synthetase I deficiency.

== Diagnosis ==
Prenatal diagnosis can occur through fetal liver biopsy or by using genomic DNA from amniotic fluid.

== Treatment ==
Depending on clinical status and the blood ammonia level, the logical first step is to reduce protein intake and to attempt to maintain energy intake. Initiate intravenous infusion of 10% glucose (or higher, if administered through a central line) and lipids. Intravenous sodium benzoate and sodium phenylacetate may be helpful. Arginine is usually administered with benzoate and phenylacetate. This is best administered in the setting of a major medical center where facilities for hemodialysis in infants is available. Glycerol phenylbutyrate is a pre-prodrug that undergoes metabolism to form phenylacetate. Results of a phase 3 study comparing ammonia control in adults showed glycerol phenylbutyrate was noninferior to sodium phenylbutyrate. In a separate study involving young children ages 2 months through 5 years, glycerol phenylbutyrate resulted in a more evenly distributed urinary output of PAGN over 24 hours and accounted for fewer symptoms from accumulation of phenylacetate. In patients with an extremely high blood ammonia level, rapid treatment with hemodialysis is indicated. Metabolic disease specialists should provide long-term care with very close and frequent follow-up.

A recent 2025 landmark study in The New England Journal of Medicine studied the use of base editors in carbamoyl-phosphate synthetase 1 deficiency. This approach offered a promising approach to correcting harmful genetic mutations. In one case, a newborn, KJ Muldoon, who was diagnosed with a severe form of carbamoyl-phosphate synthetase 1 deficiency—a rare disorder with a high mortality rate in early infancy—was promptly considered for a tailored treatment. Researchers quickly developed a lipid nanoparticle-based base-editing therapy designed specifically for the infant. Following regulatory authorization, the child received two doses of the treatment at around 7 and 8 months old. Over the next seven weeks, the infant tolerated a higher intake of dietary protein and a 50% reduction in the prescribed nitrogen-scavenger medication. These improvements occurred without significant side effects, even during concurrent viral infections. No serious complications were reported. Continued observation is necessary to further evaluate the long-term safety and effectiveness of the treatment.
