= Alpha-tubulin N-acetyltransferase =

Protein-coding gene in the species Homo sapiens

ATAT1

Identifiers
- Aliases: ATAT1, C6orf134, MEC17, Nbla00487, TAT, alpha-TAT, alpha-TAT1, alpha tubulin acetyltransferase 1
- External IDs: OMIM: 615556; MGI: 1913869; GeneCards: ATAT1
Available structures
PDB	Ortholog search: PDBe RCSB
PDB	List of PDB id codes 3VWD, 3VWE, 4B5O, 4B5P, 4GS4, 4IF5, 4PK2, 4PK3, 4U9Y, 4U9Z
Enzyme activity
EC #	BRENDA	ExPASy	KEGG	MetaCyc
2.3.1.108	↗	↗	↗	↗

Gene location (Human)
Chr.	Chromosome 6 (human)
Band	6p21.33	Start	30,626,842 bp
Band	6p21.33	End	30,646,823 bp

Gene location (Mouse)
Chr.	Chromosome 17 (mouse)
Band	17|17 B1	Start	35,897,595 bp
Band	17|17 B1	End	35,910,075 bp
RNA expression pattern
Bgee	Human / Mouse (ortholog); Top expressed in: ganglionic eminence; ventricular zone; amygdala; pituitary gland; hypothalamus; right uterine tube; hippocampus proper; anterior pituitary; anterior cingulate cortex; primary visual cortex / Top expressed in: neural tube; genital tubercle; ganglionic eminence; ventricular zone; Rostral migratory stream; neural layer of retina; visual cortex; primary visual cortex; tail of embryo; superior frontal gyrus; More reference expression data
BioGPS	n/a
Gene ontology
Molecular function	tubulin N-acetyltransferase activity; acyltransferase activity; transferase activity; lysine N-acetyltransferase activity, acting on acetyl phosphate as donor
Cellular component	cytoskeleton; spindle; cell projection; mitotic spindle; membrane; microtubule; microtubule bundle; clathrin-coated pit; axon; cell junction; focal adhesion; Golgi apparatus; cytoplasm; cytosol
Biological process	spermatogenesis; regulation of fat cell differentiation; alpha-tubulin acetylation; dentate gyrus development; positive regulation of NLRP3 inflammasome complex assembly; cilium assembly; regulation of microtubule cytoskeleton organization; neuron development
Sources:Amigo / QuickGO
Orthologs
Databases	NCBI: entry; OMA: entry
Species	Human	Mouse
Entrez	79969	73242
Ensembl	ENSG00000235658; ENSG00000234549; ENSG00000229061; ENSG00000223752; ENSG00000206488 ENSG00000231257; ENSG00000137343	ENSMUSG00000024426
UniProt	Q5SQI0	Q8K341
RefSeq (mRNA)	NM_001031722; NM_001190724; NM_001254952; NM_024909; NM_001318762 NM_001318763	NM_001142744; NM_001142745; NM_028476; NM_001347378; NM_001357865
RefSeq (protein)	NP_001026892; NP_001177653; NP_001241881; NP_001305691; NP_001305692 NP_079185	NP_001136216; NP_001136217; NP_001334307; NP_082752; NP_001344794
Location (UCSC)	Chr 6: 30.63 – 30.65 Mb	Chr 17: 35.9 – 35.91 Mb
PubMed search
- Wikidata
View/Edit Human	View/Edit Mouse

In enzymology, an alpha-tubulin N-acetyltransferase (EC 2.3.1.108) is an enzyme which is encoded by the ATAT1 gene.

This enzyme belongs to the family of transferases, specifically those acyltransferases transferring groups other than aminoacyl groups. The systematic name of this enzyme class is acetyl-CoA:[alpha-tubulin]-L-lysine N6-acetyltransferase. Other names in common use include alpha-tubulin acetylase, αTAT, ATAT1, TAT, alpha-TAT, alpha-tubulin acetyltransferase, tubulin N-acetyltransferase, acetyl-CoA:alpha-tubulin-L-lysine N-acetyltransferase, and acetyl-CoA:[alpha-tubulin]-L-lysine 6-N-acetyltransferase. αTAT has a molecular mass of approximately 46.8 kDa.

== Structure ==
=== Primary ===
This protein has a length of 421 amino acids, among which, we have to highlight the Glutamine number 58 (Gln or Q), which is crucial for catalytic activity.

=== Secondary ===
ATAT1 has 8 α-helix, 10 β-strands and one turn. However, only half of the protein has a defined secondary conformation. The rest of this protein is intrinsically disordered.

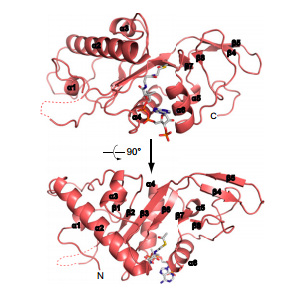
Representation of the crystal structure of human αTAT1-acetyl-CoA complex

=== Domains ===
ATAT1 it is not a modular protein because it only have one domain localized from the first amino acid to the one hundred and ninety.

=== Regions ===
It must be highlighted two important regions of ATAT1 (124-137 and 160-269), because is here where junction points with Acetyl-coA are.

Recently, studies describing the crystal structure of ATAT1 suggest that residues 196 to 236 of human ATAT1 (where acetylated lysines K210 and K221 are located) are disordered and do not contribute significantly to catalytic activity. In contrast, acetylated residues K56 and K146 are both within the catalytic domain (α1 and α3 helices, respectively) and close to the Acetyl CoA binding site, which suggests that these residues might act as an intermediate for the transfer of the acetyl group. However, further structural data with autoacetylation mutants are needed to fully understand this mechanism and to test the possibility of conformational changes caused by ATAT1 autoacetylation.

=== Active site ===
ATAT1 contains a conserved surface pocket close to the active site composed largely of hydrophobic and basic residues, which likely complement the acidic loop containing α-tubulin K40. The protein's active site contains several conserved residues that could potentially function as general bases in the reaction: glutamine 58 (Q58), cysteine (C120), and aspartic acid 157 (D157).

== Isoforms ==
ATAT1 presents seven different isoforms due to alternative splicing, a process which consists in the combination of exons during the end of the transcription process. Consequently, from a single gene more tan one messenger RNA can be produced.

The different isoforms are:

- Isoform 1
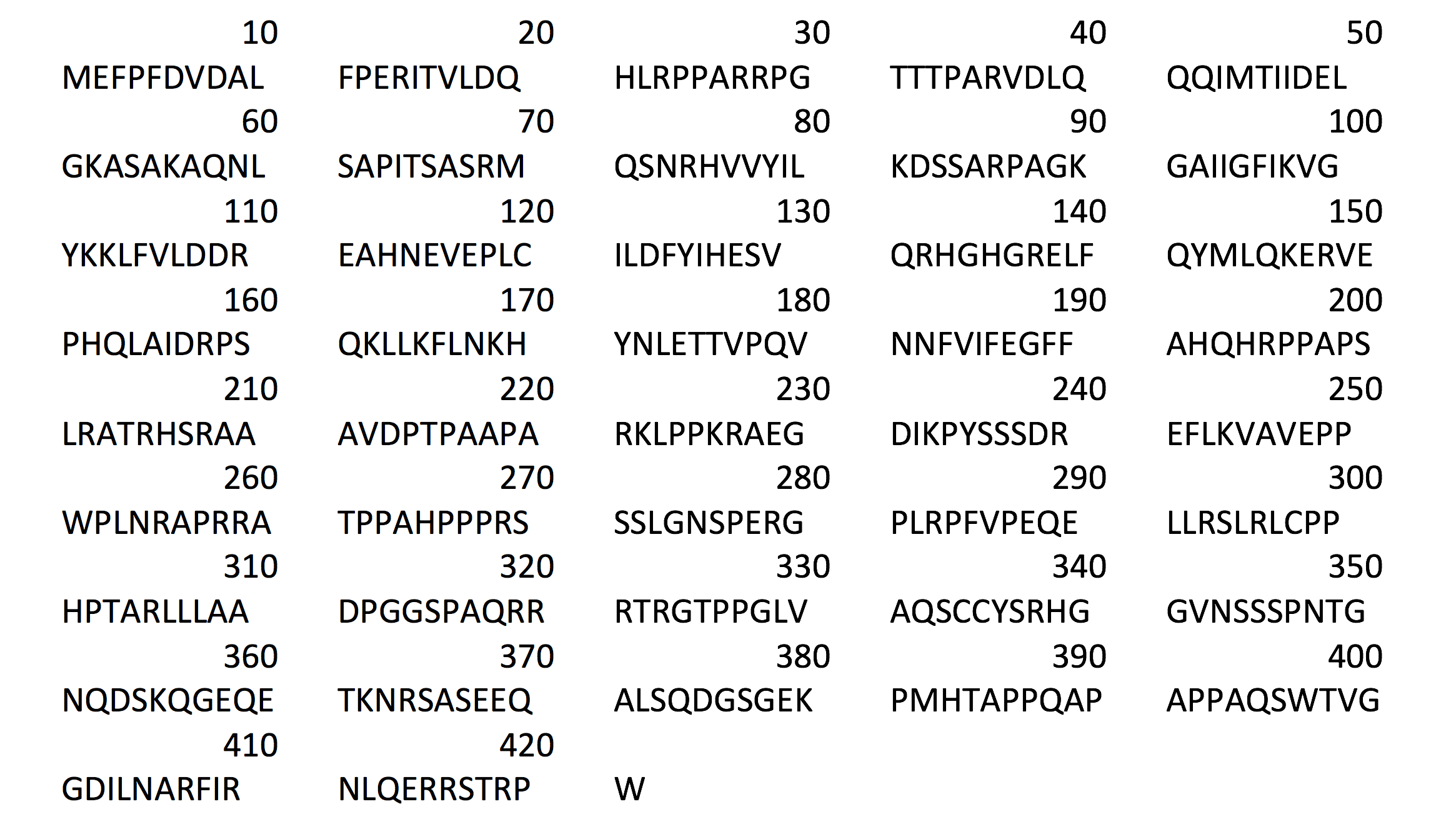
  Primary structure isoform 1

Isoform 1 is known as the canonical sequence. This means that the changes in the other isoforms will be related to this particular sequence of amino acids.

- Isoform 2

Isoform 2 is different from isoform 1, as the sequence of amino acids 1-12 is missing and the sequence from the 13th to the 36th amino acid is charged by the following: MWLTWPFCFLTITLREEGVCHLES

- Isoform 3

Is quite similar to the canonical sequence, the only differences is that the sequence of amino acids in 195th-218th position (RPPAPSLRATRHSRAAAVDPTPAA) is substituted by proline (P).

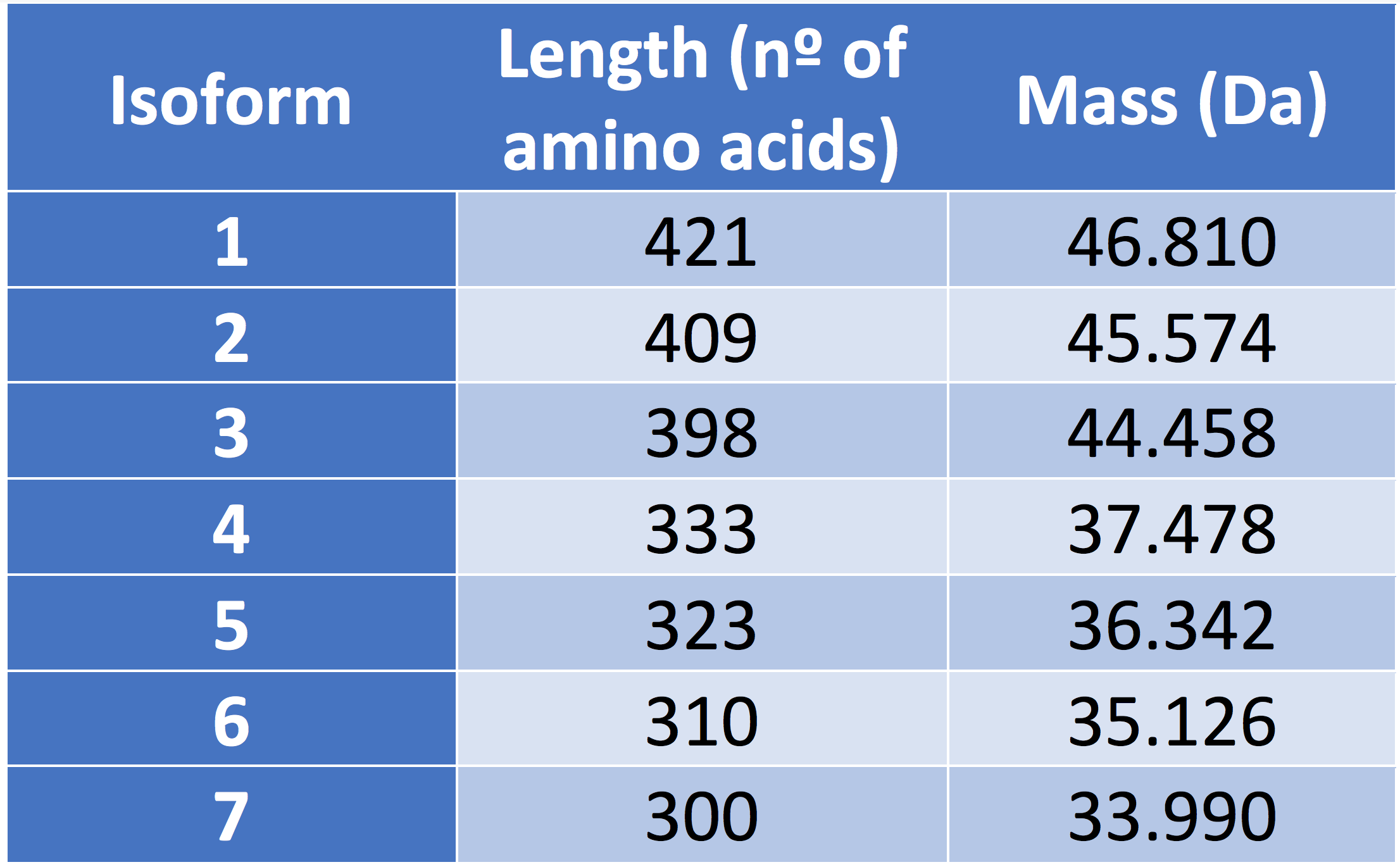
Length and mass of ATAT1's isoforms

- Isoform 4

Isoform 4 is different to the canonical sequence as the sequence of amino acids 323-333 from the canonical chain (RGTPPGLVAQS) has been substituted by a different sequence (SSLPRSEESRY). Additionally, the sequence of amino acids 334-421 is missing.

- Isoform 5

In this case, isoform 5 differs to the canonical sequence as the sequence of amino acids 324-421 has been eliminated.

- Isoform 6

Isoform 6 is probably the isoform which differs the most from the canonical sequence. The sequence of amino acids 195-218 (RPPAPSLRATRHSRAAAVDPTPAA) is substituted by proline (P), just like in the isoform 3; the sequence 323-333 (RGTPPGLVAQS) is changed by (SSLPRSEESRY) and the sequence of amino acids 334-421 is missing, just like in isoform 4.

- Isoform 7

The difference between isoform 7 and the canonical sequence is that the sequence of amino acids in 195th-218th positions (RPPAPSLRATRHSRAAAVDPTPAA) has been changed by proline (P) and also the sequence 334-421 is missing.

== Molecular function ==
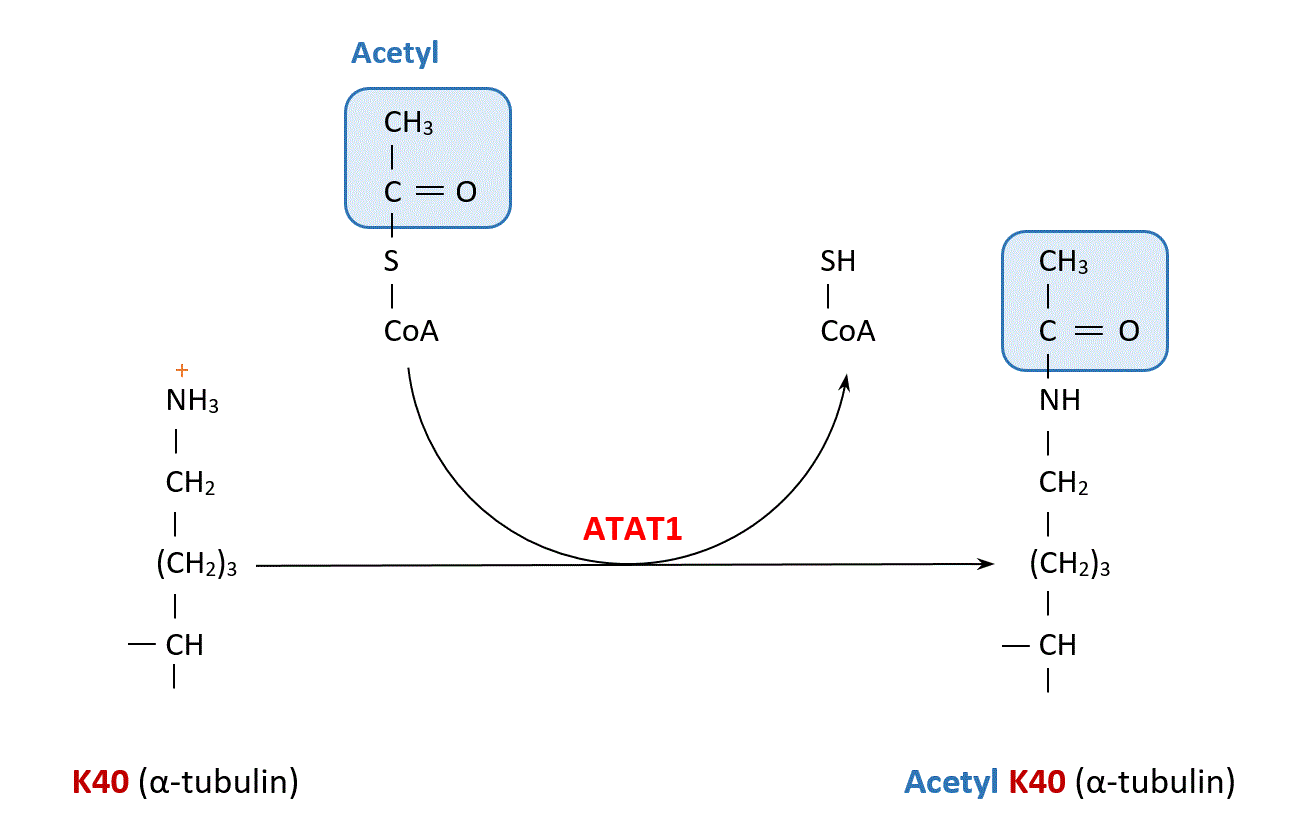
Acetylation reaction of the K40 lysine in alpha-tubulin, catalyzed by ATAT1. The acetyl group of Acetyl-CoA is transferred to the lysine.

Microtubules are highly dynamic tubular polymers assembled from protofilaments of α/β-tubulin dimers, and are essential for intracellular transport, architectural organization, cell division, cellular morphogenesis and force production in eukaryotic cells. There is a constant modulation of the balance between dynamic short-lived, and stable long-lived microtubule subpopulations in the cell.

Although microtubules usually function as dynamic polymers, for some specific functions they require more stability. The acetylation is used y the cell as a marker for these stable microtubules.

ATAT1 specifically acetylates ‘Lys-40’ in alpha tubulin on the lumenal side of microtubules. This is the only known posttranslational modification in the microtubule lumen, but it is still unknown how does the enzyme access the lumen.

The two substrates for this enzyme are Acetyl-CoA and α-tubulin-L-lysine.

Despite its similarity to other acetylating enzymes, it catalyses exclusively the tubulin acetylation reaction.

This catalysis occurs when the Acetyl-CoA molecule attached to the enzyme transfers its Acetyl group to the lysine.

This is the reaction catalyzed by ATAT1:

Acetyl-CoA + [alpha-tubulin]-L-lysine $\rightleftharpoons$ CoA + [alpha-tubulin]-N_{6}-acetyl-L-lysine

Several experiments concluded that the acetylation is more efficient in microtubule substrates than in free α/β-tubulin dimers. This is because once the ATAT1 is in the microtubule lumen, it diffuses freely and it has a high effective substrate concentration.

== Biological functions ==
=== Formation of the hippocampus ===
ATAT1 has an important role in the formation of the hippocampus, as it has been found that mice lacking ATAT1 possess a deficient tubulin acetylation and a bulge in the dentate gyrus.

=== Response to stress and signaling pathways ===
Tubulin acetylation by ATAT1 has been shown to be elevated by the cell exposure to UV irradiation, as well as its exposure to chemicals, such H_{2}O_{2} or NaCl.

Tubulin acetylation is one of the signaling pathways for Na^{+} and K^{+}-ATPase activity.

It has been observed that through traction force microscopy experiments, ATAT1 depletion resulted in lower traction force production on 40 kPa substrates. In contrast, overexpression of GFP-ATAT1 increased the traction energies and forces, and also rescued the effect observed on ATAT1 knockdown when astrocytes were plated on 40 kPa.

==== Autophagy ====
Tubulin acetylation is also involved in regulating autophagy. It is required for fusion of autophagosomes with lysosomes. When there is a nutrient deprivation, starvation-induced tubulin hyperacetylation is required for autophagy activation. This is a way activated when the cell is under stress.

=== Neuronal migration and maturation ===
α-tubulin is a target of the Elongator complex and in the regulation of its acetylation underlies the maturation of cortical projection neurons.

=== Sperm flagellar function ===
Acetylation of the microtubules is required for normal sperm flagellar function. ATAT1 suppression in mice causes diminished sperm motility and male infertility.

=== Cell migration ===
Stable microtubules are involved in cell migration processes. Those microtubules need their acetylation. Thus, the ATAT1 enzyme is important in cell migration.

=== Embryo development ===
ATAT1 is quite important in embryo development in Zebrafish. Some authors consider that it may also be critical in embryo development in mammals.

=== Ciliogenesis ===
ATAT 1 plays an important role in the formation of cilia. It is actually being studied that ciliogenesis can have an effect in the development of handedness in homo sapiens. Moreover, Alpha-tubulin N-acetyltransferase is also essential to make sure that the primary cilium assembly can function in a state of normal kinetics.

== Intracellular location and associated functions ==
=== Scientific background ===
In 2010, there was discovered the existence of an α-tubuline N-acetyltransferase, not only in Tetrahymena and Caenorhabditis elegans, but also in mammalian. Additionally, two research groups generated ATAT1-knockout mice, which occasioned mice with a lack of acetylation in many tissues. However, its intracellular distribution was still unclear.

=== Recent discoveries ===
In order to discover the intracellular location of α-tubulin N-acetyltransferase and some of its functions, it was used a microscopy technique, called immunohistochemistry, which allows the differentiation of diverse molecules in a cell by using an antibody and its reaction with a specific antigen (in this case, it was used an antibody called anti-ATAT1 antibody).

In this study, ATAT1 was observed in many tissues and scientifics discovered and were able to suppose some of its functions. This last study allowed to reveal the intracellular distribution of ATAT1 in ciliated cells of some tissues.

=== Location ===
ATAT1 is known to be located in:

==== Trachea ====
It is manly located at the apical region of epithelial cells, but its function is still an enigma.

==== Kidney ====
The immunopositive signal caused by the anti-ATAT1 antibody was observed in epithelial cells of the medullary collecting duct.

==== Retina ====
The α-tubulin N-acetyltransferase is mainly located in photoreceptor cells. Moreover, ATAT1 is thought to be associated not only with the connecting cilia and the axonemes of the outer segment (OS), but also with the entire inner segment (IS) and the entire outer segment (OS). Therefore, it might play an important paper in the intracilial transport of signal proteins during light-sensing signaling in photoreceptor cells.

==== Testis ====
In testis, the antibody was observed in spermatocytes and spermatids, but not in sperm. In spermatocytes, it was also seen that ATAT1 was located around the Golgi apparatus, which indicates that this protein might play an important paper in spermatogenesis.

==== Third ventricle ====
Although it is still unclear the function o ATAT1, it was also found in other tissues such as the third ventricle of the brain, but its specific function is unknown. However, it is considered to play an important role in neurone development.

== Subcellular location ==
Alpha-tubulin N-acetyltransferase is located in several parts of the cell such as in the cytoskeleton, cytoplasm, or the clathrin coated-pit in the membrane. This is closely related to one of its main functions which is the catalysis of microtubule acetylation.

== Mutagenesis and mutations ==
ATAT1 might tend to undergo a process known as mutagenesis according to which, a genetic mutation is produced. This may occur spontaneously or, on the other hand, due to the action of mutagens. It is possible to classify the different results of mutagenesis depending on which of the 421 aminoacids have been changed.

If glutamine (Q), which occupies the 58th position in the sequence of aminoacids is substituted by alanine (A) a loss in the acetyltransferase activity will be produced. The consequence of a mutation in which the isoleucine (I) in 64th place is changed by alanine (A) is a strong reduction in the acetyltransferase activity.

Moreover, there are a series of mutations which cause a reduction of the protein activity. These are:

1. The substitution of phenylalanine (F) by alanine (A) in the 105th position.
2. The substitution of valine (v) by alanine (A) in the 106th position.
3. Leucine (L) by alanine (A) in the 107th position.
4. Aspartic acid (D) by alanine (A) in the 108th position.
5. Glutamic acid (E) by alanine (A) in the 115th and 117th position.

In some cases, this reduction of activity is even stronger such as in the following mutations:

1. Asparagine (N) by alanine (A) in the 182nd position.
2. Phenylalanine (F) by alanine (A) in the 183th position.

There are some mutations which lead to an increase of activity such as:

1. Aspartic acid (D) by alanine (A) in the 109th position
2. Aspartic acid (D) by arginine (R) in the 109th position. It is important to mention that this increase in activity is generally a marginal event.
3. Glutamic acid (E) by alanine (A) in the 111th position. In this case, the increase of activity is regarding the 2-fold.

There are some cases in which the mutation of the gene might cause a reduction in the acetylation of the microtubules. Like for example:

1. Cysteine (C) by alanine (A) in the 120th position.
2. Aspartic acid (D) by glutamic acid (E) in the 157th position.

Nevertheless, not always a mutation due to a substitution of one aminoacid by another one has a particular effect on the activity of the protein. There are some examples in which a mutation doesn't produce a significant variation of the catalytic effect of the protein. These are:

1. Serine (S) by alanine (A) in the 61st position.
2. Glutamic acid (E) by arginine (R) in the 111th position.

== Post Translational Modifications ==
ATAT1 suffers post translational modifications, which are changes in the protein after it has been translated by ribosomes. The amino acids generally affected by these modifications are in position 46, 146, 233, 244, 272, 276, 315. The main effect of this modifications is an increase in the acetylation of tubulin.

== Associated diseases ==
Knockout studies of the mouse enzymes have shown new possible biological functions. Therefore, they have shown some associated diseases, as well.

For example, abnormal levels of acetylation are closely linked to neurological disorders, cancer, heart diseases and other illnesses.

For some of these diseases a possible solution is an increment of the ATAT1 enzyme. For others, an inhibitor of this enzyme is needed to reach the correct level of acetylation.

=== Neurological disorders ===
Pathologically, tubulin acetylation might be connected to several neurological disorders, such as:

- Charcot-Marie-Tooth disease or distal hereditary motor neuropathy
- Joubert syndrome, which affects the cerebellum
- It is although thought to play an important role in Parkinson's disease
- Amyotrophic lateral sclerosis or Lou Gehrid's disease
- Moreover, acetylation by ATAT1 could also be implicated in Alzheimer's disease
- Epilepsy
- Axon injury

However it is still being investigated if these disorders are directly caused by an abnormality level of acetylation done by ATAT1.

Nevertheless, it seems that the only associated disease which can be stated that is caused by a decrease of acetylation caused by ATAT1 is axon injury

=== Cancer ===
An increase of tubulin acetylation done by ATAT1 may play an important role in:

- Head and neck squamous cell carcinoma
- Breast cancer. ATAT1 together with other enzymes with opposite functions like histone deacetylase 6, carry out processes of acetylation and deacetylation and the balance of these two processes contributes to establish the regulation of invasive properties of tumor cells, particularly breast ones.
- Pancreatic cancer
- Neurofibromatosis type 2

=== Inflammation and immunity ===
It has been also slightly demonstrated that an increase of acetylation done by α-tubulin N-acetyltransferase could ease the entrance of virus in the cell.

== See also ==
- Tubulin
- Acetylation
- Protein Isoform
- Post-translational modification
- Microtubules
- Clathrin
