= Glutamine N-acyltransferase =

Identifiers
- EC no.: 2.3.1.68
- CAS no.: 9030-00-6

Databases
- IntEnz: IntEnz view
- BRENDA: BRENDA entry
- ExPASy: NiceZyme view
- KEGG: KEGG entry
- MetaCyc: metabolic pathway
- PRIAM: profile
- PDB structures: RCSB PDB PDBe PDBsum
- Gene Ontology: AmiGO / QuickGO
Search
- PMC: articles
- PubMed: articles
- NCBI: proteins

Glutamine N-acyltransferase (EC 2.3.1.68) is an enzyme that catalyzes the general chemical reaction

L-glutamine + an acyl-CoA $\rightleftharpoons$ N-acyl-L-glutamine + CoA

Phenylacetyl-CoA is a suitable donor and in this case the product is phenylacetylglutamine:

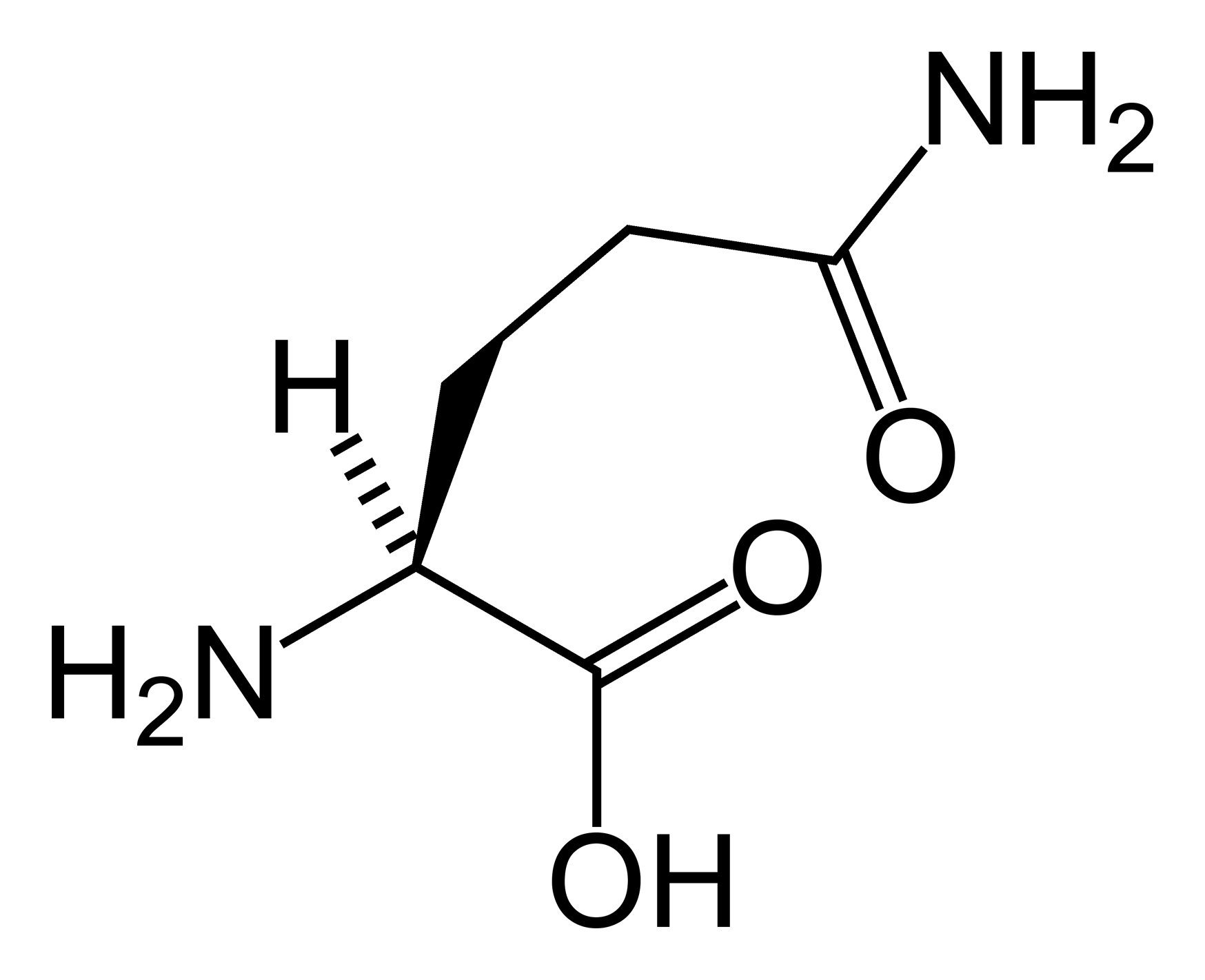
glutamine
+
phenylacetyl-CoA
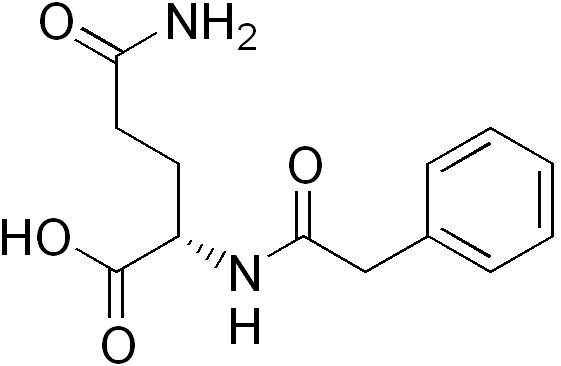
phenylacetylglutamine
+ coenzyme A

This enzyme, characterised from human and monkey liver, belongs to the family of transferases, specifically those acyltransferases transferring groups other than aminoacyl groups. The systematic name of this enzyme class is acyl-CoA:L-glutamine N-acyltransferase.
