= ALS Association =

American nonprofit organization

- Abbreviation: The ALS Association
- Founded: 1985; 41 years ago
- Type: Non-profit
- Purpose: advocacy and patient services
- Location: Washington, D.C., U.S.
- Region served: United States
- President and CEO: Calaneet Balas
- Chairman: Scott Kauffman
- Revenue: $37 million (2019)
- Website: als.org

The ALS Association is an American nonprofit organization that funds global amyotrophic lateral sclerosis (ALS) research, provides care services and programs to people affected by ALS through its nationwide network of clinical care centers, and works with ALS advocates around the country for state and federal policies that serve people living with amyotrophic lateral sclerosis (ALS), also known as Lou Gehrig's disease.

== Research ==
The ALS Association has partnerships with Sean M. Healey & AMG Center for ALS at Massachusetts General Hospital, ALS Finding a Cure, and the Muscular Dystrophy Association. Additionally, the organization is a research partner for Answer ALS (started by Steve Gleason), Target ALS (founded by Dan Doctoroff), and ALS ONE. The organization also provides funding for the ALS Research Forum, a project of Prize4Life, which has since merged with the ALS Association.

Because of the awareness and funding from the Ice Bucket Challenge, the Association committed nearly $90 million in research funding between 2014 and 2018, a 187% increase in its annual research funding. This included $81.2 million across 275 research grants in the U.S. and $8.5 million internationally. The research led to the discovery of five new genes connected to ALS:

- NEK1 - mutations of this gene contribute to both sporadic and familial cases of ALS
- KIF5A - the KIF5A protein functions within neurons to transport materials up and down the axon, a nerve fibre that carries information to muscle cells and is also called the cytoskeleton; the ALS mutation truncates the protein near its end so that the full protein is not made
- C21orf2
- TUBA4A - mutations in this gene destabilize the microtubule network and diminish its repolymerization capability; this is another cytoskeleton defect, like KIF5A
- TBK1

According to Hemali Phatnani, director of the Center for Genomics of Neurodegenerative Disease at the New York Genome Center, funds raised from the Challenge led to the creation of one of the largest resources of ALS whole genome-sequencing data, which has been shared with partners around the world.

In September 2020, the New England Journal of Medicine reported that a new drug combination, AMX0035, was safe and effective at slowing the progression of ALS in a clinically meaningful way. The ALS Association had provided early financial support for research into AMX0035 with Ice Bucket Challenge donations. After the clinical trial outcomes were published, The ALS Association launched a petition asking Amylyx Pharmaceuticals and the Food and Drug Administration to work together to make the drug available to people with ALS as quickly as possible.

=== Leadership and financial accountability ===
Calaneet Balas has served as president and CEO of the ALS Association since December 2017. During her tenure, the organization undertook a controversial national restructuring initiative that resulted in litigation and the departure of 15 independently governed chapters in 2023. The dispute raised concerns about centralized management, financial control, and the preservation of local patient services.

According to the organization's audited financial statements, the ALS Association paid $3.5 million to resolve the dispute with chapters opposing consolidation.

CharityWatch reported total compensation of $529,292 for Balas and $419,528 for Chief Operating Officer Tina Zeff for the fiscal year ending January 31, 2024. The association's tax filings also disclosed a $285,000 severance payment to Zeff.

The restructuring and associated financial expenditures attracted scrutiny of the association's governance and organizational priorities. The association maintained that consolidation would strengthen coordination of research, advocacy, and patient care services.

== Public policy ==
After four years of efforts by thousands of people affected by ALS to cultivate significant bipartisan support, the ALS Disability Access Act of 2019 was signed into law in December 2020. This bill eliminates the arbitrary five-month waiting period formerly required before people living with ALS could draw on their Social Security Disability Insurance benefits.

== The Ice Bucket Challenge ==
In the summer of 2014, the Ice Bucket Challenge raised $220 million after going viral on social media. The ALS Association received $115 million of that amount. To participate, individuals were challenged to pour a bucket of ice water over themselves and/or donate money to ALS research and care. Individuals such as former president George W. Bush, Bill Gates, Taylor Swift, Benedict Cumberbatch, LeBron James, and Martha Stewart dumped ice water on their heads to raise money to fight ALS. In total, about 17 million people uploaded videos of themselves doing the challenge, and the videos were viewed more than 10 billion times.

From the challenge, $115 million was raised, and the Association increased the number of patients served by 28%. Most of the donations were used for research, but there were other uses. For example, local chapters purchased equipment (power wheelchairs, walkers, shower benches, etc.) for ALS patients and were able to provide for everyone on their respective wait-lists.

The Association's clinical network also expanded by 50% as a result of the funding from the Challenge. A study by RTI International reported 29 new ALS Certified Treatment Centers of Excellence, 20 new Recognized Treatment Centers, and 7 new affiliated clinics. Also according to RTI, the National Institutes of Health (NIH) has invested nearly $416 million in ALS Association-funded researchers since the Challenge.

Following the 2014 Ice Bucket Challenge, the ALS Association attempted to trademark the term "ice bucket challenge". Following backlash, the association withdrew the trademark application. In early 2018, a patient group called the "Terminally Persistent" coalition criticized the ALS Association for not spending the $115 million earned from the Ice Bucket Challenge more readily on research. Additionally, the group complained that the organization was not providing funding to BrainStorm Cell Therapeutics, a pharmaceutical company researching treatments for ALS and running Phase III clinical trials; the ALS Association does not fund Phase III clinical trials.

=== Fifteen chapters separated following a legal dispute ===
In 2023, 15 chapters challenged the ALS Association's plan to consolidate its independently governed chapters into a centralized national organization.

The dispute resulted in a settlement allowing the chapters to separate. They subsequently organized under ALS United, maintaining independent local governance and financial management.

Among the departing organizations were ALS Arizona, ALS United Greater New York, ALS United North Carolina, ALS United Mid-Atlantic, and ALS Network (formerly Golden West).

This is substantiated by STAT, Bloomberg Law, and The NonProfit Times. STAT+2

== Organizational restructuring and chapter departures ==
In 2021, the ALS Association began a restructuring initiative intended to consolidate its independently governed chapters into a single national organization. The proposal generated opposition from several chapters concerned about the loss of local governance, control of charitable assets, and the potential consequences for community-based patient services.

In January 2023, a group of chapters filed litigation in Delaware challenging the proposed consolidation. The dispute received national coverage, including reporting by STAT and Bloomberg Law, which described disagreements over organizational governance, financial control, and priorities for serving people living with ALS.

In June 2023, the ALS Association announced a settlement permitting 15 chapters to separate from the national organization. The separation became effective September 1, 2023. The departing organizations included chapters serving Arizona, California, Connecticut, Georgia, Illinois, Nevada, New Mexico, New York, North Carolina, Ohio, Oregon, Pennsylvania, Rhode Island, and the Rocky Mountain region.

In 2025, the former chapters formally established ALS United, an alliance of 15 independently governed organizations. The alliance maintains local financial and operational autonomy while coordinating patient services, advocacy, and research initiatives.

The ALS Association defended its consolidation initiative as an effort to improve national coordination and accelerate progress in ALS research and care. Opposing chapters maintained that independent local governance was essential to meeting the needs of their communities. The local chapters are the ones that actually provide support to people living with ALS.

== Charity ratings and financial accountability ==
Independent charity evaluators have reported differing assessments of the ALS Association.

In May 2025, CharityWatch assigned the ALS Association's national office a B− rating based on financial information for the fiscal year ending January 31, 2024. CharityWatch calculated that 66% of the organization's cash expenditures were directed toward programs, with approximately $20 spent on fundraising for every $100 in contributions.

Charity Navigator, which uses a different evaluation methodology, awarded the organization a four-star rating and an overall score of 95%.

The organization's restructuring also carried financial implications. According to financial statements cited by CharityWatch, the ALS Association paid $3.5 million to settle the dispute with chapters that declined to participate in the consolidation.

== Criticism and research outcomes ==
The ALS Association has faced criticism regarding the allocation of research funding and its advocacy priorities.

In 2018, the Terminally Persistent patient coalition criticized the pace at which the association was spending funds generated by the 2014 Ice Bucket Challenge. The coalition also questioned the organization's research funding priorities.

The association provided early research funding for AMX0035, subsequently marketed as Relyvrio, and advocated for its regulatory approval. Although the FDA approved the drug in 2022, the manufacturer voluntarily withdrew it from the United States and Canadian markets in April 2024 after a confirmatory Phase 3 clinical trial failed to demonstrate clinical benefit.

The ALS Association defended its earlier advocacy, citing the preliminary clinical evidence available at the time and the urgent unmet medical needs of people living with ALS.

== Awareness and fundraising ==
The association's signature fundraising event each year is the "Walk to Defeat ALS". This event is held each fall through spring in cities across the United States. Since its inception in 2000, this event has raised more than $265 million.
