= Sodium phenylbutyrate =

Chemical compound

Clinical data
- Trade names: Buphenyl, Pheburane, Ammonaps, others
- AHFS/Drugs.com: Micromedex Detailed Consumer Information
- License data: US DailyMed: Sodium phenylbutyrate
- Pregnancy category: AU: B3
- Routes of administration: By mouth
- ATC code: A16AX03 (WHO)

Legal status
- Legal status: AU: S4 (Prescription only); CA: ℞-only; US: ℞-only; EU: Rx-only; In general: ℞ (Prescription only)

Pharmacokinetic data
- Metabolism: Liver and kidney to phenylacetic acid
- Elimination half-life: 0.8 hours (phenylbutyrate), 1.15-1.29 hours (phenylacetate)
- Excretion: Urine (80-100% as phenylacetylglutamine)

Identifiers
- IUPAC name: Sodium 4-phenylbutanoate
- CAS Number: 1716-12-7
- PubChem CID: 5258
- DrugBank: DBSALT002404
- ChemSpider: 5068
- UNII: NT6K61736T
- KEGG: D05868
- ChEBI: CHEBI:75316
- ChEMBL: ChEMBL1746
- CompTox Dashboard (EPA): DTXSID7040948
- ECHA InfoCard: 100.130.318

Chemical and physical data
- Formula: C_{10}H_{11}NaO_{2}
- Molar mass: 186.186 g·mol^{−1}
- 3D model (JSmol): Interactive image
- SMILES: [Na+].[O-]C(=O)CCCC1=CC=CC=C1
- InChI: InChI=1S/C10H12O2.Na/c11-10(12)8-4-7-9-5-2-1-3-6-9;/h1-3,5-6H,4,7-8H2,(H,11,12);/q;+1/p-1; Key:VPZRWNZGLKXFOE-UHFFFAOYSA-M

Sodium phenylbutyrate, sold under the brand name Buphenyl among others, is a salt of an aromatic fatty acid, 4-phenylbutyrate (4-PBA) or 4-phenylbutyric acid. The compound is used to treat urea cycle disorders, because its metabolites offer an alternative pathway to the urea cycle to allow excretion of excess nitrogen.

Sodium phenylbutyrate is also a histone deacetylase inhibitor and chemical chaperone, leading respectively to research into its use as an anti-cancer agent and in protein misfolding diseases such as cystic fibrosis.

== Structure and properties ==
Sodium phenylbutyrate is a sodium salt of an aromatic fatty acid, made up of an aromatic ring and butyric acid. The chemical name for sodium phenylbutyrate is 4-phenylbutyric acid, sodium salt. It forms water-soluble off-white crystals.

== Uses ==
=== Medical uses ===
Sodium phenylbutyrate is taken orally or by nasogastric intubation as a tablet or powder, and tastes very salty and bitter. It treats urea cycle disorders, genetic diseases in which nitrogen waste builds up in the blood plasma as ammonia glutamine (a state called hyperammonemia) due to deficiences in the enzymes carbamoyl phosphate synthetase I, ornithine transcarbamylase, or argininosuccinic acid synthetase. Uncontrolled, this causes intellectual impairment and early death. Sodium phenylbutyrate metabolites allows the kidneys to excrete excess nitrogen in place of urea, and coupled with dialysis, amino acid supplements and a protein-restricted diet, children born with urea cycle disorders can usually survive beyond 12 months. Patients may need treatment for all their life. The treatment was introduced by researchers in the 1990s, and approved by the U.S. Food and Drugs Administration (FDA) in April 1996.

==== Adverse effects ====
Nearly 1/4 of women may experience an adverse effect of amenorrhea or menstrual dysfunction. Appetite loss is seen in 4% of patients. Body odor due to metabolization of phenylbutyrate affects 3% of patients, and 3% experience unpleasant tastes. Gastrointestinal symptoms and mostly mild indications of neurotoxicity are also seen in less than 2% of patients, among several other reported adverse effects. Administration during pregnancy is not recommended because sodium phenylbutyrate treatment could mimic maternal phenylketonuria due to the production of phenylalanine, potentially causing fetal brain damage.

=== Research ===
==== Urea cycle disorders ====
Sodium phenylbutyrate administration was discovered to lead to an alternative nitrogen disposal pathway by Dr. Saul Brusilow, Mark Batshaw and colleagues at the Johns Hopkins School of Medicine in the early 1980s, due to some serendipitous discoveries. They had studied ketoacid therapy for another inborn error of metabolism, citrullinemia, in the late 1970s and they noticed that arginine treatment led to an increase of nitrogen in the urine and a drop in ammonia in the blood. The researchers spoke to Norman Radin about this finding, and he remembered a 1914 article on using sodium benzoate to reduce urea excretion. Another 1919 article had used sodium phenylacetate, and so the researchers treated five patients with hyperammonemia with benzoate and phenylacetate and published a report in Science. In 1982 and 1984, the researchers published on using benzoate and arginine for urea cycle disorders in the NEJM. Use of sodium phenylbutyrate was introduced in the early 1990s, as it lacks the odor of phenylacetate.

==== Chemical chaperone ====
In cystic fibrosis, a point mutation in the Cystic Fibrosis Transmembrane Conductance Regulator protein, ΔF508-CFTR, causes it to be unstable and misfold, hence trapped in the endoplasmic reticulum and unable to reach the cell membrane. This lack of CFTR in the cell membrane leads to disrupted chloride transport and the symptoms of cystic fibrosis. Sodium phenylbutyrate can act as a chemical chaperone, stabilising the mutant CFTR in the endoplasmic reticulum and allowing it to reach the cell surface.

==== Histone deacetylase inhibitor ====
Deriving from its activity as a histone deacetylase inhibitor, sodium phenylbutyrate is under investigation for use as a potential differentiation-inducing agent in malignant glioma and acute myeloid leukaemia, and also for the treatment of some sickle-cell disorders as an alternative to hydroxycarbamide due to it inducing expression of fetal hemoglobin to replace missing adult hemoglobin. While small-scale investigation is proceeding, there is to date no published data to support the use of the compound in the clinical treatment of cancer, and it remains under limited investigation. Sodium phenylbutyrate is also being studied as a therapeutic option for the treatment of Huntington's disease.

Sodium phenylbutyrate was under development for the treatment of Alzheimer's disease. It reached phase 2 clinical trials for this indication. However, development was discontinued in 2015. Subsequently, sodium phenylbutyrate/ursodoxicoltaurine was developed for a variety of indications including treatment of amyotrophic lateral sclerosis (ALS), Wolfram syndrome, Friedreich's ataxia, and progressive supranuclear palsy.

==== Other ====
Phenylbutyrate has been associated with longer lifespans in Drosophila.

University of Colorado researchers Curt Freed and Wenbo Zhou demonstrated that phenylbutyrate stops the progression of Parkinson's disease in mice by turning on a gene called DJ-1 that can protect dopaminergic neurons in the midbrain from dying. As of July 2011 they plan on testing phenylbutyrate for the treatment of Parkinson's disease in humans.

== Pharmacology ==
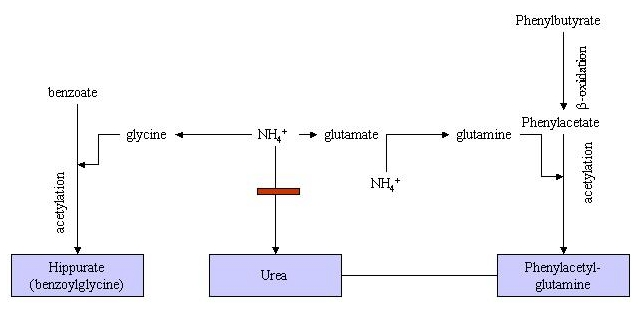
Nitrogen elimination by phenylbutyrate metabolites

Phenylbutyrate is a prodrug. In the human body it is first converted to phenylbutyryl-CoA and then metabolized by mitochondrial beta-oxidation, mainly in the liver and kidneys, to the active form, phenylacetate. Phenylacetate conjugates with glutamine to phenylacetylglutamine, which is eliminated with the urine. It contains the same amount of nitrogen as urea, which makes it an alternative to urea for excreting nitrogen.

Sodium phenylbutyrate taken by mouth can be detected in the blood within fifteen minutes, and reaches peak concentration in the bloodstream within an hour. It is metabolized into phenylacetate within half an hour.

== See also ==
- Histone deacetylase inhibitor
- Ammonia scavenger
- Glycerol phenylbutyrate
- Sodium butyrate
