= Phenylacetyl-CoA 1,2-epoxidase =

Class of enzymes

Identifiers
- EC no.: 1.14.13.149

Databases
- IntEnz: IntEnz view
- BRENDA: BRENDA entry
- ExPASy: NiceZyme view
- KEGG: KEGG entry
- MetaCyc: metabolic pathway
- PRIAM: profile
- PDB structures: RCSB PDB PDBe PDBsum
Search
- PMC: articles
- PubMed: articles
- NCBI: proteins

Phenylacetyl-CoA 1,2-epoxidase (EC 1.14.13.149, ring 1,2-phenylacetyl-CoA epoxidase, phenylacetyl-CoA monooxygenase, PaaAC, PaaABC(D)E) is an enzyme with systematic name phenylacetyl-CoA:oxygen oxidoreductase (1,2-epoxidizing). This enzyme catalyses the following chemical reaction

phenylacetyl-CoA + NADPH + H^{+} + O_{2} $\rightleftharpoons$ 2-(1,2-epoxy-1,2-dihydrophenyl)acetyl-CoA + NADP^{+} + H_{2}O

Phenylacetyl-CoA 1,2-epoxidase participates in catabolism of phenylacetate in Escherichia coli and Pseudomonas putida.
