= Glycerol phenylbutyrate =

Chemical compound

Clinical data
- Trade names: Ravicti
- Other names: Glyceryl phenylbutyrate; GPB; GT4P; HPN-100; HPN100
- AHFS/Drugs.com: Micromedex Detailed Consumer Information
- License data: US DailyMed: Glycerol phenylbutyrate
- Routes of administration: Oral
- Drug class: Histone deacetylase inhibitor; Ammonia scavenger
- ATC code: A16AX09 (WHO)

Legal status
- Legal status: CA: ℞-only; US: ℞-only; EU: Rx-only

Pharmacokinetic data
- Metabolites: • Phenylbutyric acid • Phenylacetic acid • Phenylacetylglutamine
- Elimination half-life: Unknown (very rapid)

Identifiers
- IUPAC name: 1,2,3-propanetriyl tris(4-phenylbutanoate)
- CAS Number: 611168-24-2
- PubChem CID: 10482134
- DrugBank: DB08909
- ChemSpider: 8657541
- UNII: ZH6F1VCV7B
- KEGG: D10127
- ChEMBL: ChEMBL2105745
- CompTox Dashboard (EPA): DTXSID40210005
- ECHA InfoCard: 100.228.552

Chemical and physical data
- Formula: C_{33}H_{38}O_{6}
- Molar mass: 530.661 g·mol^{−1}
- 3D model (JSmol): Interactive image
- SMILES: C1=CC=C(C=C1)CCCC(=O)OCC(COC(=O)CCCC2=CC=CC=C2)OC(=O)CCCC3=CC=CC=C3
- InChI: InChI=1S/C33H38O6/c34-31(22-10-19-27-13-4-1-5-14-27)37-25-30(39-33(36)24-12-21-29-17-8-3-9-18-29)26-38-32(35)23-11-20-28-15-6-2-7-16-28/h1-9,13-18,30H,10-12,19-26H2; Key:ZSDBFLMJVAGKOU-UHFFFAOYSA-N

Glycerol phenylbutyrate (INN, USAN), sold under the brand name Ravicti, is a nitrogen-binding agent medication used for chronic management of certain urea cycle disorders. The medication reduces the harmful buildup of ammonia in the body. It functions as a prodrug of phenylbutyric acid, which conjugates with glutamine to form phenylacetylglutamine, facilitating ammonia excretion via the kidneys

It was developed by Hyperion Therapeutics based on the existing medication sodium phenylbutyrate, and received FDA approval in February 2013.

== Medical uses ==
Glycerol phenylbutyrate is indicated for chronic management of people with inborn urea cycle disorders who cannot be managed by dietary protein restriction and/or amino acid supplementation alone.

== Pharmacology ==
=== Pharmacodynamics ===
Glycerol phenylbutyrate is an ammonia scavenger. It is a prodrug of phenylbutyric acid (phenylbutyrate), which acts by binding to nitrogen and conjugating with glutamine (which contains nitrogen) via acetylation to form phenylacetylglutamine (PAGN). In addition to its ammonia-scavenging activity, phenylbutyric acid is a histone deacetylase (HDAC) inhibitor.

=== Pharmacokinetics ===
The elimination half-life of glycerol phenylbutyrate is unknown or not described. It is very rapidly hydrolyzed into phenylbutyric acid (PBA; phenylbutyrate) in vitro and unchanged glycerol phenylbutyrate is undetectable in blood in vivo. One study, in people with cirrhosis, found that the half-lives of glycerol phenylbutyrate's metabolites were 1.9 hours (range 0.8–7.4 hours) for phenylbutyric acid, 1.0–1.8 hours for phenylacetic acid (PAA), and 1.9–16.9 hours for phenylacetylglutamine (PAGN).

== Chemistry ==
=== Analogues ===
Analogues of glycerol phenylbutyrate include phenylbutyric acid (phenylbutyrate), tributyrin (glycerol tributyrate), and glyceryl-tris-3-hydroxybutyrate (3GHB), among others.

== History ==
Glycerol phenylbutyrate was first approved for medical use in the United States in 2013.

== Society and culture ==
=== Economics ===
Hyperion has been criticized for setting a high price for the drug. The price was set at US$250,000–290,000. In 2014, the drug generated $30.8 million in net sales, far behind the older and less expensive Buphenyl ($113.6 million in sales).

=== Patents ===
While GPB is the subject of several patents related to its synthesis, formulation, and therapeutic monitoring, the core patent covering its composition and use in treating UCDs is US 5,968,979. Subsequent patents build on this foundation, focusing on manufacturing improvements, dosing methods, and related applications. Below is a summary of key issued US patents explicitly addressing GPB's use in UCDs, based on patent database records. Note that patents often cover broader nitrogen retention disorders, including UCDs as a primary indication.

=== Issued US patents ===
Patent Number	Title	Issue date	Assignee/Inventor	Summary of Relevance to UCD Treatment
US 5,968,979	Glycerol ester derivatives	October 19, 1999	Children's Medical Center Corp. (Boston, MA); Saul W. Brusilow, Marshall L. Summar	Foundational patent for GPB (glyceryl tri-(4-phenylbutyrate) or HPN-100) as a nitrogen-scavenging agent. Claims methods for treating UCDs by administering GPB to reduce hyperammonemia, with dosages of 5–10 g/m²/day. Enabled FDA approval in 2013."Ravicti Label" (PDF). U.S. Food and Drug Administration.
US 9,914,692	Procedure for the preparation of 4-phenyl butyrate and uses thereof	March 13, 2018	Horizon Therapeutics Ireland DAC; Bruce A. Bloom, Mitchell L. Chan	Describes synthesis of 4-phenylbutyric acid (GPB precursor) via oxidation of 4-phenyl-1-butanol. Claims use of GPB in treating UCDs and hepatic encephalopathy, emphasizing >99% purity for ammonia control.
US 10,045,959	Methods of therapeutic monitoring of nitrogen scavenging drugs	August 14, 2018	Horizon Therapeutics USA, Inc.; Jeffrey L. Gelfand, Bruce A. Bloom	Covers methods to monitor and adjust GPB dosing in UCD patients using fasting ammonia levels. Includes dose titration algorithms to maintain ammonia <0.5 mmol/L, improving long-term management.
US 9,999,608	Methods of therapeutic monitoring of nitrogen scavenging drugs	June 19, 2018	Horizon Therapeutics USA, Inc.; Jeffrey L. Gelfand, Bruce A. Bloom	Continuation of US 10,045,959, focusing on predictive modeling of ammonia exposure to prevent hyperammonemic crises in UCD patients, with clinical data from pediatric and adult cohorts.

Additional Notes Patent Expiry: US 5,968,979 expired in 2018, potentially allowing generic GPB formulations by late 2025. Later patents (e.g., US 9,914,692) extend protection for synthesis methods until ~2035–2038."Ravicti Patent Expirations". Deep knowledge on small-molecule drugs and the global patents covering them. DrugPatentWatch. 6 August 2026. Related Patents: International patents (e.g., WO 2015/063659) and pending US applications (e.g., US 2021/0114996 for RNA-modulating therapies) mention GPB but are not issued US patents. Clinical Context: These patents supported trials showing GPB reduces ammonia by ~30% compared to sodium phenylbutyrate, leading to FDA approval for patients ≥2 months.

=== Additional Notes ===
Scope and Expiry: US 5,968,979 expired in 2018, aligning with the entry of generic GPB formulations expected by late 2025. Later patents (e.g., US 9,914,692) extend protection for manufacturing processes, potentially affecting generics until around 2035-2038. Related but Non-US or Pending: International equivalents (e.g., WO 2015/063659 for GPB synthesis) and US applications (e.g., US 2021/0114996 for RNA-modulating therapies in UCDs mentioning GPB) exist but are not issued US patents. Clinical Context: These patents supported pivotal trials (e.g., phase 3 studies showing GPB reduces ammonia by 30% vs. sodium phenylbutyrate) leading to FDA approval for all ages ≥2 months.

== Research ==
Glycerol phenylbutyrate was developed by Ucyclyd Pharma, Horizon Pharma, and other organizations. In addition to inborn urea cycle disorders, it is under development for the treatment of cystic fibrosis. As of February 2026, the drug is in 1/2 clinical trials for this indication. Glycerol phenylbutyrate was also under development for the treatment of hepatic encephalopathy, but development for this use was discontinued.
