= Glutamine N-phenylacetyltransferase =

Enzyme

Identifiers
- EC no.: 2.3.1.14
- CAS no.: 9030-00-6

Databases
- IntEnz: IntEnz view
- BRENDA: BRENDA entry
- ExPASy: NiceZyme view
- KEGG: KEGG entry
- MetaCyc: metabolic pathway
- PRIAM: profile
- PDB structures: RCSB PDB PDBe PDBsum
- Gene Ontology: AmiGO / QuickGO
Search
- PMC: articles
- PubMed: articles
- NCBI: proteins

Glutamine N-phenylacetyltransferase (EC 2.3.1.14) is an enzyme that catalyzes the chemical reaction

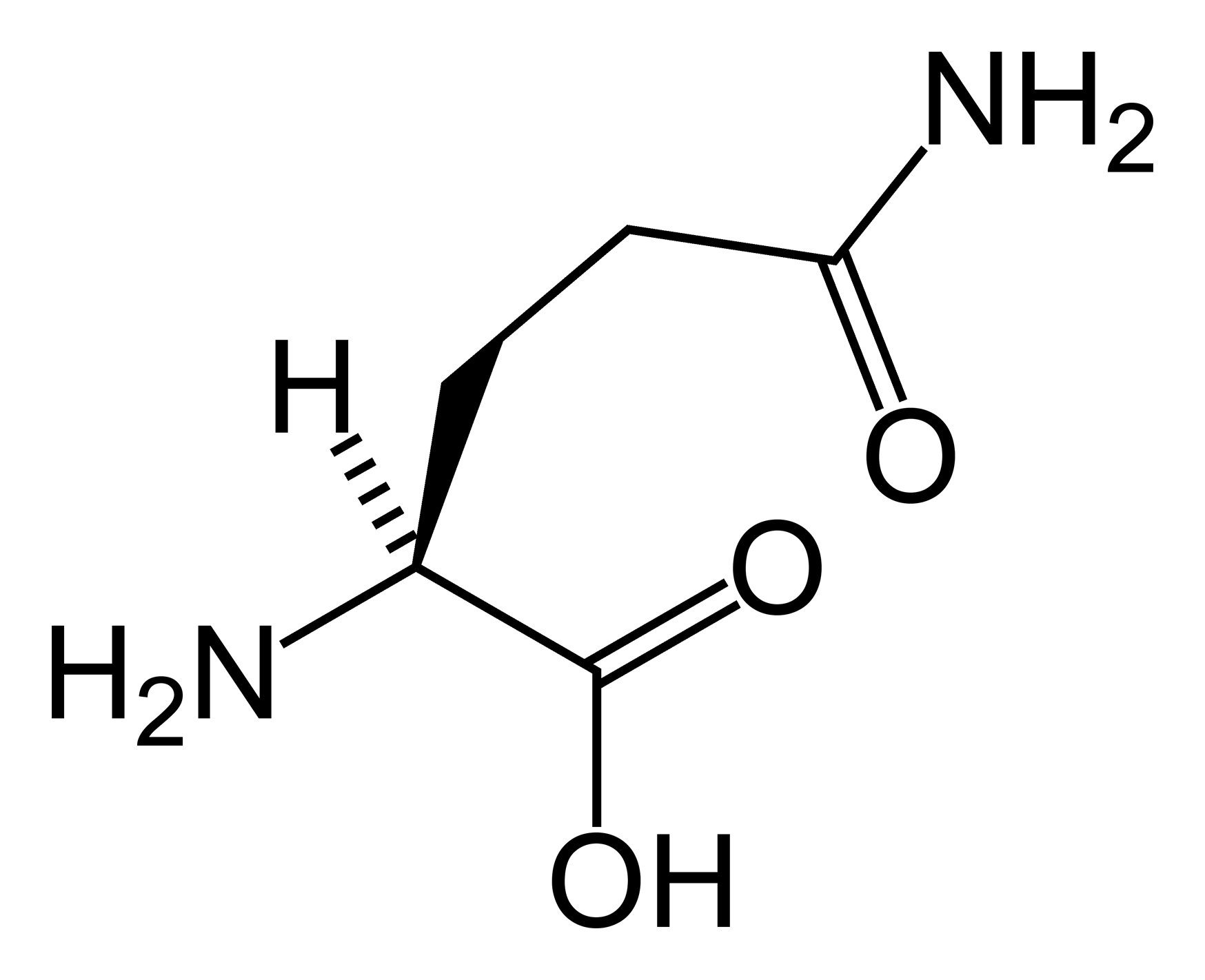
glutamine
+
phenylacetyl-CoA
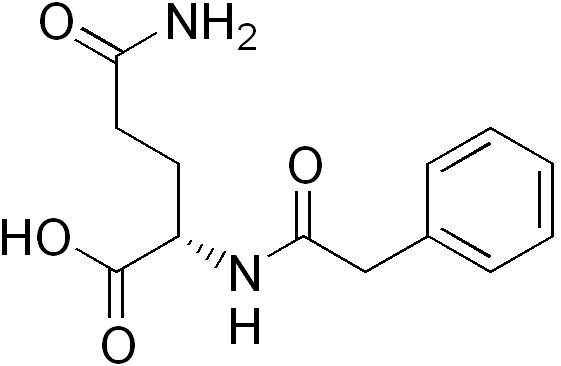
phenylacetylglutamine
+ coenzyme A

The two substrates of this enzyme are glutamine and phenylacetyl-CoA. Its products are phenylacetylglutamine and coenzyme A.

This enzyme belongs to the family of transferases, specifically those acyltransferases transferring groups other than aminoacyl groups. The systematic name of this enzyme class is phenylacetyl-CoA:L-glutamine alpha-N-phenylacetyltransferase. Other names in common use include glutamine phenylacetyltransferase, and phenylacetyl-CoA:L-glutamine N-acetyltransferase. It participates in tyrosine metabolism and phenylalanine metabolism.
