= Phenylacetate decarboxylase =

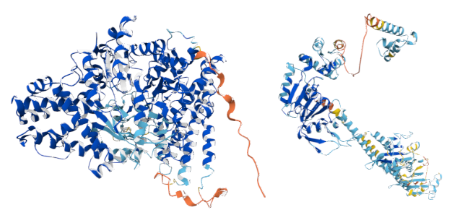
- Phenylacetate decarboxylase (left) and its activator (right), as folded by AlphaFold

Identifiers
- EC no.: 4.1.1.119

Databases
- IntEnz: IntEnz view
- BRENDA: BRENDA entry
- ExPASy: NiceZyme view
- KEGG: KEGG entry
- MetaCyc: metabolic pathway
- PRIAM: profile
- PDB structures: RCSB PDB PDBe PDBsum
Search
- PMC: articles
- PubMed: articles
- NCBI: proteins

Phenylacetate decarboxylase is a carboxy-lyase enzyme. The enzyme was isolated from anoxic toluene-producing microbial communities. It is a glycyl radical enzyme. It requires activation through a dedicated cognate activating enzyme (encoded by PhdA). The cognate activase catalyses the reductive lysing of S-Adenosyl methionine which yields a 5'-deoxyadenosyl radical that allows the production of the glycyl radical. The enzyme catalyzes the following reaction:

Phenylacetate + H^{+} = Toluene + CO2

The enzyme is involved in various biosynthetic and bio-catabolic pathways, including the toluene production pathway, phenylacetate degradation pathway and biosynthetic pathway of select other aromatic compounds in toluene (and other aromatic carbon) producing bacterial species.
