= Amylyx Pharmaceuticals =

American biopharmaceutical company

- Company type: Public
- Traded as: Nasdaq: AMLX
- ISIN: US03237H1014
- Industry: Pharmaceuticals
- Founded: 2013; 12 years ago
- Founder: Joshua Cohen; Justin Klee
- Headquarters: Cambridge, Massachusetts
- Key people: Joshua Cohen; Justin Klee
- Website: www.amylyx.com

Amylyx Pharmaceuticals, Inc is a biopharmaceutical company headquartered in Cambridge, Massachusetts. Amylyx is best known for AMX0035, an experimental therapy for amyotrophic lateral sclerosis. AMX0035 was approved for medical use in Canada as Albrioza, in June 2022, and in the United States, as Relyvrio, in September 2022. It was withdrawn in April, 2024.

== History ==
Amylyx Pharmaceuticals was founded in 2013 by Joshua Cohen and Justin Klee when the two were undergraduate students at Brown University. The two proposed that taurursodiol and sodium phenylbutyrate together might prevent dysfunction of mitochondria and the endoplasmic reticulum, safeguarding neurons. Klee and Cohen were advised by Rudolph E. Tanzi, who ultimately served as the founding chair of Amylyx's scientific research board. After Klee and Cohen were able to achieve strong results in pre-clinical research, Tanzi connected the two to his colleagues at Massachusetts General Hospital, which culminated in clinical trials and FDA approval. The company was granted $2.2 million by the ALS Association with funds raised through the Ice Bucket Challenge.

Amylyx went public in January 2022. The company's shares began trading on the Nasdaq on January 7, 2022 under the symbol AMLX.

After a disappointing Phase 3 trial of AMX0035 failed to produce significant differences versus a placebo, on April 4, 2024 Amylyx announced they would begin the process of withdrawing Albrioza and Relyviro from the North American market. Amylyx received praise for keeping its pre-approval promise to stop selling the drug if it turned out to be ineffective, an unusually ethical move which the FDA rarely requires. The company cited its independence from major pharmaceutical companies as a reason it could do so.
