= Phenylacetate—CoA ligase =

Identifiers
- EC no.: 6.2.1.30
- CAS no.: 57219-71-3

Databases
- IntEnz: IntEnz view
- BRENDA: BRENDA entry
- ExPASy: NiceZyme view
- KEGG: KEGG entry
- MetaCyc: metabolic pathway
- PRIAM: profile
- PDB structures: RCSB PDB PDBe PDBsum
- Gene Ontology: AmiGO / QuickGO
Search
- PMC: articles
- PubMed: articles
- NCBI: proteins

In enzymology, a phenylacetate—CoA ligase is an enzyme (EC 6.2.1.30) that catalyzes the chemical reaction

ATP + phenylacetate + CoA $\rightleftharpoons$ AMP + diphosphate + phenylacetyl-CoA

The 3 substrates of this enzyme are ATP, phenylacetate, and CoA. Its 3 products are AMP, diphosphate, and phenylacetyl-CoA.

This enzyme belongs to the family of ligases, specifically those forming carbon-sulfur bonds as acid-thiol ligases. The systematic name of this enzyme class is phenylacetate:CoA ligase (AMP-forming). Other names in common use include phenylacetyl-CoA ligase, PA-CoA ligase, and phenylacetyl-CoA ligase (AMP-forming). This enzyme participates in tyrosine metabolism and phenylalanine metabolism.
