= N-Acetylglutamate synthase =

Enzyme found in humans

NAGS

Identifiers
- Aliases: NAGS, AGAS, ARGA, N-acetylglutamate synthase
- External IDs: OMIM: 608300; MGI: 2387600; GeneCards: NAGS
Available structures
PDB	Ortholog search: PDBe RCSB
PDB	List of PDB id codes 4K30
Enzyme activity
EC #	BRENDA	ExPASy	KEGG	MetaCyc
2.3.1.1	↗	↗	↗	↗

Gene location (Human)
Chr.	Chromosome 17 (human)
Band	17q21.31	Start	44,004,622 bp
Band	17q21.31	End	44,009,068 bp

Gene location (Mouse)
Chr.	Chromosome 11 (mouse)
Band	11|11 D	Start	102,036,339 bp
Band	11|11 D	End	102,040,303 bp
RNA expression pattern
Bgee	Human / Mouse (ortholog); Top expressed in: mucosa of ileum; right lobe of liver; jejunal mucosa; gonad; duodenum; mucosa of transverse colon; human kidney; right lobe of thyroid gland; left lobe of thyroid gland; granulocyte / Top expressed in: left lobe of liver; jejunum; duodenum; epithelium of small intestine; ileum; embryo; blastocyst; intestinal villus; embryo; crypt of lieberkuhn of small intestine; More reference expression data
BioGPS	n/a
Gene ontology
Molecular function	transferase activity; arginine binding; acyltransferase activity; acetylglutamate kinase activity; acetyl-CoA:L-glutamate N-acetyltransferase activity; methione N-acyltransferase activity
Cellular component	mitochondrial matrix; mitochondrion
Biological process	urea cycle; glutamate metabolic process; arginine biosynthetic process; phosphorylation
Sources:Amigo / QuickGO
Orthologs
Databases	NCBI: entry; OMA: entry
Species	Human	Mouse
Entrez	162417	217214
Ensembl	ENSG00000161653	ENSMUSG00000048217
UniProt	Q8N159	Q8R4H7
RefSeq (mRNA)	NM_153006	NM_145829; NM_178053
RefSeq (protein)	NP_694551	NP_665828
Location (UCSC)	Chr 17: 44 – 44.01 Mb	Chr 11: 102.04 – 102.04 Mb
PubMed search
- Wikidata
View/Edit Human	View/Edit Mouse

N-Acetylglutamate synthase (NAGS) is an enzyme in humans is encoded by the gene NAGS. It catalyses the production of N-acetylglutamate (NAG) from glutamate and acetyl-CoA.

Put simply NAGS catalyzes the following reaction:

acetyl-CoA + L-glutamate → CoA + N-acetyl-L-glutamate

NAGS, a member of the N-acetyltransferase family of enzymes, is present in both prokaryotes and eukaryotes, although its role and structure differ widely depending on the species. NAG can be used in the production of ornithine and arginine, two important amino acids, or as an allosteric cofactor for carbamoyl phosphate synthase (CPS1). In mammals, NAGS is expressed primarily in the liver and small intestine, and is localized to the mitochondrial matrix.

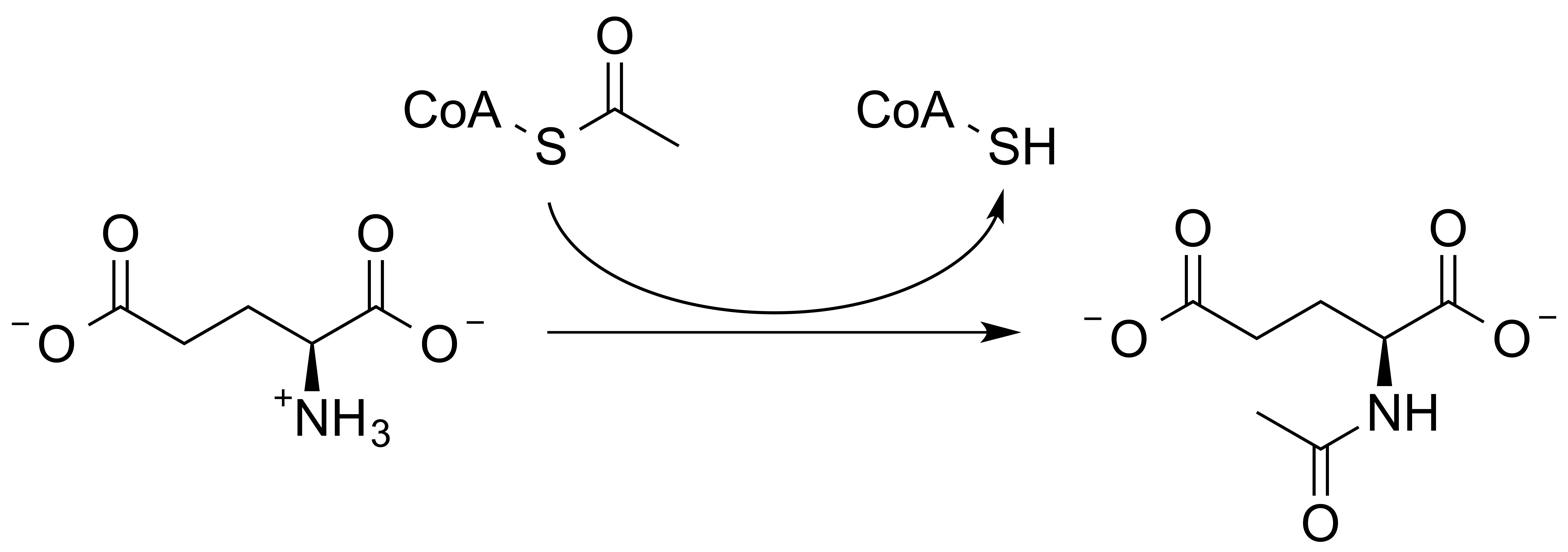
Overall reaction scheme for N-acetylglutamate (NAG) synthesis via N-acetylglutamate synthase (NAGS)

== Biological function ==
Most prokaryotes (bacteria) and lower eukaryotes (fungus, green algae, plants, and so on) produce NAG through ornithine acetyltransferase (OAT), which is part of a ‘cyclic’ ornithine production pathway. NAGS is therefore used in a supportive role, replenishing NAG reserves as required. In some plants and bacteria, however, NAGS catalyzes the first step in a ‘linear’ arginine production pathway.

The protein sequences of NAGS between prokaryotes, lower eukaryotes and higher eukaryotes have shown a remarkable lack of similarity. Sequence identity between prokaryotic and eukaryotic NAGS is largely <30%, while sequence identity between lower and higher eukaryotes is ~20%.

Enzyme activity of NAGS is modulated by L-arginine, which acts as an inhibitor in plant and bacterial NAGS, but an effector in vertebrates. While the role of arginine as an inhibitor of NAG in ornithine and arginine synthesis is well understood, there is some controversy as to the role of NAG in the urea cycle. The currently accepted role of NAG in vertebrates is as an essential allosteric cofactor for CPS1, and therefore it acts as the primary controller of flux through the urea cycle. In this role, feedback regulation from arginine would act to signal NAGS that ammonia is plentiful within the cell, and needs to be removed, accelerating NAGS function. As it stands, the evolutionary journey of NAGS from essential synthetic enzyme to primary urea cycle controller is yet to be fully understood.

== Mechanism ==
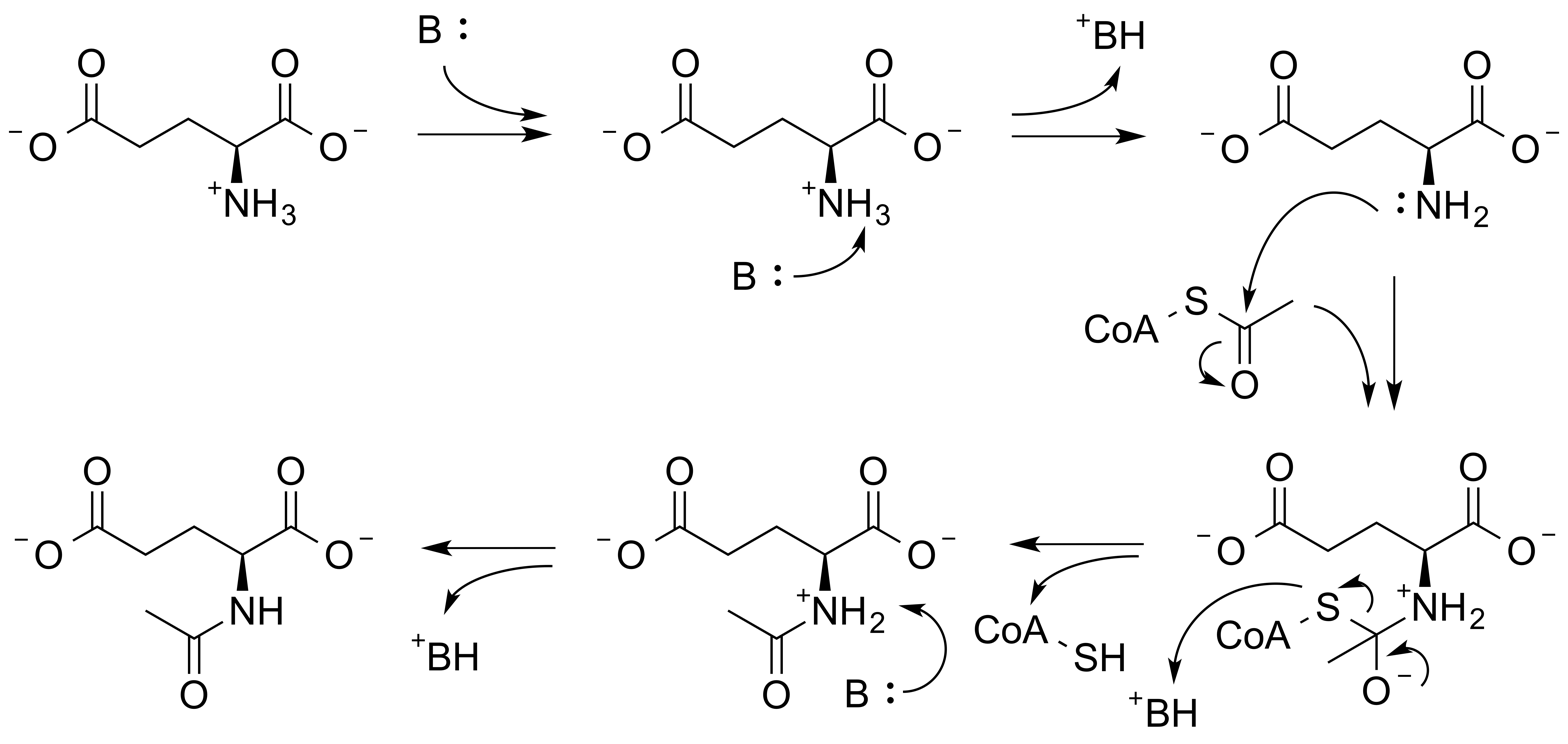
A simplified reaction mechanism for N-acetylglutamate synthase (NAGS)

Two mechanisms for N-acetyltransferase function have been proposed: a two-step, ping-pong mechanism involving transfer of the relevant acetyl group to an activated cysteine residue and a one-step mechanism through direct attack of the amino nitrogen on the carbonyl group. Studies conducted using NAGS derived from Neisseria gonorrhoeae suggest that NAGS proceeds through the previously described one-step mechanism. In this proposal, the carbonyl group of acetyl-CoA is attacked directly by the α-amino nitrogen of glutamate. This mechanism is supported by the activation of the carbonyl through hydrogen bond polarization, as well as the absence of a suitable cysteine within the active site to act as an intermediate acceptor of the acetyl group.

== Clinical significance ==
Inactivity of NAGS results in N-acetylglutamate synthase deficiency, a form of hyperammonemia. In many vertebrates, N-acetylglutamate is an essential allosteric cofactor of CPS1, the enzyme that catalyzes the first step of the urea cycle. Without NAG stimulation, CPS1 cannot convert ammonia to carbamoyl phosphate, resulting in toxic ammonia accumulation. Carbamoyl glutamate has shown promise as a possible treatment for NAGS deficiency. This is suspected to be a result of the structural similarities between NAG and carbamoyl glutamate, which allows carbamoyl glutamate to act as an effective agonist for CPS1.
