= Sodium phenylbutyrate/ursodoxicoltaurine =

Drug combination

Combination of
- Sodium phenylbutyrate: Pan-histone deacetylase inhibitor
- Ursodoxicoltaurine: bile acid

Clinical data
- Trade names: Albrioza, Relyvrio
- Other names: AMX0035
- AHFS/Drugs.com: Multum Consumer Information
- MedlinePlus: a623014
- License data: US DailyMed: Sodium phenylbutyrate/taurursodiol
- Routes of administration: By mouth
- ATC code: None

Legal status
- Legal status: CA: ℞-only; US: ℞-only

Identifiers
- KEGG: D12439

Sodium phenylbutyrate/ursodoxicoltaurine, also known as sodium phenylbutyrate/taurursodiol and sold under the brand names Albrioza and Relyvrio, is a fixed-dose combination medication used for the treatment of amyotrophic lateral sclerosis (ALS). It contains sodium phenylbutyrate and ursodoxicoltaurine (taurursodiol).

The most common adverse reactions experienced with sodium phenylbutyrate/ursodoxicoltaurine include diarrhea, abdominal pain, nausea and upper respiratory tract infection.

Sodium phenylbutyrate/ursodoxicoltaurine acts by blocking apoptotic pathways in the mitochondria and in the endoplasmic reticulum. Sodium phenylbutyrate is a chemical chaperone that helps proteins maintain their normal conformation, preventing aggregation that may lead to cell death. Ursodoxicoltaurine improves mitochondrial energy production.

The combination was approved for medical use in Canada as Albrioza, in June 2022, and in the United States, as Relyvrio, in September 2022. The European Union's drug regulators refused to approve it, citing concerns about effectiveness. In April 2024, the manufacturer announced that it is withdrawing the medication from the US and Canadian markets, due to it failing a key phase III clinical trial.

== Medical uses ==
Sodium phenylbutyrate/ursodoxicoltaurine is indicated for the treatment of amyotrophic lateral sclerosis (ALS).

== History ==
In the Phase II/III CENTAUR clinical trial, sodium phenylbutyrate/ursodoxicoltaurine (AMX0035) increased survival times for ALS patients. The Phase II PEGASUS clinical trial found that the drug was safe and tolerated by patients with Alzheimer's disease.

The efficacy of sodium phenylbutyrate/ursodoxicoltaurine for the treatment of ALS was demonstrated in a 24-week, multi-center, randomized, double-blind, placebo-controlled, parallel-group study. Compared to members of the 137-adult cohort that received a placebo medication, those randomly assigned to treatment with sodium phenylbutyrate/ursodoxicoltaurine showed a slower rate of declining daily functioning and longer overall survival.

In September 2022, the United States Food and Drug Administration (FDA) approved Amylyx Pharmaceuticals' application for Relyvrio's approval under the priority review and orphan drug programs.

In March 2024, Amylyx Pharmaceuticals announced that its Phase III PHOENIX clinical trial of 664 American and European adults followed over 48 weeks showed no statistically significant difference in the functioning of ALS patients that were randomly assigned to treatment with Relyvrio, as compared to those receiving a placebo drug.

== Society and culture ==
=== Legal status ===
The FDA Peripheral and Central Nervous System Drugs Advisory Committee voted not to recommend approval, and then in an unusual second vote recommended approval.

In April 2024, after a disappointing phase III trial of the medication failed to produce significant differences versus a placebo, Amylyx announced they would begin the process of withdrawing Albrioza and Relyviro from the North American market.

=== Economics ===
In the United States, healthcare insurer Cigna decided, in 2023, to reverse its prior decision to cover the cost of the medication for all ALS patients, opting instead to cover "patients who meet certain clinical criteria", arguing that the drug is "experimental, investigational or unproven".

Following the earlier announcement of plans to potentially withdraw the medication, the Institute for Clinical and Economic Review criticized the company for pricing the drug at $158,000 per year of treatment, given the uncertainty.

== Research ==
It is being studied as a treatment for Wolfram syndrome and progressive supranuclear palsy, despite the withdrawal of North American marketing authorization for amyotrophic lateral sclerosis (ALS).
