= Transient hyperammonemia of the newborn =

- Specialty: Neonatology

Transient hyperammonemia of the newborn (THAN) is an idiopathic disorder occasionally present in preterm newborns but not always symptomatic. Continuous dialysis or hemofiltration have proven to be the most effective treatment. Nutritional support and sodium benzoate have also been used to treat THAN.

== Signs and symptoms ==
Hyperammonemia occurs when the body produces excess ammonia. This ammonia primarily exists as ammonium ion that has a concentration less than or around 35 μmol/L in normal referenced serum levels. Excess ammonia is processed in the liver through the urea cycle to produce urea. Excess ammonia can be produced by bacterial hydrolysis of intestinal compounds, purine nucleotide cycles, the transamination of amino acid in voluntary muscles, and other metabolic events of filtration organs(kidneys and liver). In THAN, symptoms of hyperammonemia are observed within 24 hours of birth, and the causation of hyperammonemia must exclude urea cycle disorders. If the amount of ammonia entering the brain is increased, neurological disorders such as urea cycle enzyme deficiencies, Reye syndrome, seizures, and encephalopathies may occur. The most common indicator of THAN is respiratory distress syndrome. In newborns with THAN, the primary cause is thought to be genetic, but it has not been narrowed down to one gene or locus so the exact cause remains unknown. Observable CNS depression, comatose, metabolic acidosis, feeding difficulties, cyanosis, abnormal EEG, increased intraventricular hemorrhage, hypotonia, and irratibility are common symptoms of THAN. Individuals that develop hyperammonemia after birth are more likely to have hyperammonemia as a result in urea cycle enzyme deficiency (UCED).

== Pathophysiology ==
The pathophysiology for this disorder is mostly unknown but there have been a few propositions for its origin. One study suggested that a transient platelet activation of the infant's portal system is responsible for this hyperammonemia. Another study proposed that this occurs due to a shunting of blood away from the portal system of the liver through the ductus venosus directly into the systemic circulation. This causes the blood to skip the step of ammonia removal in the liver.

== Diagnosis ==
Since the etiology is unconfirmed, diagnosis is generally accomplished when there is hyperammonemia present within 24–36 hours of birth and urea cycle defects can be excluded. Organic acidemias and other metabolic errors must also be excluded. The diagnostic criteria for hyperammonemia is ammonia blood levels higher than 35 μmol/L. This is accomplished by observing urine ketones, organic acids, enzyme levels and activities, and plasma and urine amino acids. Mild Transient Hyperammonemia is diagnosed when ammonia levels are between 40-50 μM, lasts for about 6–8 weeks, and has no related neurological problems. Severe Transient Hyperammonemia is diagnosed when ammonia levels are above 50 μM up to as much as 4000 μM. Severe Transient Hyperammonemia causes neurological problems as ammonia levels in the brain are too high, which can cause infant hyptotonia as well as neonatal seizures. Severe Transient Hyperammonemia can also cause respiratory distress syndrome. Chest x-rays may resemble hyaline membrane disease.

=== Differentiating between UCED and THAN ===
A study was done by Hudak to find the differences between transient hyperammonemia of the newborn (THAN) and urea cycle enzyme deficiency(UCED) on 33 THAN victims and 13 UCED victims. Some of the clinical findings were not able to be measured in the THAN patients due to lack of equipment or lack of reported information in these 33 cases, so the numbers shown represent the number of positive clinical findings/out of the number cases in which the symptom could be observed or was documented. The results were as follows: Respiratory distress occurred in 22/23 of THAN patients and only in 0/13 of UCED patients. Abnormal chest radiographs were found in 23/25 THAN victims, and 0/9 in UCED patients. The gestational age was less than 36 weeks in 25/31 THAN patients, but only 1/13 UCED patients. The birthweight was less than 2.5 kg in 27/31 THAN patients and in 2/12 UCED patients. A coma that lasted 48 hours or longer occurred in 12/17 THAN patients but only occurred in 1/12 UCED patients. Free ammonia (NH4+) levels greater than 1500 μM occurred in 17/29 THAN patients but only 1/13 UCED patients.

== Treatment ==
Although the etiology is unconfirmed, transient hyperammonemia is known to be caused by increased levels of ammonia in the blood stream, as well as a failure of the urea cycle to convert enough of the ammonia into urea. Since transamination of proteins is a leading producer of ammonia, protein restriction may be recommended as a therapy to reduce the symptoms of the episode. THAN can also be treated by avoiding amino acids in TPN or total parenteral nutrition or by giving a high caloric diet to limit catabolism of the tissues and therefore to minimize the breakdown of endogenous protein. The most common treatments are dialysis (both peritoneal and hemodialysis), sodium benzoate, and arginine. Sodium Benzoate combines with glycine to be excreted in the form of hippuric acid. The goal of these treatments is to convert nitrogen to a compound that can be excreted more easily.

== Prognosis ==
The mortality rate for THAN is relatively high unless immediate treatment is obtained. The duration of hyperammonemia is directly correlated to morbidity as well as the associated neurological conditions. After the first hyperammonemic episode, there is no increased risk for future hyperammonemic episodes, and normal protein consumption can be continued.

== Epidemiology ==
Although this data may be underestimated as a result of misdiagnosis and failure to report illnesses in fatal cases, the current estimates are fairly representative of neonates with hyperammonemia. The United States has an estimated frequency of UCED of 1 per 25,000 live births. The international prevalence is between an estimated 1:8,000-1:44,000, varying widely by location. In order for THAN to be diagnosed, urea cycle deficiencies must be excluded, and the diagnosis must be made within 24–36 hours of birth. In 1996, one study said that there were only a confirmed 33 cases of THAN worldwide in literature. This study also admitted that at first they did not consider the possibility that the infant did not have a urea cycle deficiency. The hospital that this case occurred in did not have equipment to measure urea cycle enzymes, so they confirmed the diagnosis post mortem with an autopsy. Therefore, it is important to consider that many infants diagnosed with regular hyperammonemia, may have actually had THAN, but the urea cycle deficiency was not excluded and therefore did not meet the criteria for diagnosis.
