= Sodium phenylacetate/sodium benzoate =

Combination drug

Combination of
- Sodium phenylacetate: Antihyperammonemic
- Sodium benzoate: Antihyperammonemic

Clinical data
- Trade names: Ammonul, Ucephan
- AHFS/Drugs.com: Monograph
- ATC code: A16AX30 (WHO)

Legal status
- Legal status: US: ℞-only

Identifiers
- CAS Number: 114-70-5 (sodium phenyacetate) 532-32-1 (sodium benzoate)
- UNII: 48N6U1781G
- KEGG: D10205

Sodium phenylacetate/sodium benzoate, sold under the brand name Ammonul among others, is a fixed-dose combination medication used to treat high blood ammonia. It is a combination of sodium phenylacetate and sodium benzoate.
