= Eliglustat =

Chemical compound

Clinical data
- Trade names: Cerdelga
- AHFS/Drugs.com: Monograph
- MedlinePlus: a618038
- License data: US DailyMed: Eliglustat
- Routes of administration: By mouth
- ATC code: A16AX10 (WHO)

Legal status
- Legal status: AU: S4 (Prescription only); CA: ℞-only; UK: POM (Prescription only); US: ℞-only; EU: Rx-only

Identifiers
- IUPAC name: N-[(1R,2R)-1-(2,3-Dihydro-1,4-benzodioxin-6-yl)-1-hydroxy-3-(1-pyrrolidinyl)-2-propanyl]octanamide
- CAS Number: 491833-29-5
- PubChem CID: 23652731
- DrugBank: DB09039
- ChemSpider: 28475348
- UNII: DR40J4WA67
- KEGG: D09893
- ChEBI: CHEBI:82752
- ChEMBL: ChEMBL2110588
- CompTox Dashboard (EPA): DTXSID20964175

Chemical and physical data
- Formula: C_{23}H_{36}N_{2}O_{4}
- Molar mass: 404.551 g·mol^{−1}
- 3D model (JSmol): Interactive image
- SMILES: CCCCCCCC(=O)N[C@H](CN1CCCC1)[C@@H](C2=CC3=C(C=C2)OCCO3)O
- InChI: InChI=1S/C23H36N2O4/c1-2-3-4-5-6-9-22(26)24-19(17-25-12-7-8-13-25)23(27)18-10-11-20-21(16-18)29-15-14-28-20/h10-11,16,19,23,27H,2-9,12-15,17H2,1H3,(H,24,26)/t19-,23-/m1/s1; Key:FJZZPCZKBUKGGU-AUSIDOKSSA-N

Eliglustat, sold under the brand name Cerdelga, is a medication used for the treatment of Gaucher's disease. It was discovered at the University of Michigan, developed by Genzyme Corp, and was approved by the FDA in August 2014. Commonly used as the tartrate salt, the compound is believed to work by inhibition of glucosylceramide synthase. According to an article in Journal of the American Medical Association the oral substrate reduction therapy resulted in "significant improvements in spleen volume, hemoglobin level, liver volume, and platelet count" in untreated adults with Gaucher disease Type 1.

== History ==
Norman Radin began exploring the possibility of inhibiting the synthesis of lipid substrates involved in Gaucher's disease as early as 1982, and, in collaboration with the laboratory of Jim Shayman, found several candidate inhibitors in the mid-1990s. Genzyme initially rejected the candidates developed by Radin and Shayman, but after a news broke of a competitor developing a new treatment for Gaucher's disease, licensed the Radin/Shayman patents in 2000. Eliglustat did not receive FDA approval for another 14 years, a delay that Shayman speculated was due to some company leaders not being fully committed to developing a drug that would compete with imiglucerase (brand name Cerezyme), Genzyme's flagship treatment for Gaucher's disease.

== Society and culture ==
=== Economics ===
In 2014, the annual cost of eliglustat taken orally twice a day was $310,250. Cerezyme cost about $300,000 for the intravenous medication if taken twice a month. Manufacturing costs for eliglustat are slightly lower than for imiglucerase. Genzyme maintains higher prices for orphan drugs—most often paid for by insurers—in order to remain financially sustainable.
