= Elongator complex protein 5 =

Protein-coding gene in the species Homo sapiens

ELP5

Identifiers
- Aliases: ELP5, C17orf81, DERP6, MST071, MSTP071, HSPC002, elongator acetyltransferase complex subunit 5
- External IDs: OMIM: 615019; MGI: 1859017; HomoloGene: 10291; GeneCards: ELP5; OMA:ELP5 - orthologs

Gene location (Human)
Chr.	Chromosome 17 (human)
Band	17p13.1	Start	7,251,416 bp
Band	17p13.1	End	7,259,940 bp

Gene location (Mouse)
Chr.	Chromosome 11 (mouse)
Band	11|11 B3	Start	69,859,048 bp
Band	11|11 B3	End	69,873,343 bp
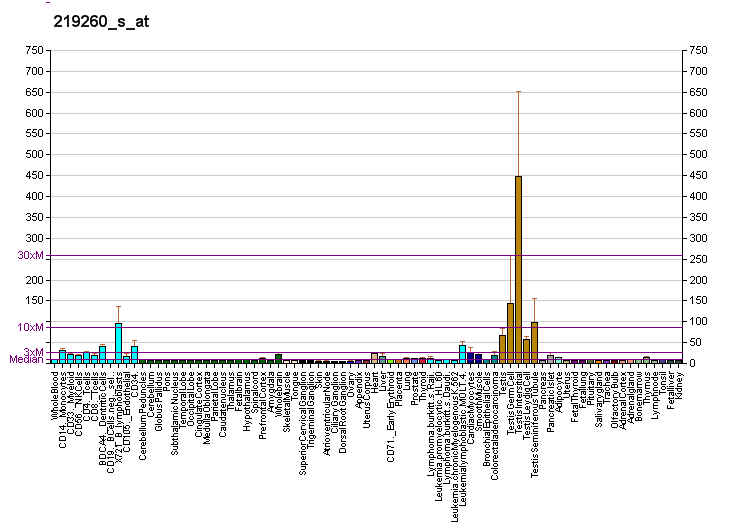
RNA expression pattern
Bgee	Human / Mouse (ortholog); Top expressed in: right testis; left testis; apex of heart; mucosa of transverse colon; left ventricle; smooth muscle tissue; right adrenal gland; right adrenal cortex; muscle of thigh; ventricular zone / Top expressed in: spermatocyte; spermatid; medial ganglionic eminence; yolk sac; embryo; morula; ventricular zone; embryo; seminiferous tubule; endocardial cushion; More reference expression data
BioGPS	More reference expression data
Gene ontology
Molecular function	protein binding
Cellular component	nucleus; cytoplasm; elongator holoenzyme complex; cytosol
Biological process	regulation of transcription, DNA-templated; positive regulation of cell migration; transcription, DNA-templated; tRNA wobble uridine modification
Sources:Amigo / QuickGO
Orthologs
Species	Human	Mouse
Entrez	23587	54351
Ensembl	ENSG00000170291; ENSG00000288485	ENSMUSG00000018565
UniProt	Q8TE02	Q99L85
RefSeq (mRNA)	NM_015362; NM_203413; NM_203414; NM_203415	NM_001253700; NM_018740
RefSeq (protein)	NP_056177; NP_981958; NP_981959; NP_981960	NP_001240629; NP_061210
Location (UCSC)	Chr 17: 7.25 – 7.26 Mb	Chr 11: 69.86 – 69.87 Mb
PubMed search
- Wikidata
View/Edit Human	View/Edit Mouse

Elongator complex protein 5 (ELP5) also known as dermal papilla-derived protein 6 (DERP6) is a protein that in humans is encoded by the ELP5 gene.
