= Chemical chaperone =

Class of compounds

Chemical chaperones are a class of small molecules that function to enhance the folding and/or stability of proteins. Chemical chaperones are a broad and diverse group of molecules, and they can influence protein stability and polypeptide organization through a variety of mechanisms. Chemical chaperones are used for a range of applications, from production of recombinant proteins to treatment of protein misfolding in vivo.

== Classes of chemical chaperones ==
There are many different small molecules that can function to enhance protein stability and folding, many of them can be broadly grouped into large classes based both on their structure and their proposed mechanism of action. The parameters that define these groups are not strictly defined, and many small molecules that exert a chemical chaperoning effect do not readily fall into one of these categories. For example, the free amino acid arginine is not classically defined as a chemical chaperone, but it has a well-documented anti-aggregation effect.

=== Osmolytes ===
Cellular osmolytes are polar small molecules that are synthesized or taken up by cells to maintain the integrity of cellular components during periods of osmotic or other forms of stress. Osmolytes are diverse in chemical structure, and include polyols, sugars, methylamines, and free amino acids and their derivatives. Examples of these include glycerol, trehalose, trimethylamine n-oxide (TMAO), and glycine. Despite being most active at relatively high concentrations, osmolytes don’t display any effects on normal cellular processes – for this reason, they are also commonly referred to as “compatible solutes”. Osmolytes exert their chaperoning effects indirectly by changing the interaction of the protein with solvent, rather than through any direct interaction with the protein. Unfavorable interactions between proteins and osmolytes increases the solvation of the protein with water. This increased hydration favors more compact polypeptide conformations, in which hydrophobic residues are more tightly sequestered from polar solvent. Thus, osmolytes are thought to work by structuring partially folded intermediates and thermodynamically stabilizing folded conformations to a greater extent than unfolded conformations.

=== Hydrophobic compounds ===
Chemical compounds that have varying degrees of hydrophobicity that still are soluble in aqueous environments can act as chemical chaperones as well. These compounds are thought to act by binding to solvent-exposed hydrophobic segments of unfolded or improperly folded proteins, thereby “protecting” them from aggregation. 4-phenylbutyrate (PBA) is a prominent example of this group of compounds, along with lysophosphatidic acids and other lipids and detergents.

=== Pharmacological chaperones ===
Another class of chaperones is composed of protein ligands, cofactors, competitive inhibitors, and other small molecules that bind specifically to certain proteins. Because these molecules are active only on a specific protein, they are referred to as pharmacological chaperones. These molecules can induce stability in a specific region of a protein through favorable binding interactions, which reduce the inherent conformational flexibility of the polypeptide chain. Another important property of pharmacological chaperones is that they are able to bind to the unfolded or improperly folded protein, and then dissociate once the protein is properly folded, leaving a functional protein.

== Applications ==
=== Recombinant protein expression ===
Beside clinical applications, chemical chaperones have proved useful in in vitro production of recombinant proteins.

==== Re-folding of insoluble proteins from inclusion bodies ====
Recombinant expression of protein in Escherichia coli often results in the formation of insoluble protein aggregates called inclusion bodies. These protein bodies require refolding in vitro once extracted from E.coli cells by strong detergent. Proteins are thought to unfold during the solubilization process, and subsequent removal of detergent by dilution of analysis allows their refolding. Both folding enhancers and aggregation suppressors are often employed during the removal of denaturant to facilitate folding to the native structure and to prevent aggregation. Folding enhancers assist protein to assume the native structure as soon as possible when the concentration of detergent is drastically decreased at once as in the dilution process. On the other hand, aggregation suppressors prevent protein folding intermediates from aggregating even after a long exposure to intermediate level of detergent as seen in dialysis. For example, it has been reported that Taurine significantly increases the yield of in vitro refolding for Fab fragment antibodies.

==== Periplasmic expression ====
The discovery of chemical chaperones’ effect on protein folding led to periplasmic protein expression, especially for ones that require an oxidative environment to form disulfide bonds for proper folding. Folding of proteins that are difficult to do in the cytoplasm can be enhanced in the periplasm where the osmotic pressure can be readily controlled. The osmotic pressure of the periplasmic space can be simply altered by changing that of the medium as osmolytes freely penetrate the outer membrane. Proteins is secreted to this space when an appropriate signal sequence is attached to its terminal. A good example of folding enhancement by periplasmic expression is the disulfide bond-containing plasminogen activator variant (rPA). Folding of rPA is shown to increase when folding enhancers or arginine is added to the culture medium.

==== Use of halophiles in protein production ====
Halophiles are a type of extremophiles that have adapted to extreme salt solutions. Halophiles are classified into two categories: 1) extremely halophilic archaea, and 2) moderately halophilic bacteria. The extremely halophilic archaea have adapted to require high salt concentrations (2.5M) in the living environment by incorporating the high salt concentration into the cell. On the other hand, the moderately halophilic bacteria achieve living in a wide range of salt concentrations by synthesis or incorporation of organic compounds. Many halophilic bacteria and archaea are easy to maintain, and their high cellular osmotic pressure has been exploited in recombinant protein production. The cellular environments of halophiles can be fine-tuned to accommodate folding of protein of interest by adjusting the concentration of osmolytes in the culture medium. Successful expression and folding of Ice nucleation protein, GFP, α-amylase, nucleotide diphosphate kinase, and serine racemase have been reported in halophiles.

=== Protein folding diseases ===
Since chemical chaperones promote the conservation of the native structure of proteins, the possibilities of developing chemical chaperones for clinical applications have been explored for various protein folding diseases.

==== Cystic fibrosis ====
Cystic fibrosis (CF) is a disease resulting from a failure to maintain the level of cystic fibrosis transmembrane conductance regulator (CFTR), which functions as a chloride channel in pulmonary tissues. ΔF508 point mutation in CFTR protein interferes with maturation of the protein has been found in a number of CF patients. It is found that the mutant CFTR mostly fails to transport to the cell membrane and is degraded in the ER; however, ones that successfully make it to the cell membrane are fully functional. As a result, a number of chemical chaperones have been shown to promote the trafficking of ΔF508 CFTR to the plasma membrane.

==== Transthyretin Amyloidoses ====
Partially denatured transthyretin (TTR) can promote the formation of amyloid fibrils in cells, and this aggregation can lead to cellular toxicity and a variety of human disease pathologies. Many small molecule inhibitors of TTR amyloid formation have been discovered that act by kinetically stabilizing the TTR tetramer. This prevents monomer misfolding events by disfavoring the dissociation of the TTR tetramer. Tafamidis is one such small molecule that has been approved by several international regulatory agencies for the treatment of Transthyretin Familial Amyloid Polyneuropathy.

== See also ==
- Chaperone (protein), proteins that perform the same function
