= Norman Radin =

Neurochemist

Norman S. Radin
- Born: New York City, NY
- Died: January 21, 2013; Cupertino, California
- Known for: Discovery of eliglustat
- Spouse: Norma L. Radin
- Children: 2
- Awards: Javits Neuroscience Investigator Award

Academic background
- Education: Columbia University

Academic work
- Discipline: Neurochemistry
- Sub-discipline: Glycolipids
- Institutions: University of Michigan; Northwestern University

Norman S. Radin was a neurochemist who, along with Jim Shayman, developed eliglustat, a drug for treating Gaucher's disease. Born in New York City, he received a B.S. in 1941 and Ph.D. in 1949 from Columbia University, later becoming an associate professor at Northwestern University before moving to the University of Michigan. Norman was a recipient of the National Institutes of Health Javits Neuroscience Investigator Award. He married Norma Levinson on December 23, 1947, in Portland, Oregon. She was a professor emeritus of social work at the University of Michigan and died of cancer on September 24, 1998. He died on January 21, 2013, at his home in Cupertino, California.
