= Phenylacetyl-CoA dehydrogenase =

Identifiers
- EC no.: 1.17.5.1

Databases
- IntEnz: IntEnz view
- BRENDA: BRENDA entry
- ExPASy: NiceZyme view
- KEGG: KEGG entry
- MetaCyc: metabolic pathway
- PRIAM: profile
- PDB structures: RCSB PDB PDBe PDBsum
Search
- PMC: articles
- PubMed: articles
- NCBI: proteins

In enzymology, a phenylacetyl-CoA dehydrogenase (EC 1.17.5.1) is an enzyme that catalyzes the chemical reaction

phenylacetyl-CoA + H_{2}O + 2 quinone $\rightleftharpoons$ phenylglyoxylyl-CoA + 2 quinol

The 3 substrates of this enzyme are phenylacetyl-CoA, H_{2}O, and quinone, whereas its two products are phenylglyoxylyl-CoA and quinol.

This enzyme belongs to the family of oxidoreductases, specifically those acting on CH or CH_{2} groups with a quinone or similar compound as acceptor. The systematic name of this enzyme class is phenylacetyl-CoA:quinone oxidoreductase. This enzyme is also called phenylacetyl-CoA:acceptor oxidoreductase.
