= Phenylacetylglutamine =

Chemical compound

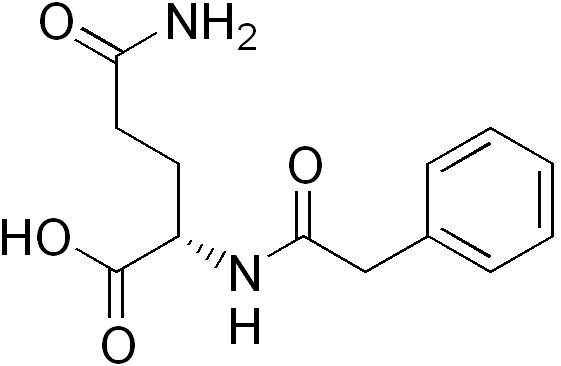

Names
- IUPAC name 5-amino-5-oxo-2-[(1-oxo-2-phenylethyl)amino]pentanoic acid

Identifiers
CAS Number	28047-15-6
3D model (JSmol)	Interactive image
Abbreviations	PAGN, PAGln
ChEBI	CHEBI:17884
ChemSpider	83292
PubChem CID	92258
UNII	92358I79RG
CompTox Dashboard (EPA)	DTXSID90182324
- InChI: InChI=1S/C13H16N2O4/c14-11(16)7-6-10(13(18)19)15-12(17)8-9-4-2-1-3-5-9/h1-5,10H,6-8H2,(H2,14,16)(H,15,17)(H,18,19)/t10-/m0/s1 Key: JFLIEFSWGNOPJJ-JTQLQIEISA-N; InChI=1/C13H16N2O4/c14-11(16)7-6-10(13(18)19)15-12(17)8-9-4-2-1-3-5-9/h1-5,10H,6-8H2,(H2,14,16)(H,15,17)(H,18,19)/t10-/m0/s1 Key: JFLIEFSWGNOPJJ-JTQLQIEIBV
- SMILES: O=C(N[C@H](C(=O)O)CCC(=O)N)Cc1ccccc1

Properties
Chemical formula	C_{13}H_{16}N_{2}O_{4}
Molar mass	264.281 g·mol^{−1}
- Except where otherwise noted, data are given for materials in their standard state (at 25 °C [77 °F], 100 kPa). verify (what is ?) Infobox references

Phenylacetylglutamine is a product formed by the conjugation of phenylacetate and glutamine. It is a common metabolite that occurs naturally in human urine.

The highly-nitrogenous compound is most commonly encountered in human subjects with urea cycle disorders. Conditions such as uremia or hyperammonemia tend to cause high levels of nitrogen in the form of ammonia in the blood. Uremic conditions are a result of defects in enzymes that convert ammonia to urea: the primary nitrogenous waste metabolite in the urea cycle.

== Metabolism ==
Phenylacetylglutamine is the primary metabolite of the degradation of phenylacetate when in the presence of glutamine in the liver. It is also produced in higher concentrations in the body through the metabolic degradation pathway of the pharmaceutical compounds sodium phenylbutyrate, glycerol phenylbutyrate, and sodium phenylacetate, considered more toxic, that are used as treatments for the physiological dysfunction in urea cycling.

Phenylbutyrate is beta-oxidized into phenylacetate which is conjugated with glutamine in the liver and excreted by the kidney. Phenylacetylglutamine is the product of uremic conditions that require an alternative pathway to the urea cycle for nitrogen waste removal. This process produces comparable levels of phenylacetylglutamine in urine in relation to urea levels in a properly functioning urea cycle. In 24 hours 80-100% of a dose of phenylbutyrate is excreted in the urine as phenylacetylglutamine.

The metabolism and conjugation of phenylacetate with glutamine in the liver involves amino acid acetylation carried out by the enzyme phenylacetyltranferase or glutamine N-acetyl transferase. The enzyme catalyzes the reaction of the substrates phenylacetyl-CoA and L-glutamine to produce CoA and alpha-N-phenylacetyl-L-glutamine and phenylacetic acid. The catalytic enzyme has been isolated in the human liver mitochondria. Furthermore, phenylacetylglutamine has been found in human urine, but not in the excretory material of rats, dogs, cats, monkeys, sheep, or horses. Throughout the metabolic process, phenylacetylglutamine is bound and conjugated by free-plasma in the kidney to remove excess nitrogen through its excretion in the urine.

== As a biomarker ==
Elevated levels of nitrogen in the blood increase the amount of glutamine, the primary, non-toxic carrier of ammonia in the blood, within patients with hyperammonemia and inborn errors in urea synthesis. Phenylacetylglutamine levels in the urine serves as a more effective biomarker for the excretion of nitrogenous waste than measures of blood plasma, which fluctuate and are a less effective therapeutic monitor of waste nitrogen levels. A 24-hour metabolic urine test of phenylacetylglutamine provides a non-invasive biomarker of waste nitrogen that most consistently reflects the dose of phenylbutyric acid or glycerol phenylbutyrate used to treat patients with urea-cycle disorders. Phenylacetylglutamine isotopically labeled with ^{14}C also serves more broadly to characterize relative rates of cellular reactions and functions as a general, non-invasive biomarker for gluconeogenesis and citric acid cycle intermediates in the liver.

== Chronic kidney disorder ==
High levels of phenylacetylglutamine in the urine following metabolism by the gut microbiota may also indicate early renal decline associated with kidney dysfunction and chronic kidney disease (CKD). In CKD, phenylacetylglutamine is considered a uremic toxin which is taken up, circulated and retained in the blood after microbial fermentation of certain proteins and amino acids in the gut. Blood serum levels of phenylacetylglutamine in CKD are used as a mortality determinant. Blood plasma levels of phenylacetylglutamine increase with exposure to cigarette smoke, in patients with ischemic heart failure, with cardiovascular risk or hypertension, in the development of renal disease, and in patients with type 2 diabetes.

== See also ==
- Glycerol phenylbutyrate
- Sodium phenylacetate
- Sodium phenylbutyrate
