= Phenylacetate =

Phenylacetate may refer to:

- Phenyl acetate, the ester of phenol and acetic acid
- The conjugate base of phenylacetic acid
