= Phenylacetyl-CoA =

- Chemical structure of phenylacetyl-CoA

Names
- IUPAC name 3′-O-Phosphonoadenosine 5′-[(3R)-3-hydroxy-2-methyl-4-{[3-oxo-3-({2-[(phenylacetyl)sulfanyl]ethyl}amino)propyl]amino}-4-oxobutyl dihydrogen diphosphate]
- Systematic IUPAC name O^{1}-{[(2R,3S,4R,5R)-5-(6-Amino-9H-purin-9-yl)-4-hydroxy-3-(phosphonooxy)oxolan-2-yl]methyl} O^{3}-[(3R)-3-hydroxy-2-methyl-4-{[3-oxo-3-({2-[(phenylacetyl)sulfanyl]ethyl}amino)propyl]amino}-4-oxobutyl] dihydrogen diphosphate

Identifiers
CAS Number	7532-39-0
3D model (JSmol)	Interactive image
ChEBI	CHEBI:15537
ChEMBL	ChEMBL3526286
ChemSpider	145148
KEGG	C00582
PubChem CID	165620
UNII	CNJ7ZS9RVB
CompTox Dashboard (EPA)	DTXSID80996770
- InChI: InChI=1S/C29H42N7O17P3S/c1-29(2,24(40)27(41)32-9-8-19(37)31-10-11-57-20(38)12-17-6-4-3-5-7-17)14-50-56(47,48)53-55(45,46)49-13-18-23(52-54(42,43)44)22(39)28(51-18)36-16-35-21-25(30)33-15-34-26(21)36/h3-7,15-16,18,22-24,28,39-40H,8-14H2,1-2H3,(H,31,37)(H,32,41)(H,45,46)(H,47,48)(H2,30,33,34)(H2,42,43,44)/t18-,22-,23-,24+,28-/m1/s1 Key: ZIGIFDRJFZYEEQ-CECATXLMSA-N
- SMILES: CC(C)(COP(=O)(O)OP(=O)(O)OC[C@@H]1[C@H]([C@H]([C@@H](O1)N2C=NC3=C(N=CN=C32)N)O)OP(=O)(O)O)[C@H](C(=O)NCCC(=O)NCCSC(=O)CC4=CC=CC=C4)O

Properties
Chemical formula	C_{29}H_{42}N_{7}O_{17}P_{3}S
Molar mass	885.67 g·mol^{−1}
- Except where otherwise noted, data are given for materials in their standard state (at 25 °C [77 °F], 100 kPa). Infobox references

Phenylacetyl-CoA (C_{29}H_{42}N_{7}O_{17}P_{3}S) is a form of acetyl-CoA formed from the condensation of the thiol group from coenzyme A with the carboxyl group of phenylacetic acid.

Its molecular-weight is 885.7 g/mol. and IUPAC name is S-[2-[3-[[(2R)-4-[[[(2R,3S,4R,5R)-5-(6-aminopurin-9-yl)-4-hydroxy-3-phosphonooxyoxolan-2-yl]methoxy-hydroxyphosphoryl]oxy-hydroxyphosphoryl]oxy-2-hydroxy-3,3-dimethylbutanoyl]amino]propanoylamino]ethyl] 2-phenylethanethioate. It is formed via the actions of Phenylacetate—CoA ligase.

Phenylacetyl-CoA is often produced via the reduction of ATP to AMP and the conversion of phenylacetate and CoA to diphosphate and Phenylacetyl-CoA.

ATP + phenylacetate + CoA → AMP + diphosphate + phenylacetyl-CoA

This reaction is catalyzed by phenylacetate-CoA ligase.

Phenylacetyl-CoA combines with water and quinone to produce phenylglyoxylyl-CoA and quinol via a phenylacetyl-CoA dehydrogenase reaction acting as an oxidoreductase.

Phenylacetyl-CoA inhibits choline acetyltransferase acting as a neurotoxin. It competes with acetyl-CoA.
