= Phenylacetic acid =

- Structural formula

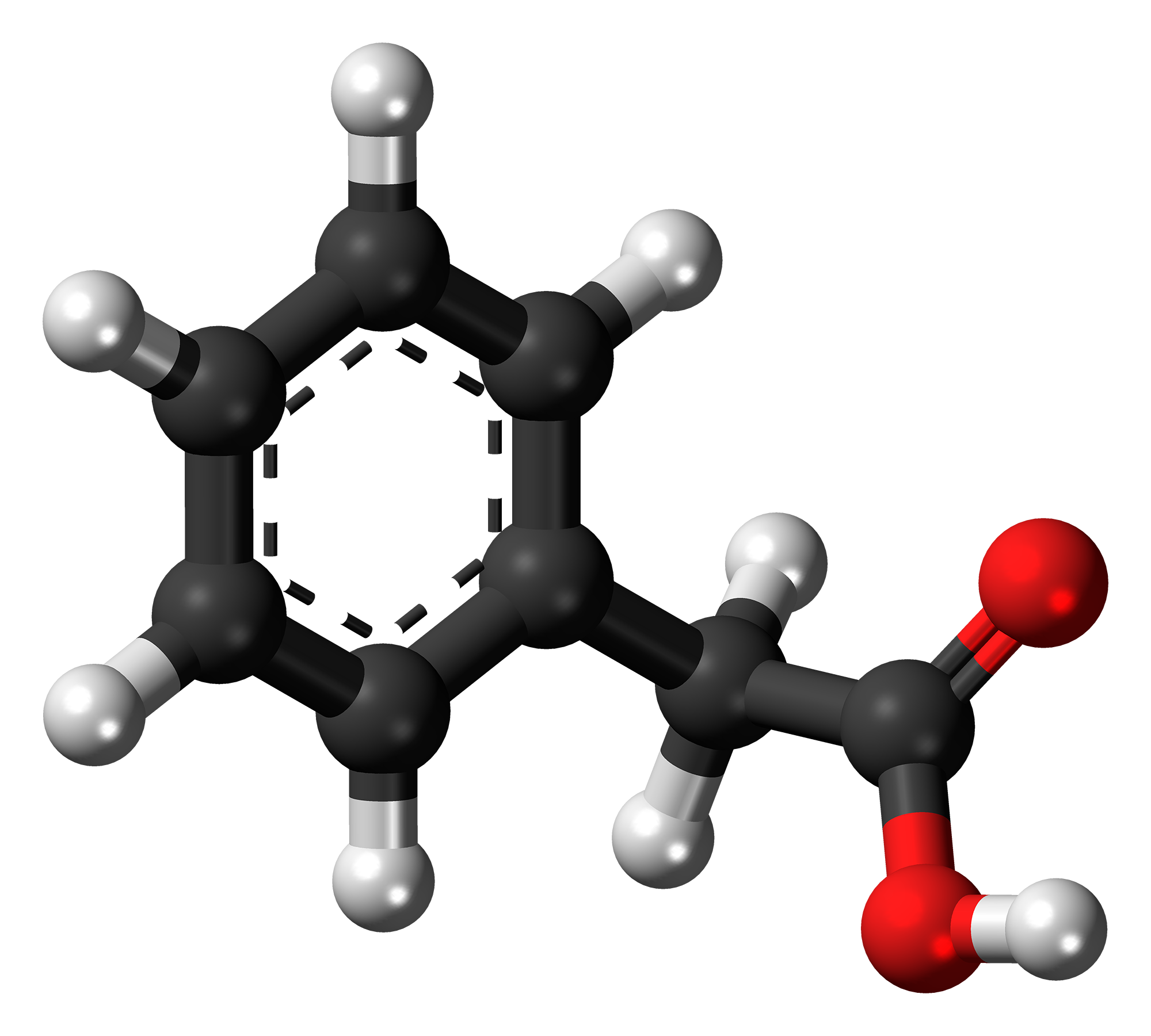
- Ball-and-stick model of phenylacetic acid

Names
- Preferred IUPAC name Phenylacetic acid
- Systematic IUPAC name 2-Phenylethanoic acid
- Other names α-Toluic acid Benzeneacetic acid 2-Phenylacetic acid β-Phenylacetic acid

Identifiers
CAS Number	103-82-2
3D model (JSmol)	Interactive image
Abbreviations	BnCOOH; BnCO_{2}H; PhCH_{2}COOH; PhCH_{2}CO_{2}H
Beilstein Reference	1099647
ChEBI	CHEBI:30745
ChEMBL	ChEMBL1044
ChemSpider	10181341
DrugBank	DB09269
ECHA InfoCard	100.002.862
EC Number	203-148-6
Gmelin Reference	68976
KEGG	C07086
PubChem CID	999
RTECS number	AJ2430000
UNII	ER5I1W795A
CompTox Dashboard (EPA)	DTXSID2021656
- InChI: InChI=1S/C8H8O2/c9-8(10)6-7-4-2-1-3-5-7/h1-5H,6H2,(H,9,10) Key: WLJVXDMOQOGPHL-UHFFFAOYSA-N; InChI=1/C8H8O2/c9-8(10)6-7-4-2-1-3-5-7/h1-5H,6H2,(H,9,10) Key: WLJVXDMOQOGPHL-UHFFFAOYAR
- SMILES: O=C(O)Cc1ccccc1

Properties
Chemical formula	C_{8}H_{8}O_{2}
Molar mass	136.150 g·mol^{−1}
Appearance	white solid
Odor	honey-like (low conc.); urine-like (high conc.)
Density	1.0809 g/cm^{3}
Melting point	76 to 77 °C (169 to 171 °F; 349 to 350 K)
Boiling point	265.5 °C (509.9 °F; 538.6 K)
Solubility in water	15 g/L
Acidity (pK_{a})	4.31 (H_{2}O)
Conjugate base	Phenylacetate
Magnetic susceptibility (χ)	−82.72·10^{−6} cm^{3}/mol

Hazards
- GHS labelling
Pictograms	(GHS05: Corrosive) (GHS07: Exclamation mark)
Signal word	Danger
Hazard statements	H318, H319
Precautionary statements	P264, P280, P305+P351+P338, P310, P337+P313
NFPA 704 (fire diamond)	2 1 0
Safety data sheet (SDS)	External MSDS
Legal status	BR: Class D1 (Drug precursors)

Related compounds
Related compounds	Benzoic acid, Phenylpropanoic acid, Cinnamic acid
- Except where otherwise noted, data are given for materials in their standard state (at 25 °C [77 °F], 100 kPa). verify (what is ?) Infobox references

Phenylacetic acid (conjugate base phenylacetate) is an organic compound containing a phenyl functional group and a carboxylic acid functional group. It is a white solid with a strong honey-like odor. Endogenously, it is a catabolite of phenylalanine. As a commercial chemical, because it can be used in the illicit production of phenylacetone (used in the manufacture of substituted amphetamines), it is subject to controls in countries including the United States and China.

== Occurrence ==
Phenylacetic acid has been found to be an active auxin (a type of plant hormone), found predominantly in fruits. However, its effect is much weaker than the effect of the basic auxin molecule indole-3-acetic acid. In addition the molecule is naturally produced by the metapleural gland of most ant species and used as an antimicrobial. It is also the oxidation product of phenethylamine in humans following metabolism by monoamine oxidase and subsequent metabolism of the intermediate product, phenylacetaldehyde, by the aldehyde dehydrogenase enzyme; these enzymes are also found in many other organisms. It is one of the main compounds responsible for the flavor of honey. It is also responsible for the musty odor of untreated phenylketonuria.

== Preparation ==
This compound may be prepared by the hydrolysis of benzyl cyanide:

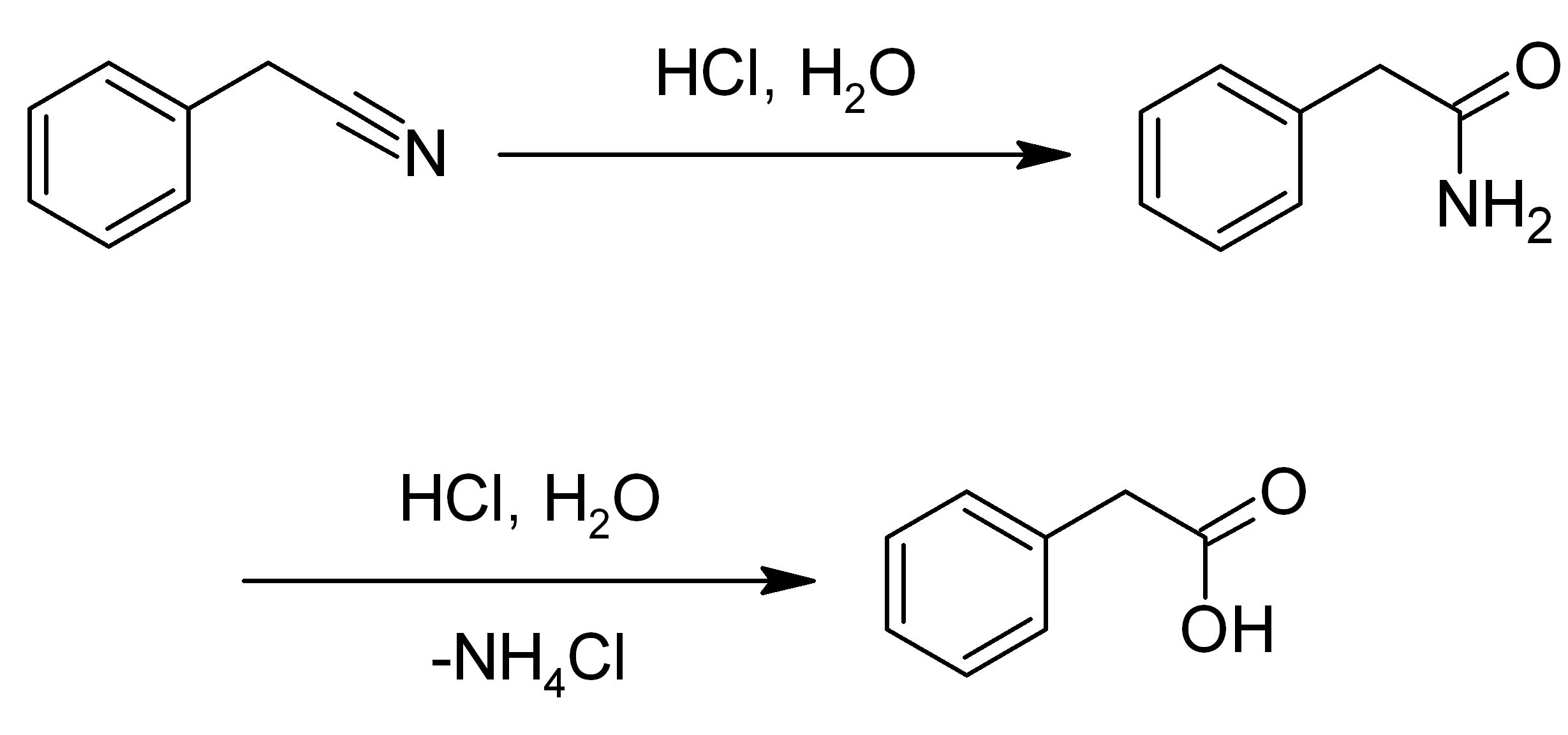

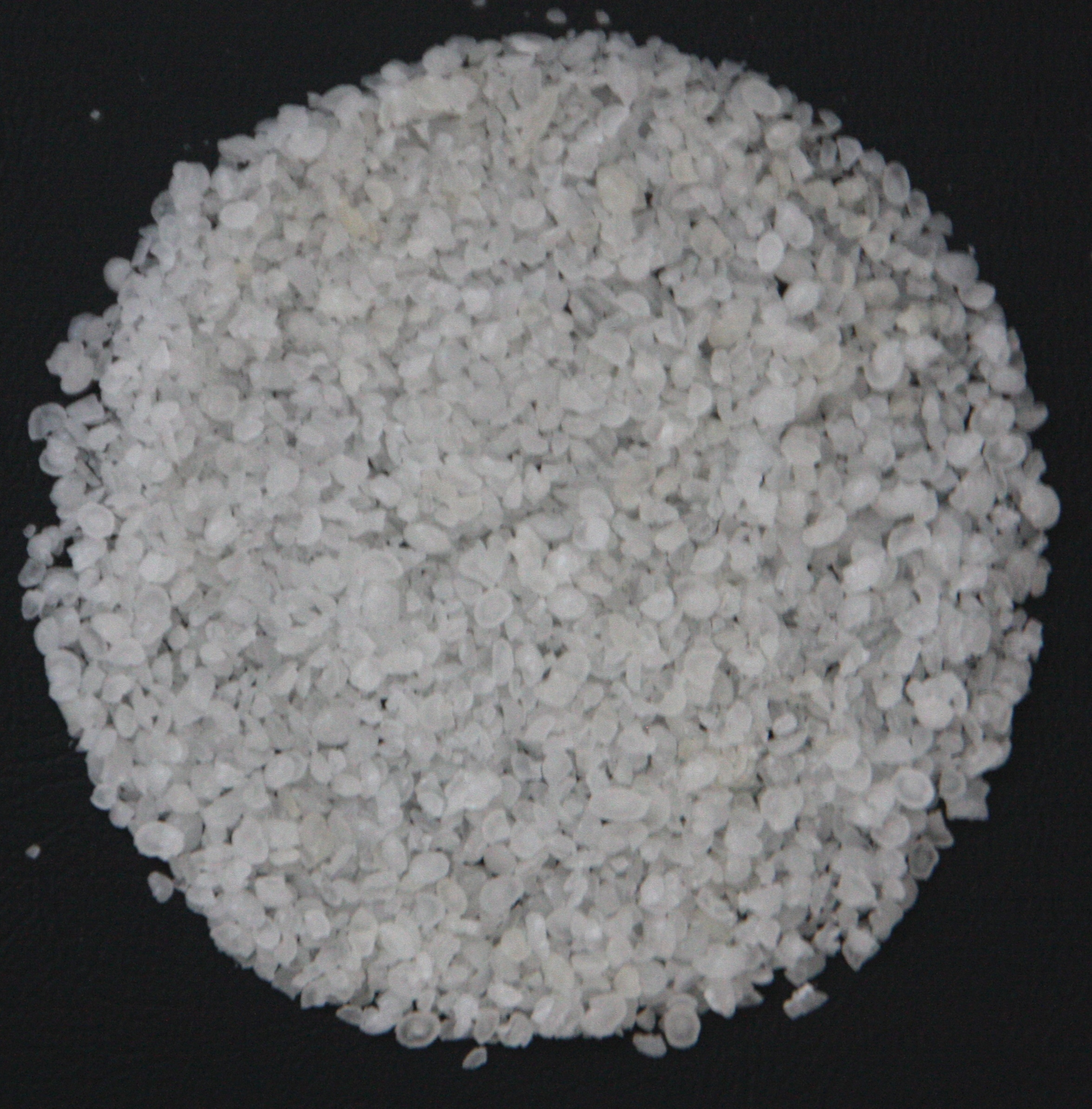
Phenylacetic acid

== Reactions ==
Phenylacetic acid undergoes ketonic decarboxylation to form ketones. It can be condensed with itself to form dibenzyl ketone, or with a large excess of another carboxylic acid (in the form of an acid anhydride), such as with acetic anhydride to form phenylacetone.

== Applications ==
Phenylacetic acid is used in some perfumes, as it possesses a persistent, honey-like odor at low concentrations. It is also used in penicillin G production and diclofenac production. It is also employed to treat type II hyperammonemia to help reduce the amounts of ammonia in a patient's bloodstream by forming phenylacetyl-CoA, which then reacts with nitrogen-rich glutamine to form phenylacetylglutamine. This compound is then excreted from the patient's body. It is also used in the illicit production of phenylacetone, which is used in the manufacture of methamphetamine.

The sodium salt of phenylacetic acid, sodium phenylacetate, is used as a pharmaceutical drug for the treatment of urea cycle disorders, including as the combination drug sodium phenylacetate/sodium benzoate (Ammonul).

Phenylacetic acid is used in the preparation of and derived from several pharmaceutical drugs, including camylofin, bendazol, triafungin, phenacemide, lorcainide, phenindione, phenelzine and cyclopentolate.

== In popular culture ==
In the crime drama Breaking Bad, phenylacetic acid is featured twice as a precursor to methamphetamine, first in the episode titled "A No-Rough-Stuff-Type Deal", then in "Salud".

== See also ==
- Cathinone
- Methyl phenylacetate
