= N-succinylornithine carbamoyltransferase =

Identifiers
- EC no.: 2.1.3.11

Databases
- IntEnz: IntEnz view
- BRENDA: BRENDA entry
- ExPASy: NiceZyme view
- KEGG: KEGG entry
- MetaCyc: metabolic pathway
- PRIAM: profile
- PDB structures: RCSB PDB PDBe PDBsum
Search
- PMC: articles
- PubMed: articles
- NCBI: proteins

N-succinylornithine carbamoyltransferase (EC 2.1.3.11, succinylornithine transcarbamylase, N-succinyl-L-ornithine transcarbamylase, SOTCase) is an enzyme with systematic name carbamoyl phosphate:N^{2}-succinyl-L-ornithine carbamoyltransferase. It catalyses the following chemical reaction

carbamoyl phosphate
+
N(2)-succinyl-L-ornithine
H_{2}PO^{−}_{4}
H_{2}PO^{−}_{4}
N(2)-succinyl-L-citrulline

The enzyme converts N(2)-succinyl-L-ornithine to N(2)-succinyl-L-citrulline by transferring a carbamoyl group from carbamoyl phosphate. It is specific for N-succinyl-L-ornithine and was characterised from Bacteroides fragilis. It differs in structure from the enzyme N-acetylornithine carbamoyltransferase in only one amino acid at the active site.
