= CAD protein =

Protein found in humans

CAD
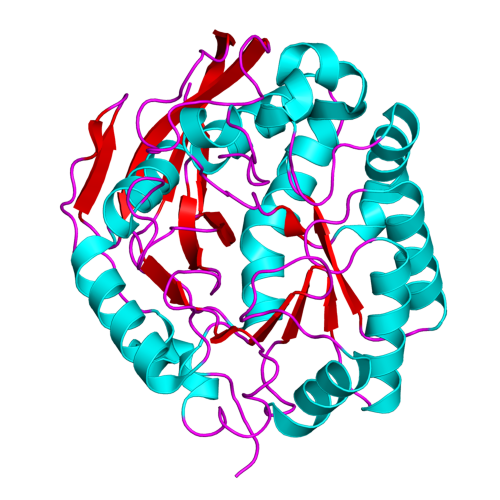

Identifiers
- Aliases: CAD, CDG1Z, carbamoyl-phosphate synthetase 2, aspartate transcarbamylase, and dihydroorotase, GATD4, EIEE50, DEE50
- External IDs: OMIM: 114010; MGI: 1916969; GeneCards: CAD
Available structures
PDB	Ortholog search: PDBe RCSB
PDB	List of PDB id codes 4BY3, 4C6B, 4C6C, 4C6D, 4C6E, 4C6F, 4C6I, 4C6J, 4C6K, 4C6L, 4C6M, 4C6N, 4C6O, 4C6P, 4C6Q, 5G1P, 5G1O, 5G1N
Enzyme activity
EC #	BRENDA	ExPASy	KEGG	MetaCyc
2.1.3.2	↗	↗	↗	↗
3.5.1.2	↗	↗	↗	↗
3.5.2.3	↗	↗	↗	↗
6.3.4.16	↗	↗	↗	↗
6.3.5.5	↗	↗	↗	↗

Gene location (Human)
Chr.	Chromosome 2 (human)
Band	2p23.3	Start	27,217,369 bp
Band	2p23.3	End	27,243,943 bp

Gene location (Mouse)
Chr.	Chromosome 5 (mouse)
Band	5|5 B1	Start	31,212,124 bp
Band	5|5 B1	End	31,235,823 bp
RNA expression pattern
Bgee	Human / Mouse (ortholog); Top expressed in: body of uterus; stromal cell of endometrium; right lobe of liver; gonad; ventricular zone; right testis; right uterine tube; left testis; right ovary; mucosa of transverse colon / Top expressed in: internal carotid artery; epiblast; external carotid artery; gastrula; fetal liver hematopoietic progenitor cell; tibiofemoral joint; primitive streak; hair follicle; lobe of prostate; tail of embryo; More reference expression data
BioGPS	n/a
Gene ontology
Molecular function	transferase activity; protein kinase activity; nucleotide binding; amino acid binding; aspartate binding; zinc ion binding; hydrolase activity, acting on carbon-nitrogen (but not peptide) bonds, in cyclic amides; metal ion binding; dihydroorotase activity; ligase activity; catalytic activity; hydrolase activity, acting on carbon-nitrogen (but not peptide) bonds; carboxyl- or carbamoyltransferase activity; enzyme binding; hydrolase activity; ATP binding; aspartate carbamoyltransferase activity; carbamoyl-phosphate synthase (ammonia) activity; carbamoyl-phosphate synthase (glutamine-hydrolyzing) activity; identical protein binding
Cellular component	cytoplasm; membrane; nuclear matrix; nucleoplasm; extracellular exosome; nucleus; cytosol; cell projection; soma; terminal bouton; protein-containing complex
Biological process	cellular amino acid metabolic process; pyrimidine nucleoside biosynthetic process; glutamine metabolic process; nitrogen compound metabolic process; 'de novo' pyrimidine nucleobase biosynthetic process; pyrimidine nucleotide biosynthetic process; protein autophosphorylation; metabolism; peptidyl-threonine phosphorylation; 'de novo' UMP biosynthetic process; urea cycle; arginine biosynthetic process; liver development; UTP biosynthetic process; development of the heart; female pregnancy; lactation; response to amine; citrulline biosynthetic process; response to caffeine; animal organ regeneration; response to insulin; response to testosterone; response to starvation; response to cortisol; carbamoyl phosphate biosynthetic process; cellular response to epidermal growth factor stimulus
Sources:Amigo / QuickGO
Orthologs
Databases	NCBI: entry; OMA: entry
Species	Human	Mouse
Entrez	790	69719
Ensembl	ENSG00000084774	ENSMUSG00000013629
UniProt	P27708	B2RQC6
RefSeq (mRNA)	NM_001306079; NM_004341	NM_001289522; NM_001289523; NM_023525
RefSeq (protein)	NP_001293008; NP_004332	NP_001276451; NP_001276452; NP_076014; NP_001390328; NP_001390329
Location (UCSC)	Chr 2: 27.22 – 27.24 Mb	Chr 5: 31.21 – 31.24 Mb
PubMed search
- Wikidata
View/Edit Human	View/Edit Mouse

CAD protein (carbamoyl-phosphate synthetase 2, aspartate transcarbamylase, and dihydroorotase) is a trifunctional multi-domain enzyme involved in the first three steps of pyrimidine biosynthesis. De-novo synthesis starts with cytosolic carbamoylphosphate synthetase II which uses glutamine, carbon dioxide and ATP. This enzyme is inhibited by uridine triphosphate (feedback inhibition).

In 2015, the first observed pathological mutations of CAD were found in a four-year-old boy.

CAD protein has been observed in the mid-piece of mammalian spermatozoa, among the mitochondria.

== Structure ==
CAD protein has a molecular weight of 243 KDa. It is a polypeptide made up of four different domains which make for a multi enzyme unit: Glutaminase (GLN), carbamoyl phosphate synthetase (CPS II), Dihydroorotase (DHO) and aspartate transcarbamoylase (ATC). The protein assembles into ~1.5 MDa hexamers. More specifically, the DHO domain assembles into dimers, and ATC domains do so into trimers. The hexamers are then formed by DHO dimerization of two ATC trimers, and this connection does not impact the kinetic properties. In addition, it is thought that three GLN-CPS II dimers border the DHO-ATC complex. This is suggested by the fact that CPS II is not stable unless a part of the complex. DHO and ATC and are thought to be the main part of the formation of the protein. The active site is covered by a carboxylated lysine, serving as a bridge for two zinc ions (+2 charge). Another zinc ion helps stabilize a histidinate ion. The zinc and lysine are involved in the activity of the enzyme.

== Function ==
This protein starts and controls the creation of pyrimidines in animals by acting as an enzyme. CAD is known to perform multiple reactions. For example, GLN and CPS II create carbamoyl phosphate from bicarbonate, glutamine, and two ATP molecules. The ATC then takes the newly made carbamoyl phosphate and forms carbamoyl aspartate by reacting with aspartate. DHO then takes carbamoyl aspartate and converts it to dihydroorotate. This molecule is a precursor of a pyrimidine ring, and this process shows the CAD protein's function in pyrimidine synthesis through carbamoyl-phosphate synthase and dihydroorotase activity.

In order to function, CAD requires certain co-factors. Zinc (+2) is needed for dihydroorotase activity, and thus three Zn+2 molecules bind to each subunit. Magnesium and manganese are also necessary, and either element is bound with four per subunit. The Michaelis–Menten constant, Km, shows the affinity of two molecules for one another. The Km of CAD for dihydroorotate is 28μM, and for N-carbamoyl-L-aspartate, it is 241μM.

== Regulation ==
CAD protein is regulated by various molecules in order to increase or stop enzymatic activity. Uridine-5′-triphosphate (UTP) is an end product that allosterically inhibits the CPS II step through negative feedback. Additionally, UMP acts as an allosteric inhibitor to the CPS II reaction. On the other hand, this step is activated by 5-phosphoribosyl-α-pyrophosphate (PRPP), which is also a reactant for purine and pyrimidine synthesis. CAD activity is stimulated by the S6 kinase-dependent phosphorylation of CAD at the S1859 site downstream of mTORC1 signaling. CAD is also regulated by mLST8, an mTORC1/2 component.

== Medical Implications ==
Congenital disorder of glycosylation, Type Iz is a rare disease caused by mutations in the CAD gene. This disease causes epileptic encephalopathy, normocytic anemia, anisopoikilocytosis, and a delay in childhood development. The disease is hereditary and autosomal recessive, and can be fatal in the early years of life.

There is also potential use for CAD protein as a target for treating certain tumors, as its role in pyrimidine synthesis can be manipulated to destroy cancer cells that are always growing and in need of new nucleotides. CAD can also be enhanced in order to increase certain types of cancer cells to chemotherapy. This has been shown to be specifically helpful in the treatment of triple-negative breast cancer (TNBC) in vitro and in vivo.
