= CPS1 =

CPS1 may refer to:

- CPS-1, the Capcom Play System 1
- Parry Sound Harbour Water Aerodrome, the IATA airport code
- Carbamoyl phosphate synthase, an enzyme
- CPS1 (gene), a gene that encodes carbamoyl phosphate synthase
