= Ornithine aminotransferase deficiency =

- Other names: Gyrate atrophy (of the choroid and retina)
- Ornithine
- Specialty: Ophthalmology, medical genetics

Ornithine aminotransferase deficiency (also known as gyrate atrophy of the choroid and retina) is an inborn error of ornithine metabolism, caused by decreased activity of the enzyme ornithine aminotransferase. Biochemically, it can be detected by elevated levels of ornithine in the blood. Clinically, it presents initially with poor night vision, which slowly progresses to total blindness. It is believed to be inherited in an autosomal recessive manner. Approximately 200 known cases have been reported in the literature. The incidence is highest in Finland, estimated at 1:50,000.

Research suggests there can be some adverse effect on muscles and also the brain. The cause of this is somewhat unclear but may relate to very low levels of creatine often found in this population.

Treatment may include vitamin B6, lysine or dramatic dietary change to minimise arginine from patients diet. Research has indicated that these treatments may be somewhat effective in lowering ornithine blood concentration levels in some patients, either in combination or individually. Vitamin B6 has been found to be very effective in a small proportion of patients.

== Presentation ==
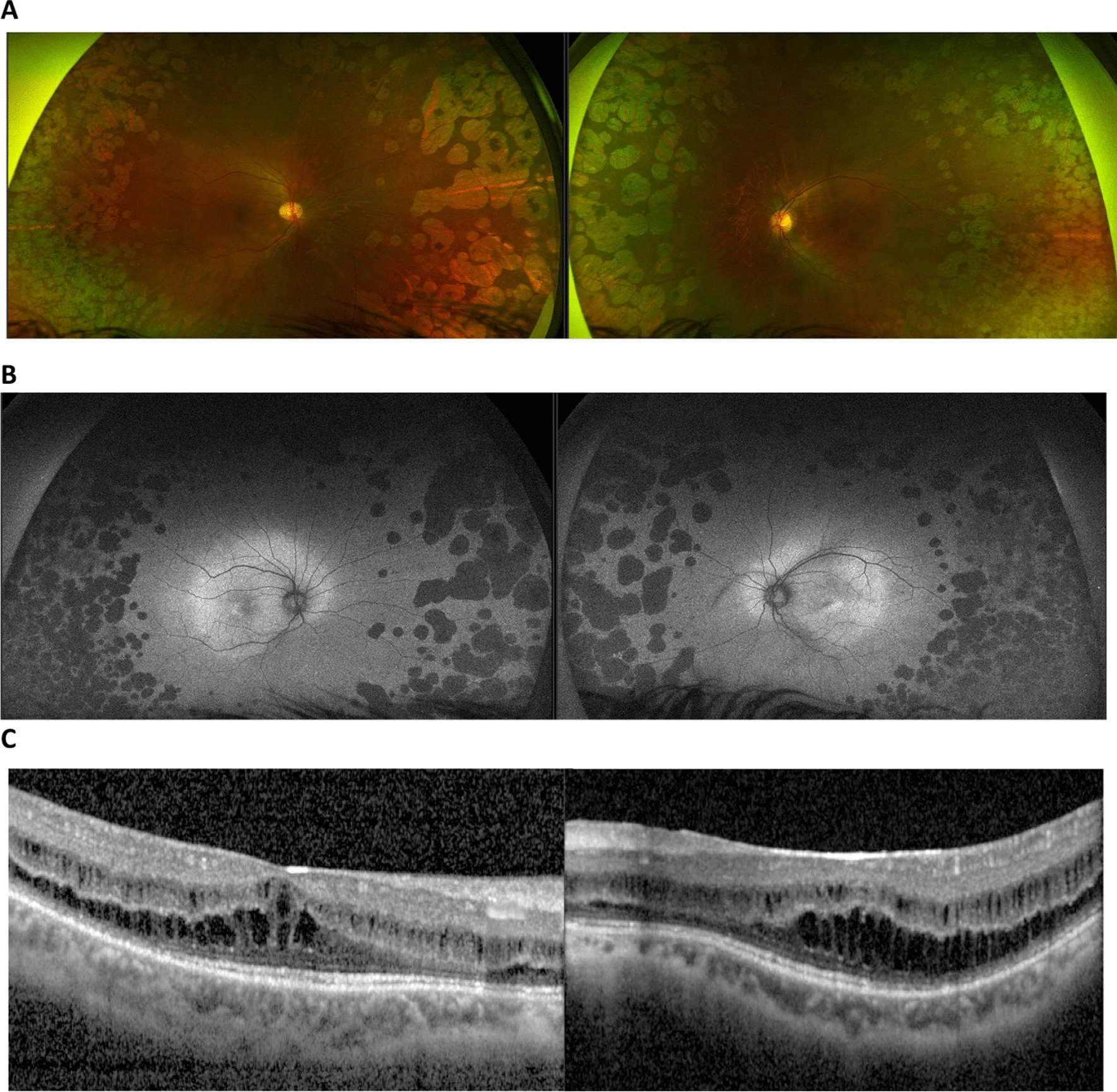
Colour fundus images shows characteristic bilateral scalloped, peripheral lesions, Fundus autofluorescence imaging demonstrating patchy hypo-autofluorescent lesions peripherally in keeping with retinal pigment epithelium atrophy. Optical coherence tomography images of the macula showing bilateral cystoid macular edema, a known complication of gyrate atrophy.

Quite often, the presenting symptom of ornithine aminotransferase (OAT) deficiency is myopia which progresses to night blindness. The onset of myopia is often in early childhood. Ophthalmological findings in affected individuals include constricted visual fields, posterior subcapsular cataracts (can begin in late teens), elevated dark adaptation thresholds and decreased or absent electroretinographic responses. Symptoms of OAT deficiency are progressive, and between the ages of 45 and 65, most affected individuals are almost completely blind.

In some cases, affected individuals will present in the neonatal period with disease that closely mimics a classic urea cycle defect, such as ornithine transcarbamylase deficiency, as the block in ornithine metabolism leads to secondary dysfunction of the urea cycle. These individuals present with hyperammonemia, poor feeding, failure to thrive and increased excretion of orotic acid.

== Genetics ==
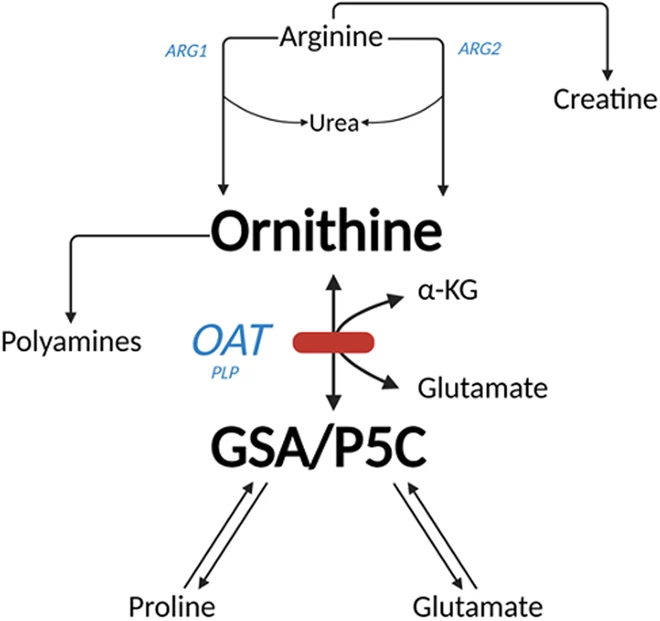
This illustration shows metabolism of ornithine by OAT. In gyrate atrophy, there are diminished levels of OAT (which is represented by a red line), which causes elevation of ornithine levels.

OAT deficiency is inherited in an autosomal recessive manner, meaning an affected individual must inherit a mutated allele from both parents. The enzyme, ornithine aminotransferase is coded for by the gene OAT, located at 10q26. OAT deficiency has an increased incidence in Finland, and this population has a common mutation accounting for more than 85% of mutant alleles in this population. It has not been described in any other populations.

=== Pathophysiology ===
Due to elevated levels of ornithine in RPE cells, it might interfere with proline uptake. Proline is used for metabolic processes in RPE, such as reductive carboxylation. Again, elevated ornithine levels stimulate polyamine synthesis, and because of this, there are elevated levels of hydrogen peroxide and acrolein in RPE.

Because of the ornithine-induced chronic toxicity in RPE, the outer blood-retina barrier breaks down, which might make the retina more permeable to toxic substances.

== Diagnosis ==
Upon clinical suspicion, diagnostic testing will often consist of measurement of amino acid concentrations in plasma, in search of a significantly elevated ornithine concentration. Measurement of urine amino acid concentrations is sometimes necessary, particularly in neonatal onset cases to identify the presence or absence of homocitrulline for ruling out ornithine translocase deficiency (hyperornithinemia, hyperammonemia, homocitrullinuria syndrome, HHH syndrome). Ornithine concentrations can be an unreliable indicator in the newborn period, thus newborn screening may not detect this condition, even if ornithine is included in the screening panel. Enzyme assays to measure the activity of ornithine aminotransferase can be performed from fibroblasts or lymphoblasts for confirmation or during the neonatal period when the results of biochemical testing is unclear. Molecular genetic testing is also an option.

== Treatment ==
To reduce the levels of ornithine in the blood, a diet restricted in arginine has been used. Some research has shown that when diet or other treatment is initiated early in life, the outcome can be improved.
