= Gelsinger =

Gelsinger is a surname. Notable people with the surname include:

- Jesse Gelsinger (1981–1999), American, the first person publicly identified as having died in a clinical trial for gene therapy
- Pat Gelsinger (born 1961), American author, CEO of Intel
