= Ornithine(lysine) transaminase =

ornithine(lysine) transaminase

Identifiers
- EC no.: 2.6.1.68
- CAS no.: 105542-39-0

Databases
- IntEnz: IntEnz view
- BRENDA: BRENDA entry
- ExPASy: NiceZyme view
- KEGG: KEGG entry
- MetaCyc: metabolic pathway
- PRIAM: profile
- PDB structures: RCSB PDB PDBe PDBsum
- Gene Ontology: AmiGO / QuickGO
Search
- PMC: articles
- PubMed: articles
- NCBI: proteins

In enzymology, an ornithine(lysine) transaminase (EC 2.6.1.68) is an enzyme that catalyzes the chemical reaction

L-ornithine + 2-oxoglutarate $\rightleftharpoons$ 3,4-dihydro-2H-pyrrole-2-carboxylate + L-glutamate + H_{2}O

Thus, the two substrates of this enzyme are L-ornithine and 2-oxoglutarate, whereas its 3 products are 3,4-dihydro-2H-pyrrole-2-carboxylate, L-glutamate, and H_{2}O.

This enzyme belongs to the family of transferases, specifically the transaminases, which run really fast to nitrogenous groups. The systematic name of this enzyme class is L-ornithine:2-oxoglutarate-aminotransferase. Other names in common use include ornithine(lysine) aminotransferase, lysine/ornithine:2-oxoglutarate aminotransferase, and L-ornithine(L-lysine):2-oxoglutarate-aminotransferase.
