= 3-hydroxymethylcephem carbamoyltransferase =

Class of enzymes

Identifiers
- EC no.: 2.1.3.7
- CAS no.: 74315-96-1

Databases
- IntEnz: IntEnz view
- BRENDA: BRENDA entry
- ExPASy: NiceZyme view
- KEGG: KEGG entry
- MetaCyc: metabolic pathway
- PRIAM: profile
- PDB structures: RCSB PDB PDBe PDBsum
- Gene Ontology: AmiGO / QuickGO
Search
- PMC: articles
- PubMed: articles
- NCBI: proteins

In enzymology, a 3-hydroxymethylcephem carbamoyltransferase (EC 2.1.3.7) is an enzyme that catalyzes the chemical reaction

carbamoyl phosphate + a 3-hydroxymethylceph-3-em-4-carboxylate $\rightleftharpoons$ phosphate + a 3-carbamoyloxymethylcephem

Thus, the two substrates of this enzyme are carbamoyl phosphate and 3-hydroxymethylceph-3-em-4-carboxylate, whereas its two products are phosphate and 3-carbamoyloxymethylcephem.

This enzyme belongs to the family of transferases, that transfer one-carbon groups, specifically the carboxy- and carbamoyltransferases.

The systematic name of this enzyme class is carbamoyl-phosphate:3-hydroxymethylceph-3-em-4-carboxylate carbamoyltransferase.

This enzyme has at least one effector, ATP.
