= Ornithine aminotransferase =

Class of enzymes

ornithine aminotransferase
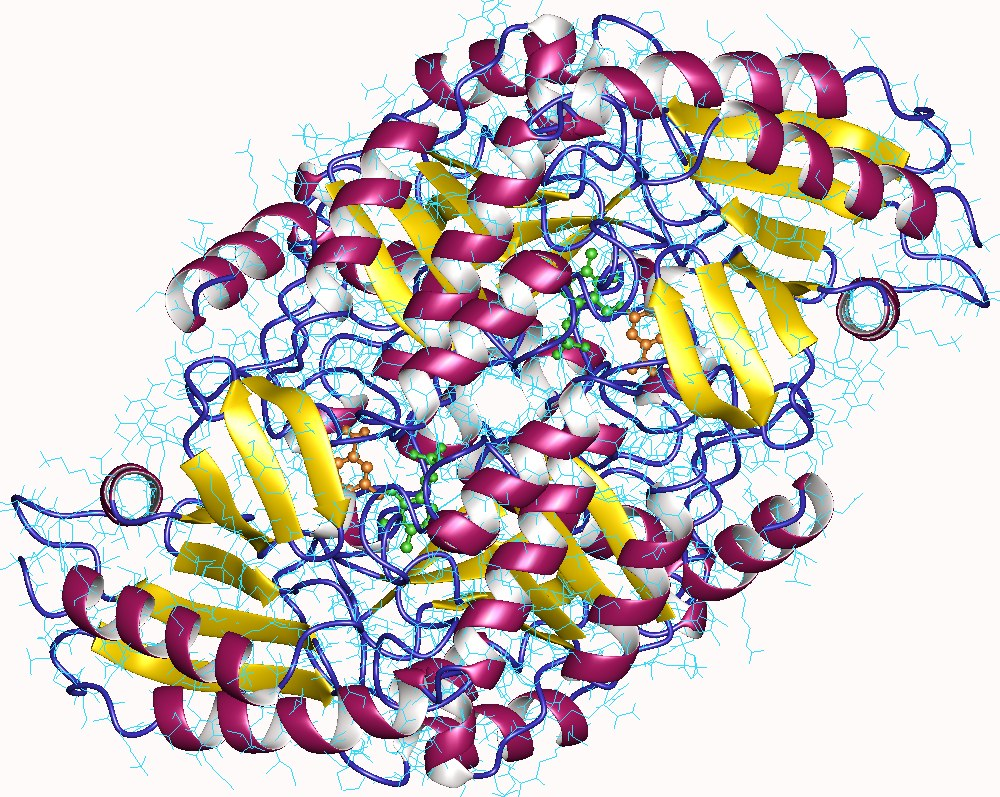
- OAT + PLP, Human

Identifiers
- EC no.: 2.6.1.13
- CAS no.: 9030-42-6

Databases
- BRENDA: enzyme data
- ExPASy: NiceZyme view
- KEGG: enzyme entry
- MetaCyc: metabolic pathway
- Rhea: reactions
- PDB structures: RCSB PDB PDBe PDBsum
- Gene Ontology: AmiGO / QuickGO
Search
- PMC: articles
- PubMed: articles
- NCBI: proteins

ornithine aminotransferase

Identifiers
- Symbol: OAT
- NCBI gene: 4942
- HGNC: 8091
- OMIM: 258870
- RefSeq: NM_000274
- UniProt: P04181

Other data
- EC number: 2.6.1.13
- Locus: Chr. 10 q26
Search for
- Structures: Swiss-model
- Domains: InterPro

Ornithine aminotransferase (OAT) is an enzyme which is encoded in human by the OAT gene located on chromosome 10.

OAT is involved in the ultimate formation of the non-essential amino acid proline from the amino acid ornithine. Ornithine aminotransferase forms the initial intermediate in this process. It catalyzes the reverse reaction as well, and is therefore essential in creating ornithine from the starting substrate proline.

== Structure ==
The OAT gene encodes for a protein that is approximately 46 kDa in size. The OAT protein is expressed primarily in the liver and the kidney but also in the brain and the retina. The OAT protein is localized to the mitochondrion within the cells where it is expressed.

The structure of the OAT protein has been resolved using X-ray crystallography and shows similarity to other subgroup 2 aminotransferases such as dialkyglucine decarboxylatse. The OAT protein functions as a dimer and each monomer consists of a large domain, which contributes most to subunit interface, and a C-terminal small domain, and an N-terminal region containing a helix, loop, and three-stranded beta-meander. In the central large domain is a seven-stranded beta-sheet covered by eight helices. The co-factor of the OAT protein (pyridoxal-5'-phosphate) binds to OAT through a Schiff base at the lysine 292 position situated between two of the seven-stranded beta-sheet. Three amino acids (R 180, E 235, and R413) are thought to be involved in substrate binding at the active site.

== Function ==
Ornithine aminotransferase catalyzes the transfer of the delta-amino group from L-ornithine

- L-ornithine + a 2-oxo acid = L-glutamate 5-semialdehyde + an L-amino acid

The reaction requires pyridoxal 5'-phosphate as a co-factor and forms part of the subpathway that synthesizes L-glutamate-5-semialdehyde from L-ornithine using α-ketoglutaric acid:

L-ornithine
+
α-ketoglutaric acid
glutamate-5-semialdehyde
+
L-glutamic acid

== Clinical significance ==
Mutations in the OAT gene can lead to malfunctioning proteins, including both point mutations that abolish catalytic activities, large frame-shift mutations, as well as mutated proteins that are not properly targeted to the mitochondrion where its normal functionality occurs. In the latter, abnormality of mitochondrial import causes ectopic accumulation of the OAT protein in the cytosol followed by rapid degradation by proteolysis. Deficiency of OAT activities causes ornithine aminotransferase deficiency, also known as gyrate atrophy of choroid and retina.

The mechanism of gyrate atrophy of choroid and retina is thought to involve the toxicity of glyoxylate.
