= CPS2 =

CPS2 may refer to:

- CP System II, the Capcom Play System 2
- Carbamoyl Phosphate Synthase II, the rate-limiting enzyme of pyrimidine biosynthesis
- Keene/Elmhirst's Resort Airport, Transport Canada airport code CPS2
- Control Performance Standard 2, North American Electric Reliability Corporation Frequency Control Performance Measure
