= Carbamoyl phosphate synthetase III =

Protein isoform

Carbamoyl phosphate synthetase III (CPS III) is one of the three isoforms of the carbamoyl phosphate synthetase, an enzyme that catalyzes the active production of carbamoyl phosphate in many organisms.

CPS III (EC 6.3.5.5.) is a ligase (3.) that forms carbon-nitrogen bonds (6.3.) with glutamine as amido-N-donor (6.3.5.) (see BRENDA).

== Context ==
Many aquatic organisms, including most fish species, are ammoniotelic, meaning that they produce ammonia as metabolic waste and excrete by diffusion through their gills. Similar to terrestrial vertebrates, some fish species also produce urea as metabolic waste. This occurs in larvae stages since they do not have gills to excrete ammonia from, but also the adult stage in some species. Based on the proportion of metabolic waste represented by urea, these species are partial or fully ureotelic.

Ureotelic species produce urea via the ornithine-urea cycle (OUC) in which CPS plays an important role. Carbamoyl phosphate synthetase I is used primarily by terrestrial vertebrates, while some aquatic species rely on CPS III to deal for urea production. There are several potential advantages in excreting urea instead of ammonia for species living in specific environments. For example, it allows a better diffusion capacity than ammonia in alkaline waters, and it decreases water loss, which can be crucial for species experiencing long periods out of the water such as lungfish species. CPS III has been described in cichlids of the Alcolapia genus, lungfishes, the Gulf toadfish Opsanus beta, the rainbow trout Oncorhyncus mykiss, the Atlantic halibut Hippoglossus hippoglossus, the largemouth bass Micropterus salmoides, the common carp Cyprinus carpio, and in elasmobranchs such as the spiny dogfish Squalus acanthia for example. This enzyme thus seems to be distributed among fish showing different degree of ureotely.

== Reaction pathway ==
=== Ornithine-urea cycle ===
CPS III is a precursor in the ornithine-urea cycle (OUC). This pathway occurs in organisms which do not directly excrete ammonia as a catabolic waste. The main function of the OUC is to convert highly toxic nitrogen waste (NH_{3}) in urea, which shows less toxicity. This cycle includes five biochemical reactions, the first two of which occur in the mitochondrial matrix and the three others in the cytosol. In fishes, the urea cycle is only found in a few teleosts, mostly air breeders or species living in very specific environments such as alkaline water, and in elasmobranchs.

CPS III is found in the mitochondria of some elasmobranch and in a few teleosts liver and/or extrahepatic tissues. It intervenes in the first reaction of the cycle of the OUC, which is crucial since it limits the rest of the cycle. CPS III thus plays a major role in regulating the amount of ammonia in the cell, by starting its conversion in urea for excretion while maintaining a minimum concentration to maintain amino acids synthesis.

=== Carbamoyl phosphate synthesis ===
The reaction catalyzed by CPS III is: 2 ATP + L-glutamine + HCO_{3}^{−} + H_{2}O → 2 ADP + P_{i} + L-glutamate + carbamoyl phosphate

This reaction occurs in the mitochondrial matrix and includes four steps:

1. Bicarbonate (HCO_{3}^{−}) is phosphorylated using an ATP, generating carboxyphosphate (CHO_{6}P^{2-})
2. Glutamine (C_{5}H_{10}N_{2}O_{3}) is hydrolyzed into glutamate (C_{5}H_{9}NO_{4}) and ammonia (NH_{3}). 1. and 2. occur concurrently.
3. Nucleophilic substitution of the ammonia on carboxyphosphate (substituting the -OH group by a -NH_{2} group) generating the intermediate product carbamate (CH_{2}NO_{2}^{−})
4. Nucleophilic substitution of the carbamate on a second ATP, generating the product carbamoyl phosphate (CH_{2}NO_{5}P^{2−}).

CPS III, like CPS I, shows N-acetylglutamate dependence, which means that this allosteric effector is required to perform the catalysis.

== Structure ==
CPS III is composed of two subunits: a synthetase and a glutaminase. These two subunits seem to be fused by the N-terminal end of the synthetase (Hong et al., 1994)

The 38 first amino acids of the sequence (N-terminal sequence) represent a mitochondrial signal sequence to signal import in the mitochondria.

The glutaminase subunit is located between Phe39 and Ile407 and is itself divided into two domains: an N-terminal domain between Phe39 and Asp165, and a C-terminal glutamine amide transferase domain (GAT) located between Thr166 and Ile407. The cysteine residue Cyst294 along with three histidine residues Hist337, Hist367, and Hist378, have been identified as crucial for the glutamine-dependent activity. In other words, these residues allow CPS III to use glutamine as a substrate.

The synthetase subunit stretches from Lys425 to Gln15032 (C-terminal end) and is also composed of two domains. The first one is located between Lys425 and Ile977 and the second one between Met978 and Gln1502. Each may contain an ATP binding site located between Arg719 and Asp768, and between Arg1260 and Ile1304. It is believed that the C-terminal region contains the binding site for the fixation of the allosteric effector N-acetylglutamate (NAG) which is required for CPS III to function. Two cysteines Cys1328 and Cys1338 have been identified in CPS I, which also use NAG as an allosteric effector, but not in CPS II, which activity is not affected by NAG. Thus, these two cysteine residues appear to probably play a crucial role in the allosteric activity of CPS III.

== Evolution and relationship with CPS I and CPS II ==
CPS III is closer to CPS I than CPS II. These two enzymes work the same way and use the same allosteric effector. The difference between them is that CPS III uses glutamine as substrate while CPS I use ammonia.

It is believed that these enzymes evolved from each other. One hypothesis is that CPS II appeared first after the fusion of genes coding for a glutaminase and an ammonia-dependent synthetase. CPS III would then result from the duplication of the glutaminase sequence, creating a second glutamine binding site that evolved into the N-acetylglutamate allosteric site. The last type, CPS I would be the last one to appear after evolving in using ammonia as substrate instead of glutamine.
