= Mitochondrial ornithine transporter 1 =

Protein found in humans

SLC25A15

Identifiers
- Aliases: SLC25A15, D13S327, HHH, ORC1, ORNT1, solute carrier family 25 member 15, LNC-HC
- External IDs: OMIM: 603861; MGI: 1342274; GeneCards: SLC25A15

Gene location (Human)
Chr.	Chromosome 13 (human)
Band	13q14.11	Start	40,789,412 bp
Band	13q14.11	End	40,812,460 bp

Gene location (Mouse)
Chr.	Chromosome 8 (mouse)
Band	8|8 A2	Start	22,865,567 bp
Band	8|8 A2	End	22,888,613 bp
RNA expression pattern
Bgee	Human / Mouse (ortholog); Top expressed in: liver; right lobe of liver; duodenum; jejunal mucosa; body of pancreas; testicle; gonad; mucosa of ileum; stromal cell of endometrium; thyroid gland / Top expressed in: epithelium of small intestine; left lobe of liver; Ileal epithelium; Paneth cell; jejunum; migratory enteric neural crest cell; primary oocyte; human kidney; right kidney; proximal tubule; More reference expression data
BioGPS	n/a
Gene ontology
Molecular function	L-ornithine transmembrane transporter activity; transmembrane transporter activity
Cellular component	membrane; mitochondrion; mitochondrial inner membrane; integral component of membrane
Biological process	urea cycle; mitochondrial transport; mitochondrial L-ornithine transmembrane transport
Sources:Amigo / QuickGO
Orthologs
Databases	NCBI: entry; OMA: entry
Species	Human	Mouse
Entrez	10166	18408
Ensembl	ENSG00000102743	ENSMUSG00000031482
UniProt	Q9Y619	Q9WVD5
RefSeq (mRNA)	NM_014252	NM_181325; NM_001358971
RefSeq (protein)	NP_055067	NP_851842; NP_001345900
Location (UCSC)	Chr 13: 40.79 – 40.81 Mb	Chr 8: 22.87 – 22.89 Mb
PubMed search
- Wikidata
View/Edit Human	View/Edit Mouse

Mitochondrial ornithine transporter 1 is a protein that in humans is encoded by the SLC25A15 gene. It is responsible for transporting ornithine from the cytosol into the mitochondria in the urea cycle. In humans, it is highly expressed in the liver and pancreas, unlike the related Mitochondrial ornithine transporter 2 (SLC25A2) which is instead expressed primarily in the testis.

== Pathology ==
A disorder is associated with ornithine translocase deficiency, and a form of hyperammonemia.

== See also ==
- Translocase
