= N5-(carboxyethyl)ornithine synthase =

Class of enzymes

Identifiers
- EC no.: 1.5.1.24
- CAS no.: 129070-70-8

Databases
- IntEnz: IntEnz view
- BRENDA: BRENDA entry
- ExPASy: NiceZyme view
- KEGG: KEGG entry
- MetaCyc: metabolic pathway
- PRIAM: profile
- PDB structures: RCSB PDB PDBe PDBsum
- Gene Ontology: AmiGO / QuickGO
Search
- PMC: articles
- PubMed: articles
- NCBI: proteins

In enzymology, N5-(carboxyethyl)ornithine synthase (EC 1.5.1.24) is an enzyme that catalyzes the chemical reaction

N(5)-(L-1-carboxyethyl)-L-ornithine
+ NADP^{+}
H_{2}O
H^{+}
H_{2}O
H^{+}
ornithine
+ NADPH +
pyruvic acid

The three substrates of this enzyme are N5-(L-1-carboxyethyl)-L-ornithine, oxidised nicotinamide adenine dinucleotide phosphate (NADP^{+}), and water. Its products are L-ornithine, reduced NADPH, pyruvic acid, and a proton.

== Nomenclature ==
This enzyme belongs to the family of oxidoreductases, specifically those acting on the CH-NH group of donors with NAD+ or NADP+ as acceptor. The systematic name of this enzyme class is N5-(L-1-carboxyethyl)-L-ornithine:NADP+ oxidoreductase (L-ornithine-forming). Other names in common use include 5-N-(L-1-carboxyethyl)-L-ornithine:NADP+ oxidoreductase, and (L-ornithine-forming).
