= CPS1 (gene) =

Protein-coding gene in humans

Identifiers
- Aliases: CPS1, PHN, carbamoyl-phosphate synthase 1, CPSASE1, GATD6
- External IDs: OMIM: 608307; MGI: 891996; GeneCards: CPS1
Available structures
PDB	Ortholog search: A0A3T0V883 PDBe A0A3T0V883 RCSB
PDB	List of PDB id codes 2YVQ, 5DOU, 5DOT, 4UUA, 4UTV, 4UTR, 4UUB, 4UU8, 4UTZ, 4UU7
Enzyme activity
EC #	BRENDA	ExPASy	KEGG	MetaCyc
6.3.4.16	↗	↗	↗	↗

Gene location (Human)
Chr.	Chromosome 2 (human)
Band	2q34	Start	210,477,682 bp
Band	2q34	End	210,679,107 bp

Gene location (Mouse)
Chr.	Chromosome 1 (mouse)
Band	1 C3|1 33.75 cM	Start	67,162,185 bp
Band	1 C3|1 33.75 cM	End	67,270,418 bp
RNA expression pattern
Bgee	Human / Mouse (ortholog); Top expressed in: liver; right lobe of liver; jejunal mucosa; duodenum; buccal mucosa cell; mucosa of ileum; secondary oocyte; internal globus pallidus; gonad; male germ cell / Top expressed in: left lobe of liver; epithelium of small intestine; migratory enteric neural crest cell; Ileal epithelium; Paneth cell; gallbladder; crypt of lieberkuhn of small intestine; jejunum; duodenum; sexually immature organism; More reference expression data
BioGPS	n/a
Gene ontology
Molecular function	nucleotide binding; calcium ion binding; endopeptidase activity; metal ion binding; ligase activity; modified amino acid binding; catalytic activity; protein binding; phospholipid binding; ATP binding; glutamate binding; carbamoyl-phosphate synthase (ammonia) activity; carbamoyl-phosphate synthase (glutamine-hydrolyzing) activity; protein-containing complex binding; aspartate carbamoyltransferase activity; dihydroorotase activity
Cellular component	cytoplasm; mitochondrial matrix; mitochondrion; mitochondrial inner membrane; mitochondrial nucleoid; nucleus; nucleolus; protein-containing complex
Biological process	response to amino acid; response to glucagon; anion homeostasis; response to steroid hormone; cellular response to glucagon stimulus; hepatocyte differentiation; response to zinc ion; nitrogen compound metabolic process; response to glucocorticoid; cellular response to fibroblast growth factor stimulus; proteolysis; response to dexamethasone; triglyceride catabolic process; nitric oxide metabolic process; response to lipopolysaccharide; glutamine metabolic process; carbamoyl phosphate biosynthetic process; response to amine; response to growth hormone; response to food; response to starvation; liver development; metabolism; response to cAMP; homocysteine metabolic process; response to toxic substance; citrulline biosynthetic process; response to oleic acid; cellular response to cAMP; cellular response to oleic acid; midgut development; 'de novo' pyrimidine nucleobase biosynthetic process; vasodilation; urea cycle; arginine biosynthetic process
Sources:Amigo / QuickGO
Orthologs
Databases	NCBI: entry; OMA: entry
Species	Human	Mouse
Entrez	1373	227231
Ensembl	ENSG00000021826	ENSMUSG00000025991
UniProt	P31327	Q8C196
RefSeq (mRNA)	NM_001122633; NM_001122634; NM_001875; NM_001369256; NM_001369257	NM_001080809
RefSeq (protein)	NP_001116105; NP_001866; NP_001356185; NP_001356186	NP_001074278
Location (UCSC)	Chr 2: 210.48 – 210.68 Mb	Chr 1: 67.16 – 67.27 Mb
PubMed search
- Wikidata
View/Edit Human	View/Edit Mouse

Carbamoyl-phosphate synthase 1 is an protein that in humans is encoded by the CPS1.

== Function ==
Carbamoyl phosphate synthetase I, is a mitochondrial enzyme that catalyzes the first and rate-limiting step of the urea cycle through converting ammonia and bicarbonate into carbamoyl phosphate. This reaction enables the removal of excess nitrogen from the body by converting toxic ammonia into urea, which is then excreted by the kidneys.

== Clnical significance ==
Mutations in the CPS1 gene can lead to carbamoyl phosphate synthetase I deficiency, an inherited metabolic disorder that causes hyperammonemia.
