= Putrescine carbamoyltransferase =

Enzyme

putrescine carbamoyltransferase

Identifiers
- EC no.: 2.1.3.6
- CAS no.: 9076-55-5

Databases
- IntEnz: IntEnz view
- BRENDA: BRENDA entry
- ExPASy: NiceZyme view
- KEGG: KEGG entry
- MetaCyc: metabolic pathway
- PRIAM: profile
- PDB structures: RCSB PDB PDBe PDBsum
- Gene Ontology: AmiGO / QuickGO
Search
- PMC: articles
- PubMed: articles
- NCBI: proteins

In enzymology, a putrescine carbamoyltransferase (EC 2.1.3.6) is an enzyme that catalyzes the chemical reaction:

carbamoyl phosphate
+
putrescine
H_{2}PO^{−}_{4}
H_{2}PO^{−}_{4}
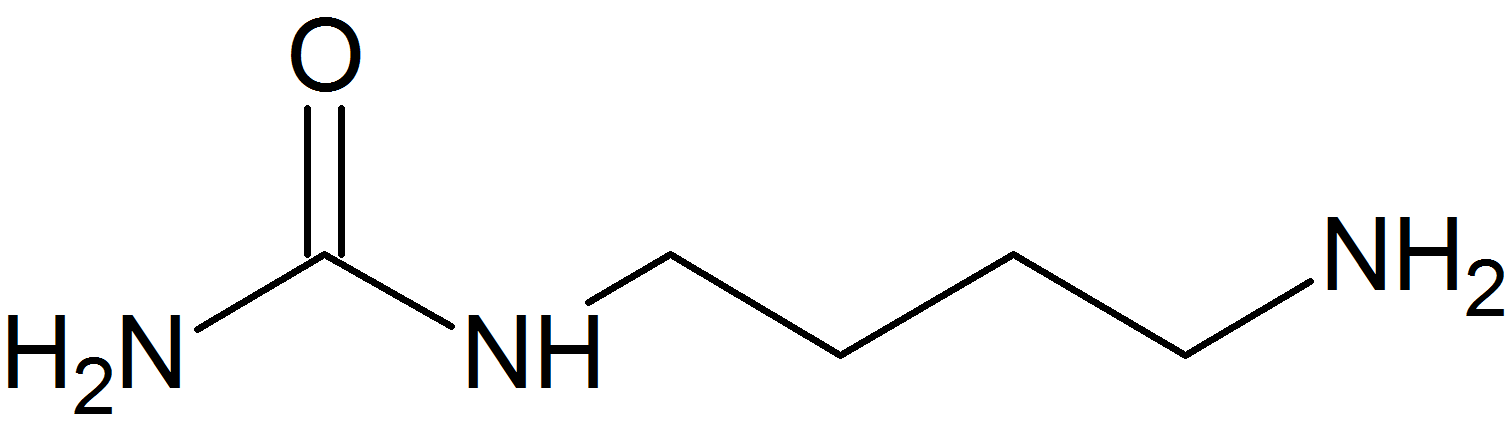
N-carbamoylputrescine

This enzyme belongs to the family of transferases that transfer one-carbon groups, specifically the carboxy- and carbamoyltransferases. The systematic name of this enzyme class is carbamoyl-phosphate:putrescine carbamoyltransferase. Other names in common use include PTCase, putrescine synthase, and putrescine transcarbamylase.
