= CPS II =

CPS II may refer to any of the following.

- CP System II, an arcade system board developed by Capcom
- Carbamoyl phosphate synthase II, a catalyzing enzyme
