= CPS3 =

CPS3 may refer to:

- CP System III, an arcade system board
- Carbamoyl phosphate synthetase III, an enzyme
- Parry Sound (Portage Lake) Water Aerodrome, Canadian Location Identifier CPS3
