= Lysine carbamoyltransferase =

Class of enzymes

lysine carbamoyltransferase

Identifiers
- EC no.: 2.1.3.8
- CAS no.: 86352-19-4

Databases
- IntEnz: IntEnz view
- BRENDA: BRENDA entry
- ExPASy: NiceZyme view
- KEGG: KEGG entry
- MetaCyc: metabolic pathway
- PRIAM: profile
- PDB structures: RCSB PDB PDBe PDBsum
- Gene Ontology: AmiGO / QuickGO
Search
- PMC: articles
- PubMed: articles
- NCBI: proteins

In enzymology, a lysine carbamoyltransferase (EC 2.1.3.8) is an enzyme that catalyzes the chemical reaction

carbamoyl phosphate
+
L-lysine
H_{2}PO^{−}_{4}
H_{2}PO^{−}_{4}
L-homocitrulline

The substrates of this enzyme are carbamoyl phosphate and L-lysine, and it produces L-homocitrulline.

This enzyme belongs to the family of transferases that transfer one-carbon groups, specifically the carboxy- and carbamoyltransferases. The systematic name of this enzyme class is carbamoyl-phosphate:L-lysine carbamoyltransferase. This enzyme is also called lysine transcarbamylase.
