= AOTC =

AOTC may refer to:

- American Opportunity Tax Credit, a partially refundable tax credit detailed in Section 1004 of the American Recovery and Reinvestment Act of 2009
- Star Wars: Episode II – Attack of the Clones, a Star Wars film
- N-acetylornithine carbamoyltransferase, an enzyme
