= Ornithine translocase deficiency =

- Other names: HHH syndrome, ORNT1 deficiency, ornithine carrier deficiency, triple H syndrome
- Ornithine

Ornithine translocase deficiency, also called hyperornithinemia-hyperammonemia-homocitrullinuria (HHH) syndrome, is a rare autosomal recessive urea cycle disorder affecting the enzyme ornithine translocase, which causes ammonia to accumulate in the blood, a condition called hyperammonemia.

Ammonia, which is formed when proteins are broken down in the body, is toxic if the levels become too high. The nervous system is especially sensitive to the effects of excess ammonia.

== Pathophysiology ==
Ornithine translocase deficiency has an autosomal recessive pattern of inheritance.

Mutations in SLC25A15 cause ornithine translocase deficiency. Ornithine translocase deficiency belongs to a class of metabolic disorders referred to as urea cycle disorders. The urea cycle is a sequence of reactions that occurs in liver cells. This cycle processes excess nitrogen, generated when protein is used by the body, to make a compound called urea that is excreted by the kidneys. The SLC25A15 gene provides instructions for making a protein called a mitochondrial ornithine transporter. This protein is needed to move a molecule called ornithine within the mitochondria (the energy-producing centers in cells). Specifically, this protein transports ornithine across the inner membrane of mitochondria to the region called the mitochondrial matrix, where it participates in the urea cycle. Mutations in the SLC25A15 gene result in a mitochondrial ornithine transporter that is unstable or the wrong shape, and which cannot bring ornithine to the mitochondrial matrix. This failure of ornithine transport causes an interruption of the urea cycle and the accumulation of ammonia, resulting in the signs and symptoms of ornithine translocase deficiency.

This disorder is inherited in an autosomal recessive pattern, which means the defective gene is located on an autosome, and two copies of the gene - one from each parent - are required to be born with the disorder. The parents of an individual with an autosomal recessive disorder each carry one copy of the altered gene but do not show signs and symptoms of the disorder.

== Diagnosis ==
Clinical findings in HHH syndrome are non-specific. If the disorder is suspected, laboratory testing can provide diagnostic information. Plasma amino acid analysis will show elevated ornithine levels, and urine amino acids will detect homocitrulline. Orotic acid may also be elevated. Ammonia levels can be variably elevated. If these findings are present, molecular testing may provide additional confirmatory information.

== Treatment ==
Treatments include discontinuation of protein intake, intravenous infusion of glucose and, as needed, infusion of supplemental arginine and the ammonia removal drugs, sodium phenylacetate and sodium benzoate.

== See also ==
- Ornithine transcarbamylase deficiency
- Inborn errors of metabolism
- Ornithine aminotransferase deficiency (gyrate atrophy of the choroid and retina)
