= Homocitrulline =

Names
- IUPAC name L-Homocitrulline
- Systematic IUPAC name (2S)-2-Amino-6-(carbamoylamino)hexanoic acid
- Other names N^{6}-carbamoyl-L-lysine, N^{6}-(aminocarbonyl)-L-lysine

Identifiers
CAS Number	1190-49-4
3D model (JSmol)	Interactive image
ChEBI	CHEBI:17443
ChemSpider	58582
ECHA InfoCard	100.013.384
EC Number	214-722-0
KEGG	C02427
PubChem CID	65072
UNII	133T7A0Y5K
CompTox Dashboard (EPA)	DTXSID301317386
- InChI: InChI=1S/C7H15N3O3/c8-5(6(11)12)3-1-2-4-10-7(9)13/h5H,1-4,8H2,(H,11,12)(H3,9,10,13)/t5-/m0/s1 Key: XIGSAGMEBXLVJJ-YFKPBYRVSA-N; InChI=1/C7H15N3O3/c8-5(6(11)12)3-1-2-4-10-7(9)13/h5H,1-4,8H2,(H,11,12)(H3,9,10,13)/t5-/m0/s1 Key: XIGSAGMEBXLVJJ-YFKPBYRVBI
- SMILES: C(CCNC(=O)N)C[C@@H](C(=O)O)N

Properties
Chemical formula	C_{7}H_{15}N_{3}O_{3}
Molar mass	189.215 g·mol^{−1}
- Except where otherwise noted, data are given for materials in their standard state (at 25 °C [77 °F], 100 kPa). Infobox references

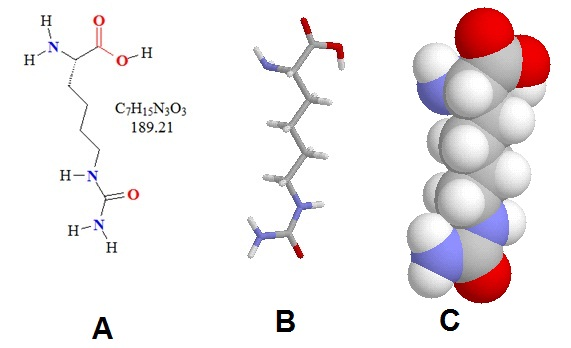
Structural models for homocitrulline. A: Chemical structure; B: Stick model, energy minimized; C: Space filling model.

L-Homocitrulline is an amino acid and can be detected in larger amounts in the urine of individuals with urea cycle disorders. At present, it is thought that the depletion of the ornithine supply causes the accumulation of carbamyl-phosphate in the urea cycle which may be responsible for the enhanced synthesis of homocitrulline and homoarginine. Both amino acids can be detected in urine. Amino acid analysis allows for the quantitative analysis of these amino acid metabolites in biological fluids such as urine or blood.

== Description ==
Homocitrulline is one methylene group longer than citrulline, but similar in structure. The metabolite is generated from a lysine residue after lysine reacts with cyanate. Cyanate is present in the human body in equilibrium with urea. Under physiological conditions the urea concentration may be too low to allow extensive carbamylation. However, the conversion process leading to the formation of homocitrulline from lysine in proteins is known to occur in vivo. During renal failure conditions, the urea concentration increases and carbamylation of many proteins can occur, which can be detected. It is believed that most carbamylation takes place during inflammation when the enzyme myeloperoxidase is released from neutrophils. This enzyme converts thiocyanate to cyanate. Increased levels of cyanate can now carbamylate lysine residues.

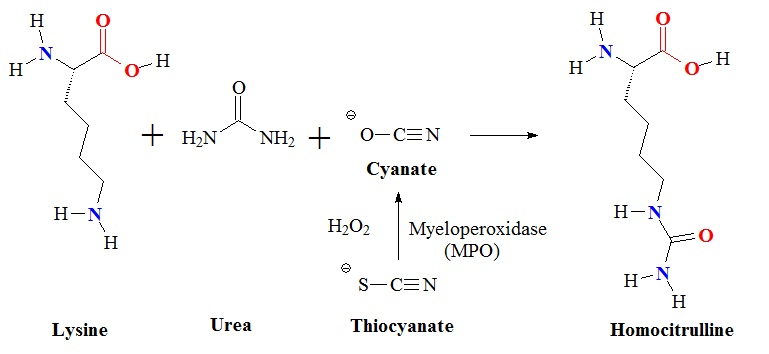
Carbamylation of lysine.

Myeloperoxidase released from neutrophils converts thiocyanate to cyanate which carbamylates lysine residues to form homocitrulline. Thiocyanate (SCN^{−}) is a naturally occurring pseudohalide found in dietary sources. Myeloperoxidase can use SCN^{−} as a cosubstrate together with hydrogen peroxide (H_{2}O_{2}) to form cyanate. In patients with kidney dysfunction urea is elevated. Urea is in equilibrium with cyanate and isocyanate. Carbamylation of nucleophilic amino groups, for example lysine residues, can modify protein structures and ultimately cause metabolic dysfunctions.

== In diseases ==
Homocitrulline has been suggested as a confounding antigen for rheumatoid arthritis antibodies targeting citrullinated proteins/peptides. Antibodies binding to homocitrulline-containing sequences have been found in rheumatoid arthritis patients' sera More recently, it has been shown that homocitrulline-containing proteins are present in rheumatoid arthritis (RA) joints. In rodents they may affect T-cell triggering and possibly autoantibody formation, and possibly also in humans.

In another metabolic disorder, in the hyperornithinemia-hyperammonemia-homocitrullinuria (HHH) syndrome, first described in 1969, ornithine levels maybe elevated five to ten times in comparison to normal levels. In addition, in this syndrome, levels of alanine, orotic acid and homocitrulline may be elevated as well. In people with hyperammonemia orotic acid and homocitrulline appear to be chronically elevated after a high protein diet, but may be normal when fasting.

The metabolic disorder, lysinuric protein intolerance is caused by the body's inability to digest and use certain protein building blocks or amino acids. These are lysine, arginine, and ornithine. These amino acids are found in many protein-rich foods. Since in this disorder the human body cannot effectively break down these amino acids people typically experience nausea and vomiting after ingesting protein rich foods. Associated features of this protein intolerance may include an enlarged liver and spleen, short stature, muscle weakness, impaired immune function, and progressively brittle bones that are prone to fracture and a lung disorder called pulmonary alveolar proteinosis may also develop. In addition, the accumulation of amino acids in the kidneys can cause end-stage renal disease (ESRD). In ESRD the kidneys are no longer able to filter fluids and waste products from the body effectively.

== Bibliography ==
1. Dionisi Vici C, Bachmann C, Gambarara M, Colombo JP, Sabetta G: Hyperornithinemia-hyperammonemia-homocitrullinuria syndrome: low creatine excretion and effect of citrulline, arginine, or ornithine supplement. Pediatr Res. 1987 Sep;22(3):364-7.
2. Evered DF, Vadgama JV: Absorption of homocitrulline from the gastrointestinal tract. Br J Nutr. 1983 Jan;49(1):35-42.
3. Hommes FA, Roesel RA, Metoki K, Hartlage PL, Dyken PR: Studies on a case of HHH-syndrome (hyperammonemia, hyperornithinemia, homocitrullinuria). Neuropediatrics. 1986 Feb;17(1):48-52.
4. Kato T, Sano M, Mizutani N.; Homocitrullinuria and homoargininuria in lysinuric protein intolerance. J Inherit Metab Dis. 1989;12(2):157-61.
5. Kato T, Sano M, Mizutani N: Inhibitory effect of intravenous lysine infusion on urea cycle metabolism. Eur J Pediatr. 1987 Jan;146(1):56-8. Pubmed: 3107993.
6. Kato T, Sano M, Mizutani N, Hayakawa C: Homocitrullinuria and homoargininuria in hyperargininaemia. J Inherit Metab Dis. 1988;11(3):261-5.
7. Kato T, Sano M: Effect of ammonium chloride on homocitrulline and homoarginine synthesis from lysine. J Inherit Metab Dis. 1993;16(5):906-7.
8. Kato T, Sano M, Mizutani N: Homocitrullinuria and homoargininuria in lysinuric protein intolerance. J Inherit Metab Dis. 1989;12(2):157-61.
9. Koshiishi I, Kobori Y, Imanari T: Determination of citrulline and homocitrulline by high-performance liquid chromatography with post-column derivatization. J Chromatogr. 1990 Oct 26;532(1):37-43.
10. Kraus LM, Gaber L, Handorf CR, Marti HP, Kraus AP Jr: Carbamoylation of glomerular and tubular proteins in patients with kidney failure: a potential mechanism of ongoing renal damage. Swiss Med Wkly. 2001 Mar 24;131(11-12):139-4.
11. Kraus LM, Elberger AJ, Handorf CR, Pabst MJ, Kraus AP Jr: Urea-derived cyanate forms epsilon-amino-carbamoyl-lysine (homocitrulline) in leukocyte proteins in patients with end-stage renal disease on peritoneal dialysis. J Lab Clin Med. 1994 Jun;123(6):882-91.
12. Rajantie J, Simell O, Perheentupa J: Oral administration of epsilon N-acetyllysine and homocitrulline in lysinuric protein intolerance. J Pediatr. 1983 Mar;102(3):388-90
13. Simell O, Mackenzie S, Clow CL, Scriver CR: Ornithine loading did not prevent induced hyperammonemia in a patient with hyperornithinemia-hyperammonemia-homocitrullinuria syndrome. Pediatr Res. 1985 Dec;19(12):1283-7.
14. Tuchman M, Knopman DS, Shih VE: Episodic hyperammonemia in adult siblings with hyperornithinemia, hyperammonemia, and homocitrullinuria syndrome. Arch Neurol. 1990 Oct;47(10):1134-7.
15. Zammarchi E, Donati MA, Filippi L, Resti M: Cryptogenic hepatitis masking the diagnosis of ornithine transcarbamylase deficiency. J Pediatr Gastroenterol Nutr. 1996 May;22(4):380-3.
