= Bisorcic =

Liver-protective and stimulant drug

Clinical data
- Other names: N^{2},N^{5}-Diacetyl-L-ornithine; N^{2},N^{5}-Diacetylornithine; N^{α},N^{δ}-Diacetylornithine
- Routes of administration: Oral
- Drug class: Hepatoprotective agent; Psychostimulant

Identifiers
- IUPAC name: (2S)-2,5-diacetamidopentanoic acid
- CAS Number: 39825-23-5
- PubChem CID: 65977
- ChemSpider: 59375
- UNII: 3V77J79MIF
- ChEBI: CHEBI:133217
- ChEMBL: ChEMBL3989425
- CompTox Dashboard (EPA): DTXSID50960387
- ECHA InfoCard: 100.049.659

Chemical and physical data
- Formula: C_{9}H_{16}N_{2}O_{4}
- Molar mass: 216.237 g·mol^{−1}
- 3D model (JSmol): Interactive image
- SMILES: CC(=O)NCCC[C@@H](C(=O)O)NC(=O)C
- InChI: InChI=1S/C9H16N2O4/c1-6(12)10-5-3-4-8(9(14)15)11-7(2)13/h8H,3-5H2,1-2H3,(H,10,12)(H,11,13)(H,14,15)/t8-/m0/s1; Key:XUYANFPPYJSBPU-QMMMGPOBSA-N

Bisorcic (INN), also known as N^{2},N^{5}-diacetyl-L-ornithine, is a drug described as a hepatoprotective agent and "psychostimulant" which has been used in France in the treatment of asthenia. It is the N^{2},N^{5}-diacetylated derivative of the amino acid L-ornithine.

Bisorcic was first described in the literature in 1973 in a German patent. The INN was designated around 1975. The drug was marketed in France by Astyl-Gallier in 1987. It was provided in the form of 200 mg oral capsules and four capsules were taken daily.

L-Ornithine, as the combination drug L-ornithine L-aspartate (LOLA), has been used in the treatment of hepatic encephalopathy and cirrhosis and is likewise described as hepatoprotective. It is thought to work by participating in the urea cycle and lowering ammonia levels.
