= D-alanine—D-alanine ligase =

Enzyme belonging to the ligase family

D-Alanine—D-alanine ligase

Identifiers
- EC no.: 6.3.2.4
- CAS no.: 9023-63-6

Databases
- IntEnz: IntEnz view
- BRENDA: BRENDA entry
- ExPASy: NiceZyme view
- KEGG: KEGG entry
- MetaCyc: metabolic pathway
- PRIAM: profile
- PDB structures: RCSB PDB PDBe PDBsum
- Gene Ontology: AmiGO / QuickGO
Search
- PMC: articles
- PubMed: articles
- NCBI: proteins

D-ala D-ala ligase N-terminus
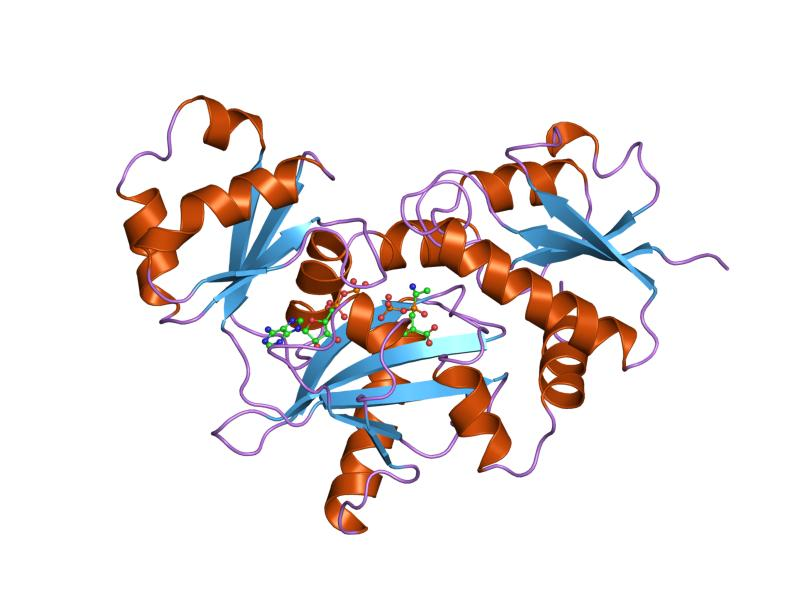
- complex of y216f d-ala:d-ala ligase with adp and a phosphoryl phosphinate

Identifiers
- Symbol: Dala_Dala_lig_N
- Pfam: PF01820
- InterPro: IPR011127
- SCOP2: 2dln / SCOPe / SUPFAM
Available protein structures:
- Pfam: structures / ECOD
- PDB: RCSB PDB; PDBe; PDBj
- PDBsum: structure summary

D-ala D-ala ligase C-terminus
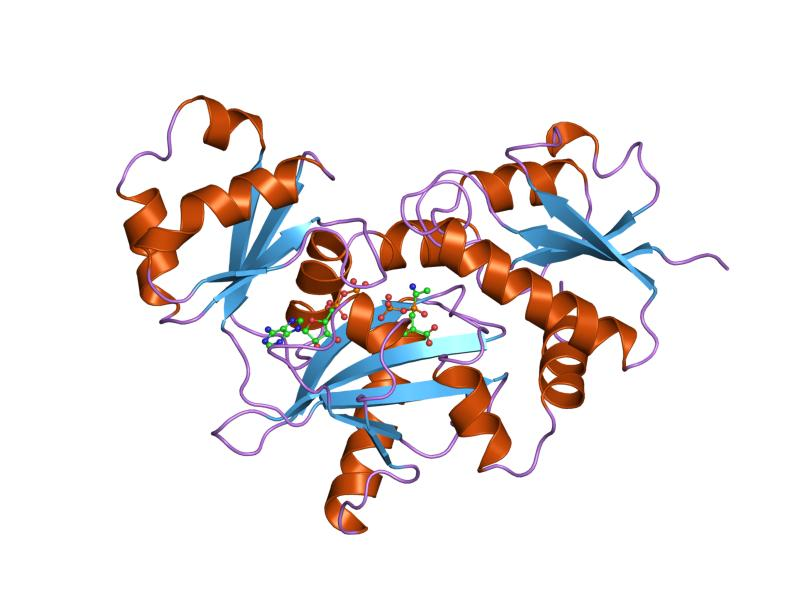
- complex of y216f d-ala:d-ala ligase with adp and a phosphoryl phosphinate

Identifiers
- Symbol: Dala_Dala_lig_C
- Pfam: PF07478
- Pfam clan: CL0179
- InterPro: IPR011095
- SCOP2: 2dln / SCOPe / SUPFAM
Available protein structures:
- Pfam: structures / ECOD
- PDB: RCSB PDB; PDBe; PDBj
- PDBsum: structure summary

In enzymology, a D-alanine—D-alanine ligase (EC 6.3.2.4) is an enzyme that catalyzes the chemical reaction

ATP + 2 D-alanine $\rightleftharpoons$ ADP + phosphate + D-alanyl-D-alanine

Thus, the two substrates of this enzyme are ATP and D-alanine, whereas its 3 products are ADP, phosphate, and D-alanyl-D-alanine.

This enzyme belongs to the family of ATP-grasp ligases, specifically those forming carbon-nitrogen bonds as acid-D-amino-acid ligases (peptide synthases). The systematic name of this enzyme class is D-alanine:D-alanine ligase (ADP-forming). Other names in common use include alanine:alanine ligase (ADP-forming), and alanylalanine synthetase. This enzyme participates in d-alanine metabolism and peptidoglycan biosynthesis. Phosphinate and D-cycloserine are known to inhibit this enzyme.

The N-terminal region of the D-alanine—D-alanine ligase is thought to be involved in substrate binding, while the C-terminus is thought to be a catalytic domain.

== Structural studies ==
As of late 2007, 8 structures have been solved for this class of enzymes, with PDB accession codes 1IOV, 1IOW, 2DLN, 2FB9, 2I80, 2I87, and 2I8C.
