= Ornithine transcarbamylase =

Mammalian protein found in Homo sapiens

OTC
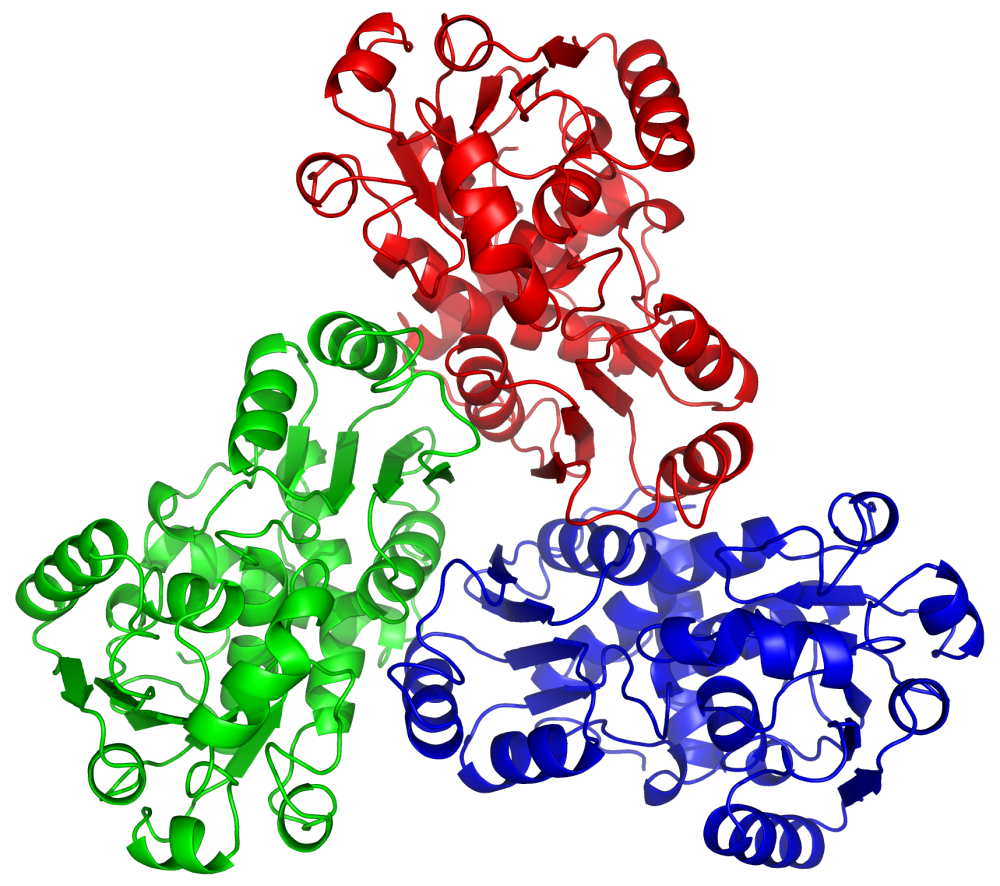

Identifiers
- Aliases: OTC, OCTD, ornithine carbamoyltransferase, ornithine transcarbamylase, OTCD
- External IDs: OMIM: 300461; MGI: 97448; GeneCards: OTC
Available structures
PDB	Ortholog search: PDBe RCSB
PDB	List of PDB id codes 1OTH, 1C9Y, 1EP9, 1FVO
Enzyme activity
EC #	BRENDA	ExPASy	KEGG	MetaCyc
2.1.3.3	↗	↗	↗	↗

Gene location (Human)
Chr.	X chromosome (human)
Band	Xp11.4	Start	38,352,586 bp
Band	Xp11.4	End	38,421,446 bp

Gene location (Mouse)
Chr.	X chromosome (mouse)
Band	X A1.1|X 4.66 cM	Start	10,118,544 bp
Band	X A1.1|X 4.66 cM	End	10,187,263 bp
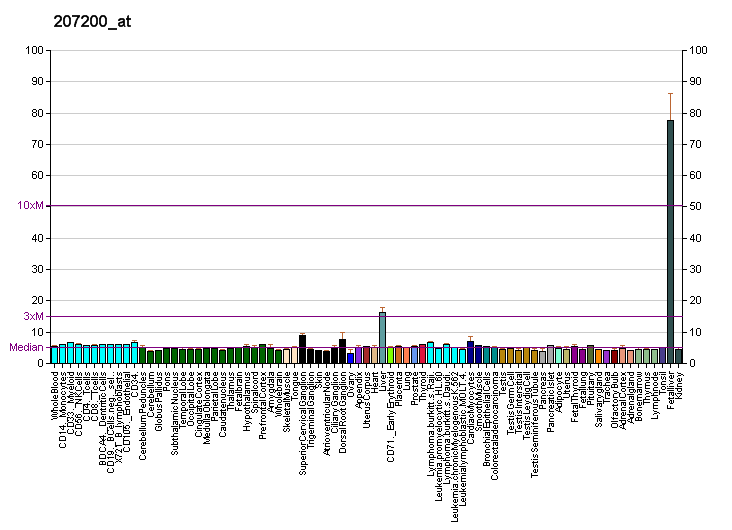
RNA expression pattern
Bgee	Human / Mouse (ortholog); Top expressed in: jejunal mucosa; right lobe of liver; duodenum; mucosa of transverse colon; mucosa of ileum; testicle; rectum; gonad; right coronary artery; pancreatic ductal cell / Top expressed in: left lobe of liver; Ileal epithelium; gallbladder; jejunum; migratory enteric neural crest cell; Paneth cell; duodenum; crypt of lieberkuhn of small intestine; human fetus; fetal liver hematopoietic progenitor cell; More reference expression data
BioGPS	More reference expression data
Gene ontology
Molecular function	amino acid binding; transferase activity; carboxyl- or carbamoyltransferase activity; phosphate ion binding; phospholipid binding; ornithine carbamoyltransferase activity
Cellular component	cytoplasm; mitochondrial inner membrane; mitochondrial matrix; mitochondrion
Biological process	response to zinc ion; cellular amino acid biosynthetic process; ornithine catabolic process; midgut development; cellular amino acid metabolic process; response to nutrient levels; response to biotin; anion homeostasis; liver development; arginine biosynthetic process; response to insulin; ammonium homeostasis; ornithine metabolic process; protein homotrimerization; urea cycle; citrulline biosynthetic process; arginine biosynthetic process via ornithine
Sources:Amigo / QuickGO
Orthologs
Databases	NCBI: entry; OMA: entry
Species	Human	Mouse
Entrez	5009	18416
Ensembl	ENSG00000036473	ENSMUSG00000031173
UniProt	P00480	P11725
RefSeq (mRNA)	NM_000531	NM_008769
RefSeq (protein)	NP_000522	NP_032795
Location (UCSC)	Chr X: 38.35 – 38.42 Mb	Chr X: 10.12 – 10.19 Mb
PubMed search
- Wikidata
View/Edit Human	View/Edit Mouse

Ornithine transcarbamylase (OTC) (also called ornithine carbamoyltransferase) is an enzyme (EC 2.1.3.3) that catalyzes the reaction between carbamoyl phosphate and ornithine to form citrulline and phosphate (P_{i}). There are two classes of OTC: anabolic and catabolic. This article focuses on anabolic OTC.

In mammals, OTC plays an essential role in the urea cycle, the purpose of which is to capture toxic ammonia and transform it into urea, a less toxic nitrogen source, for excretion. In prokaryotes, anabolic OTC facilitates the sixth step in the biosynthesis of the amino acid arginine.

== Reaction mechanism ==
The side-chain amino group of ornithine (Orn) attacks the carbonyl carbon of carbamoylphosphate (CP), forming a tetrahedral intermediate. Collapse of the transitions state releases citrulline (Cit) and inorganic phosphate (P_{i}).

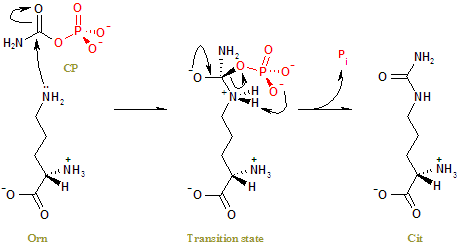

== Structure ==
OTC is a trimeric protein. There are three active sites of the protein which are located at the cleft between the monomers. The carbamoyl phosphate binding domain resides on the N-terminal end of each monomer, while the C-terminal end contains the binding domain for ornithine. Both binding domains have a similar structural pattern with a central parallel β-pleated sheet bordered by α-helices and loops. In addition to the binding domains, OTCs have SMG loops. These swing to close the binding site once both substrates have bound. SMG stands for the conserved amino acid motif of Ser-Met-Gly. Upon closure, these residues interact with L-ornithine. The binding of CP induces a global conformational change, while the binding of L-ornithine only induces movement of the SMG loop to close and isolate the activation site.

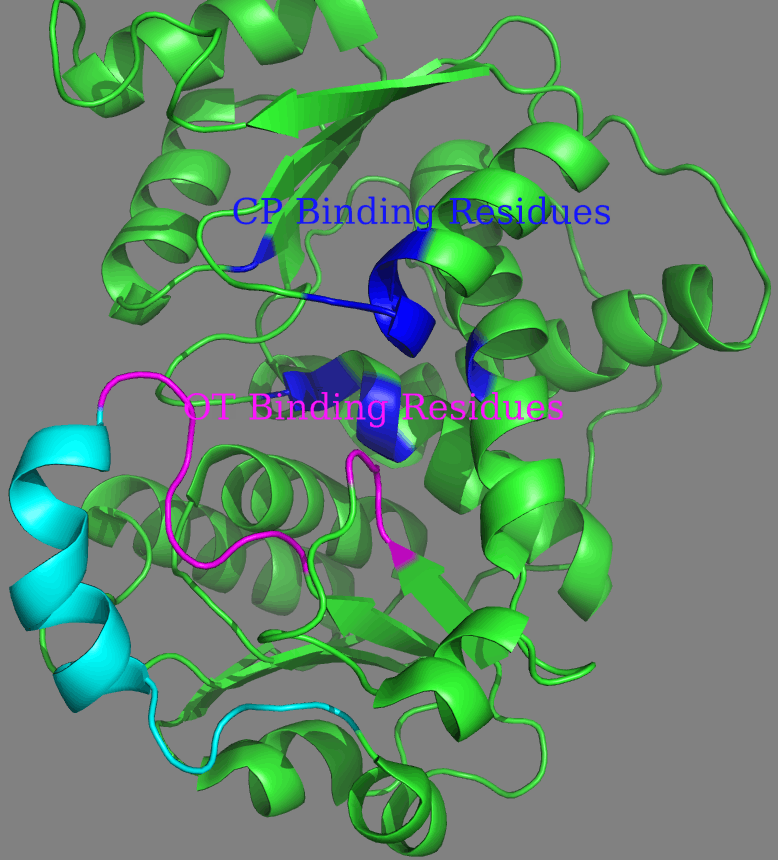
Binding residues in a Human monomer of OTC. Ornithine's (OT) residues are in magenta, carbamoyl phosphate (CP) binding residues are in dark blue, and other residues a part of the SMG loop are in aqua.

=== Active site ===
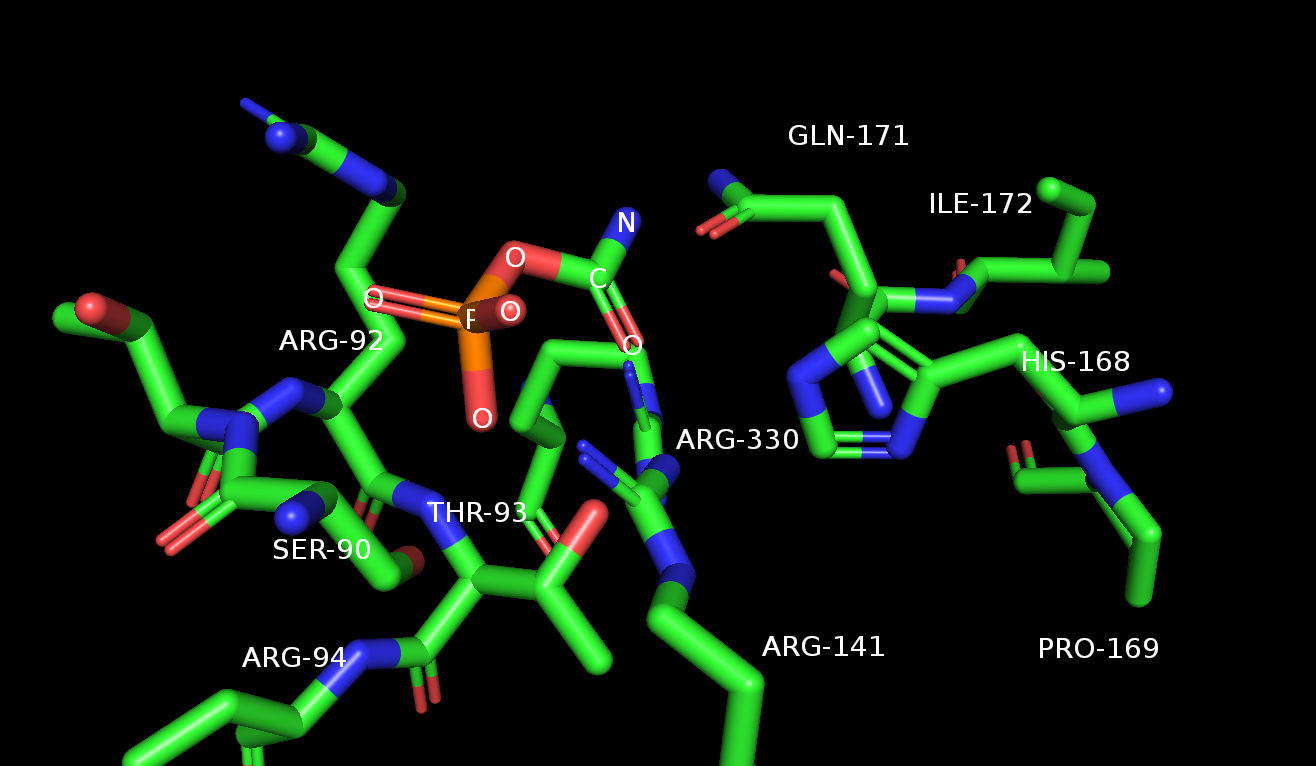
Depicted is CP situated in OTC's Binding Site with residues that play an important role in binding CP.

Ser-Thr-Arg-Thr-Arg motif from one subunit and a His from the neighboring subunit both interact with the phosphate group of CP for binding. Binding the primary nitrogen of CP are residues Gln, Cys, and Arg. The carbonyl oxygen of CP is bound by residues Thr, Arg, and His.

=== Amino acid composition ===
Plant OTCs have the largest difference from other OTCs. There are 50 to 70% less Leu residues, while there are twice as many Arg residues. The number of subunits in OTCs vary from 322 to 340 residues. Animals have the highest density of Leu. This residue breakdown causes a pI for the animal enzyme of 6.8 while the plant enzyme has a pI of 7.6. Rat, bovine, and human OTC have the same C terminal residue of phenylalanine. Their N-terminal residues on the other hand differ. Rat ends with Ser, bovine with aspartate, and human with glycine.

== Genomics ==
The human OTC gene is located on the short arm of chromosome X (Xp21.1). The gene is located in the Watson (plus) strand and is 73 kbases in length. The open reading frame of 1,062 nucleotides is disbursed between 10 exons and nine introns. The encoded protein is 354 amino acids long with a predicted molecular weight of 39.935 kD. Postranscriptional modification leaves the mature peptide with 322 amino acids and a weight of 36.1 kD. The protein is located in the mitochondrial matrix. In mammals, OTC is expressed in the liver and small intestinal mucosa.

=== Human mutations ===
341 mutations in human OTC have been reported. At least 259 of these mutations are considered to be disease-causing mutations. 149 of these mutations are known to cause onset of hyperammonemia during the first weeks of life. 70 manifest as hyperammonemia in male patients later in life. Most of the mutations occur in known functional motifs, such as the SMG loop or CP binding domains.

== Deficiency ==
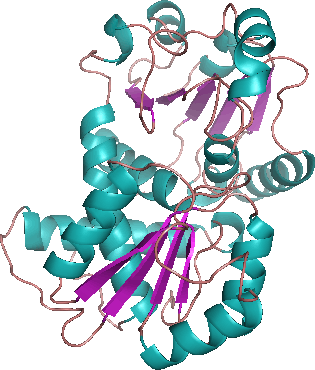
OTC monomer

Mutations in the OTC gene can cause Ornithine transcarbamylase deficiency. It is classified as a urea cycle disorder due to the fact that without proper OTC function ammonia starts to accumulate in the blood. Accumulation of ammonia in the blood is known as hyperammonemia. Although toxic in excess, ammonia is a nitrogen source for the body. Therefore increased ammonia will also increase levels of the nitrogen-containing non-essential amino acids glutamate, glutamine, and alanine. Levels of carbamoyl phosphate (CP) will begin to drop as urea nitrogen levels in the blood decrease. This will cause CP to be diverted to the uridine monophosphate synthetic pathway. Orotic acid is a product of this pathway. Increased levels of orotic acid in urine can be an indicator that a patient is suffering from a disorder linked to hyperammonemia.

OTC deficiency manifests in both early and late onset forms.

=== Early onset ===
Early onset is seen in newborns. The symptoms of a urea cycle disorder are often not seen until the child is at home and may not be recognized in a timely manner by the family and primary care physician. Symptoms in young children with hyperammonemia are non-specific: not willing to eat, problems with breathing, body temperature, seizures, unusual body movements (twitches) and somnolence. As ammonia build up continues, symptoms progress from somnolence to lethargy potentially ending in a coma. Abnormal posturing (uncontrolled movement) and encephalopathy (brain damage) are often related to the degree of central nervous system swelling and pressure upon the brainstem. About 50% of neonates with severe hyperammonemia have seizures.

=== Late onset ===
In milder (or partial) urea cycle enzyme deficiencies, ammonia accumulation may be triggered by illness or stress at almost any time of life, resulting in multiple mild elevations of plasma ammonia concentration [Bourrier et al. 1988]. Patients with partial enzyme deficiencies may have a delay of symptoms for months or years. Indicators that you maybe suffering from OTC deficiency or a urea cycle disorder include "episodes of delirium, erratic behavior, or reduced consciousness, headaches, vomiting, aversion to foods high in protein, and seizures."

=== Treatment ===
A potential treatment for the high ammonia levels is to give sodium benzoate, which combines with glycine to produce hippurate, at the same time removing an ammonium group. Biotin (vitamin B7) also plays an important role in the functioning of the OTC enzyme and has been shown to reduce ammonia intoxication in animal experiments. Additionally, the use of whole-body therapeutic hypothermia (TH) has been proposed and studied as a treatment. TH is thought to increase the effectiveness of dialysis to extract ammonia from the body.
