= Jesse Gelsinger =

American man who died during a clinical trial (1981–1999)

Jesse Gelsinger

Jesse Gelsinger (June 18, 1981 – September 17, 1999) was the first person publicly identified as having died in a clinical trial for gene therapy. Gelsinger suffered from ornithine transcarbamylase deficiency, an X-linked genetic disease of the liver, the symptoms of which include an inability to metabolize ammonia – a byproduct of protein breakdown. The disease is usually fatal at birth, but Gelsinger had a milder form of the disease, in which the ornithine transcarbamylase gene is mutated in only part of the patient's cells, a condition known as somatic mosaicism. As his deficiency was partial, Gelsinger managed to survive on a restricted diet and special medications.

Gelsinger joined a clinical trial run by the University of Pennsylvania that aimed at developing a treatment for infants born with the severe form of the disease. On September 13, 1999, Gelsinger was injected with an adenoviral vector carrying a corrected gene to test the safety of the procedure. He died four days later at the age of 18, on September 17, apparently having suffered a massive immune response triggered by the use of the viral vector to transport the gene into his cells, leading to multiple organ failure and brain death.

A Food and Drug Administration (FDA) investigation concluded that the scientists involved in the trial, including the co-investigator James Wilson (Director of the Institute for Human Gene Therapy), broke several rules of conduct:

- Inclusion of Gelsinger as a substitute for another volunteer who dropped out, despite Gelsinger's having high ammonia levels that should have led to his exclusion from the trial.
- Failure by the university to report that two patients had experienced serious side effects from the gene therapy.
- Failure to disclose, in the informed-consent documentation, the deaths of monkeys given a similar treatment.

The University of Pennsylvania later issued a rebuttal, but the university and Children's National Medical Center each agreed to pay more than $500,000 to the government. Both Wilson and the University are reported to have had financial stakes in the research. After his death, all gene therapy trials in the United States halted for a time. The Gelsinger case was a severe setback for scientists working in the field and a reminder of the risks involved.
