= Carboxyphosphate =

Identifiers
CAS Number	acid: 7244-85-1
3D model (JSmol)	acid: Interactive image
ChEBI	acid: CHEBI:90099
ChemSpider	acid: 169777; dianion: 169776
KEGG	C20969
PubChem CID	acid: 195870
CompTox Dashboard (EPA)	DTXSID401226114
- InChI: acid: InChI=1S/CH3O6P/c2-1(3)7-8(4,5)6/h(H,2,3)(H2,4,5,6) Key: LQQCGEGRINLHDP-UHFFFAOYSA-N
- SMILES: acid: C(=O)(O)OP(=O)(O)O
- Except where otherwise noted, data are given for materials in their standard state (at 25 °C [77 °F], 100 kPa). Infobox references

Carboxyphosphate (or carboxyphosphoric acid) is a highly unstable mixed anhydride and a metabolic intermediate in nature. It serves as a transient, enzyme bound substance used to transport and transfer carbon dioxide in various biological pathways.

== See also ==
- Carbamoyl phosphate
