= Dark adaptation threshold =

Dark Adaptation Threshold (DAT) is a vision test that measures the adjustment of the eye occurring under low levels of illumination.

When light enters the eye, it ultimately reaches the rods and cones, which are two types of cells in the retina. Rods handle vision in low light conditions and cones handle color vision and detail. The rods and cones each react differently during the DAT test, and are measured on a graph. The test determines the threshold, or minimum light intensity required to produce a visual sensation in the child's eye.

In order to perform this test, the child is asked to sit in the dark for a half-hour. This allows the eyes to be most sensitive for the test. Once the eyes have fully adapted, the child stands in front of a black projection screen. Dim spots of light are projected onto the screen, one at a time, on either the right or the left side. The spots get dimmer as the test goes on. Children are asked to point to the spots until the spots are no longer distinguishable. In order to keep the child's attention on the screen, sometimes the doctor will wave a brighter light on the screen to hold the child's interest when the test becomes harder to see. When an infant is being tested, an observer with a night vision camera records the head and eye movements of the child as they look at the spots. Once the child can no longer see the spots, the dark adapted threshold is determined. The DAT test lasts for about 10 to 15 minutes.

The DAT test may be ordered as part of an investigation into a suspected Vitamin A deficiency.

Dark adaptation gets weaker as people age, partially because the pupil of the eye cannot open as widely in older people.

== See also ==
- Color vision test
