= Carbamoyl phosphate synthetase I =

Enzyme

CPS1

Identifiers
- Aliases: CPS1, PHN, carbamoyl-phosphate synthase 1, CPSASE1, GATD6
- External IDs: OMIM: 608307; MGI: 891996; GeneCards: CPS1
Available structures
PDB	Ortholog search: A0A3T0V883 PDBe A0A3T0V883 RCSB
PDB	List of PDB id codes 2YVQ, 5DOU, 5DOT, 4UUA, 4UTV, 4UTR, 4UUB, 4UU8, 4UTZ, 4UU7
Enzyme activity
EC #	BRENDA	ExPASy	KEGG	MetaCyc
6.3.4.16	↗	↗	↗	↗

Gene location (Human)
Chr.	Chromosome 2 (human)
Band	2q34	Start	210,477,682 bp
Band	2q34	End	210,679,107 bp

Gene location (Mouse)
Chr.	Chromosome 1 (mouse)
Band	1 C3|1 33.75 cM	Start	67,162,185 bp
Band	1 C3|1 33.75 cM	End	67,270,418 bp
RNA expression pattern
Bgee	Human / Mouse (ortholog); Top expressed in: liver; right lobe of liver; jejunal mucosa; duodenum; buccal mucosa cell; mucosa of ileum; secondary oocyte; internal globus pallidus; gonad; male germ cell / Top expressed in: left lobe of liver; epithelium of small intestine; migratory enteric neural crest cell; Ileal epithelium; Paneth cell; gallbladder; crypt of lieberkuhn of small intestine; jejunum; duodenum; sexually immature organism; More reference expression data
BioGPS	n/a
Gene ontology
Molecular function	nucleotide binding; calcium ion binding; endopeptidase activity; metal ion binding; ligase activity; modified amino acid binding; catalytic activity; protein binding; phospholipid binding; ATP binding; glutamate binding; carbamoyl-phosphate synthase (ammonia) activity; carbamoyl-phosphate synthase (glutamine-hydrolyzing) activity; protein-containing complex binding; aspartate carbamoyltransferase activity; dihydroorotase activity
Cellular component	cytoplasm; mitochondrial matrix; mitochondrion; mitochondrial inner membrane; mitochondrial nucleoid; nucleus; nucleolus; protein-containing complex
Biological process	response to amino acid; response to glucagon; anion homeostasis; response to steroid hormone; cellular response to glucagon stimulus; hepatocyte differentiation; response to zinc ion; nitrogen compound metabolic process; response to glucocorticoid; cellular response to fibroblast growth factor stimulus; proteolysis; response to dexamethasone; triglyceride catabolic process; nitric oxide metabolic process; response to lipopolysaccharide; glutamine metabolic process; carbamoyl phosphate biosynthetic process; response to amine; response to growth hormone; response to food; response to starvation; liver development; metabolism; response to cAMP; homocysteine metabolic process; response to toxic substance; citrulline biosynthetic process; response to oleic acid; cellular response to cAMP; cellular response to oleic acid; midgut development; 'de novo' pyrimidine nucleobase biosynthetic process; vasodilation; urea cycle; arginine biosynthetic process
Sources:Amigo / QuickGO
Orthologs
Databases	NCBI: entry; OMA: entry
Species	Human	Mouse
Entrez	1373	227231
Ensembl	ENSG00000021826	ENSMUSG00000025991
UniProt	P31327	Q8C196
RefSeq (mRNA)	NM_001122633; NM_001122634; NM_001875; NM_001369256; NM_001369257	NM_001080809
RefSeq (protein)	NP_001116105; NP_001866; NP_001356185; NP_001356186	NP_001074278
Location (UCSC)	Chr 2: 210.48 – 210.68 Mb	Chr 1: 67.16 – 67.27 Mb
PubMed search
- Wikidata
View/Edit Human	View/Edit Mouse

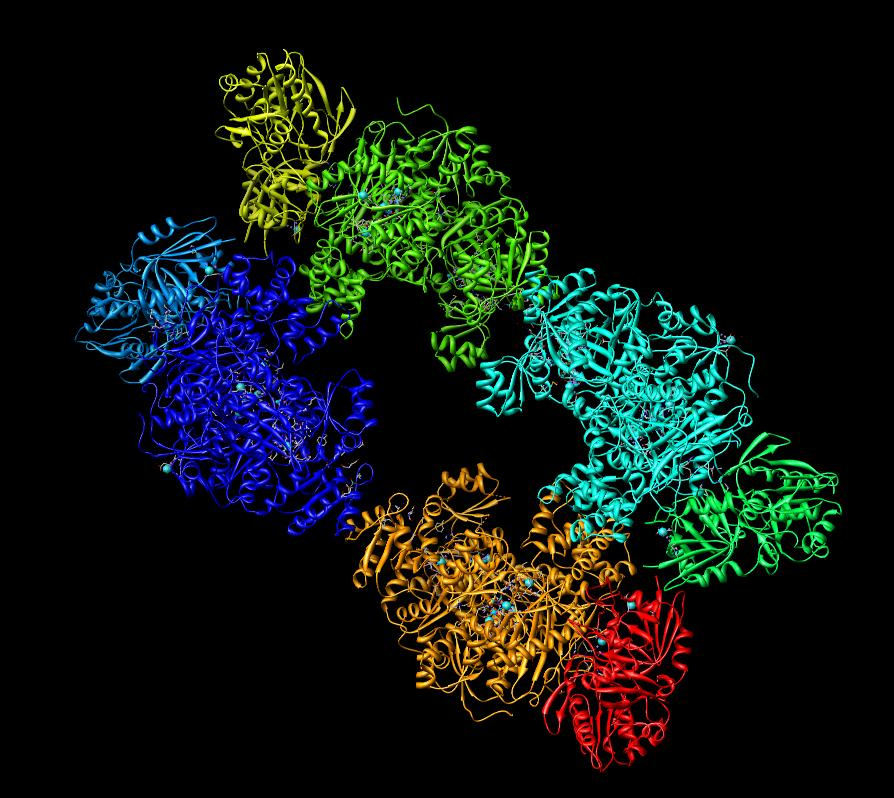
Carbamoyl phosphate synthetase

Carbamoyl phosphate synthetase I (CPS1 or CPSI) is a ligase enzyme located in the mitochondria involved in protein metabolism and the subsequent production of urea in animals. It transfers an ammonia molecule to a molecule of bicarbonate that has been phosphorylated by a molecule of ATP. The resulting carbamate is then phosphorylated with another molecule of ATP. The resulting molecule of carbamoyl phosphate leaves the enzyme. Abnormal or loss of the enzyme leads to CPS1 deficiency, a severe and deadly metabolic disorder.

== Structure ==
In E. coli the single CPS that carries out the functions of CPSI and CPSII is a heterodimer with a small subunit and a larger subunit with about 382 and 1073 amino acid residues in size, although in mammals (and other vertebrates) the CPSI protein is encoded by a single gene. The small subunit contains one active site for the binding and deamination of glutamine to make ammonia and glutamate. The large subunit contains two active sites, one for the production of carboxyphosphate, and the other for the production of carbamoyl phosphate. Within the large subunit there are two domains (B and C) each with an active site of the ATP-grasp family. Connecting the two subunits is a tunnel of sorts, which directs the ammonia from the small subunit to the large subunit.

== Mechanism ==
The overall reaction that occurs in CPSI is:

2ATP + HCO_{3}^{−} + NH_{4}^{+} → 2ADP + Carbamoyl phosphate + P_{i}

This reaction can be thought of occurring in three distinct steps.

1. Bicarbonate is phosphorylated to form carboxyphosphate
2. Ammonia attacks the carboxyphosphate, resulting in carbamate
3. Carbamate is phosphorylated to give carbamoyl phosphate

=== Regulation ===
CPSI is regulated by N-acetylglutamate which acts as an obligate allosteric activator of CPS1. NAG, by binding to domain L4, triggers changes in the A-loop and in Arg1453 that result in changing interactions with the T′-loop of domain L3, which reorganizes completely from a β-hairpin in the apo form to a widened loop in the ligand-bound form. In this last form, the T′-loop interacts also with the tunnel-loop and the T-loop of the L1 domain, thus transferring the activating information to the bicarbonate-phosphorylating domain. This interaction with NAG and a second interaction, with a nucleotide, stabilise the active form of CPSI. The necessity for this ligand also connects the high concentration of nitrogen, reflected in excess of glutamate and arginine to produce NAG, to an increase in CPSI activity to clear this excess.

== Metabolism ==
CPSI plays a vital role in protein and nitrogen metabolism. Once ammonia has been brought into the mitochondria via glutamine or glutamate, it is CPSI's job to add the ammonia to bicarbonate along with a phosphate group to form carbamoyl phosphate. Carbamoyl phosphate is then put into the urea cycle to eventually create urea. Urea can then be transferred back to the blood stream and to the kidneys for filtration and on to the bladder for excretion.

=== Disease ===
Lack of or non-functional CPS1 due to mutation in the CPS1 gene on chromosome 2 that leads to carbamoyl phosphate synthetase I deficiency. CPS1 deficiency is an autosomal recessive metabolic disorder inherited from the mutation-carrier parents. When CPS1 functionality is absent, proteins and nitrogen are poorly, rather incompletely metabolised, resulting in high levels of ammonia in the body. This is dangerous because ammonia is highly toxic to the body, especially the nervous system, and can result in intellectual disability and seizures. The disease is rare and is estimated to occur one in 1.3 million people worldwide, but the condition is poorly recorded since most individuals with the disease die during infancy.
