= ATP-grasp =

Protein structural motif

ATP-grasp domain
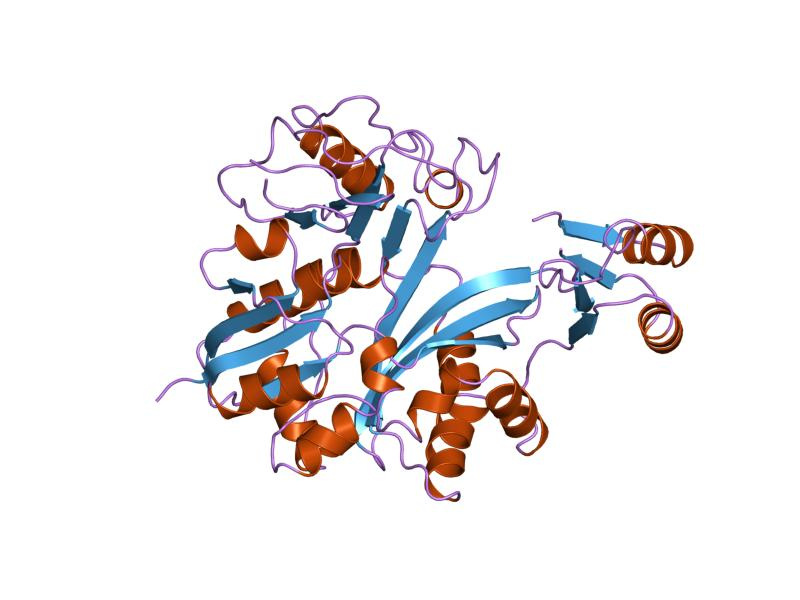
- Ribbon diagram of glycinamide ribonucleotide synthetase (1gso) demonstrating the ATP grasp superfamily fold.

Identifiers
- Symbol: ATP-grasp
- Pfam: PF02222
- Pfam clan: CL0179
- ECOD: 206.1.3
- InterPro: IPR013815
Available protein structures:
- PDB: IPR013815 PF02222 (ECOD; PDBsum)
- AlphaFold: IPR013815; PF02222

In molecular biology, the ATP-grasp fold is a unique ATP-binding protein structural motif made of two α+β subdomains that "grasp" a molecule of ATP between them. ATP-grasp proteins have ATP-dependent carboxylate-amine/thiol ligase activity.

== Structure ==
Proteins of the ATP-grasp family have an overall structural configuration organised into three domains referred to as the N-terminal domain (or A-domain), the central domain (or B-domain), and the C-terminal domain (or C-domain).

== Function ==
ATP-grasp enzymes catalyse the ATP-dependent ligation of a carboxylate-containing molecule to an amino or thiol group-containing molecule. The reactions typically involve formation of acylphosphate intermediates. These enzymes are involved in various metabolic pathways including purine biosynthesis, fatty acid synthesis, and gluconeogenesis.

== Examples of proteins containing this domain ==
- D-alanine-D-alanine ligase
- glutathione synthetase
- biotin carboxylase
- carbamoyl phosphate synthetase
- ribosomal protein S6 modification enzyme (RimK)
- urea amidolyase
- tubulin-tyrosine ligase
- enzymes involved in purine biosynthesis
- ATP-grasp ligases involved in Graspetide natural product biosynthesis

== Evolution and distribution ==
The ATP-grasp fold is evolutionarily conserved across different enzyme families and its presence is ubiquitous across prokaryotes and eukaryotes.

== Use in research ==
Researchers have developed several types of inhibitors for these enzymes, including mechanism-based inhibitors, ATP-competitive inhibitors, and non-competitive inhibitors. Some ATP-grasp enzymes are being studied as potential targets for antibiotics and anti-obesity drugs.
