= N-acetylornithine carbamoyltransferase =

Enzyme

Identifiers
- EC no.: 2.1.3.9
- CAS no.: 890853-54-0

Databases
- IntEnz: IntEnz view
- BRENDA: BRENDA entry
- ExPASy: NiceZyme view
- KEGG: KEGG entry
- MetaCyc: metabolic pathway
- PRIAM: profile
- PDB structures: RCSB PDB PDBe PDBsum
- Gene Ontology: AmiGO / QuickGO
Search
- PMC: articles
- PubMed: articles
- NCBI: proteins

In enzymology, a N-acetylornithine carbamoyltransferase (EC 2.1.3.9) is an enzyme that catalyzes the chemical reaction:

carbamoyl phosphate
+
N(2)-acetyl-L-ornithine
H_{2}PO^{−}_{4}
H_{2}PO^{−}_{4}
N-acetyl-L-citrulline

The enzyme converts N(2)-acetyl-L-ornithine to N-acetyl-L-citrulline by transferring a carbamoyl group from carbamoyl phosphate.

This enzyme belongs to the family of transferases that transfer one-carbon groups, specifically the carboxy- and carbamoyltransferases. The systematic name of this enzyme class is carbamoyl-phosphate:N2-acetyl-L-ornithine carbamoyltransferase. Other names in common use include acetylornithine transcarbamylase, N-acetylornithine transcarbamylase, AOTC, and carbamoyl-phosphate:2-N-acetyl-L-ornithine carbamoyltransferase.

== Structural studies ==
As of late 2007, 4 structures have been solved for this class of enzymes, with PDB accession codes 2G65, 2G68, 2G6A, and 2G6C.
