= Carbamoyl phosphate synthase II =

Enzyme

Carbamoyl-phosphate synthetase (glutamine-hydrolysing)

Identifiers
- EC no.: 6.3.5.5
- CAS no.: 37233-48-0

Databases
- BRENDA: enzyme data
- ExPASy: NiceZyme view
- KEGG: enzyme entry
- MetaCyc: metabolic pathway
- Rhea: reactions
- PDB structures: RCSB PDB PDBe PDBsum
Search
- PMC: articles
- PubMed: articles
- NCBI: proteins

carbamoyl-phosphate synthetase 1, aspartate transcarbamylase, and dihydroorotase

Identifiers
- Symbol: CAD
- NCBI gene: 790
- HGNC: 1424
- OMIM: 114010
- RefSeq: NM_004341
- UniProt: P27708

Other data
- Locus: Chr. 2 p21
Search for
- Structures: Swiss-model
- Domains: InterPro

Carbamoyl phosphate synthetase (glutamine-hydrolysing) (EC 6.3.5.5) is an enzyme that catalyzes the reactions that produce carbamoyl phosphate in the cytosol (as opposed to type I, which functions in the mitochondria). Its systemic name is hydrogen-carbonate:l-glutamine amido-ligase (ADP-forming, carbamate-phosphorylating).

In pyrimidine biosynthesis, it serves as the rate-limiting enzyme and catalyzes the following reaction:

2 ATP + l-glutamine + HCO_{3}^{–} + H_{2}O ⇌ 2 ADP + phosphate + l-glutamate + carbamoyl phosphate (overall reaction)
(1a) l-glutamine + H_{2}O ⇌ l-glutamate + NH_{3}
(1b) 2 ATP + HCO_{3}^{–} + NH_{3} ⇌ 2 ADP + phosphate + carbamoyl phosphate

It is activated by ATP and PRPP and it is inhibited by UTP (Uridine triphosphate) Neither CPSI nor CPSII require biotin as a coenzyme, as seen with most carboxylation reactions.

It is one of the four functional enzymatic domains coded by the CAD gene. The CAD gene is a large gene. It uses a single strand to code for these enzyme jobs. It is classified under EC 6.3.5.5.

== See also ==
- Carbamoyl phosphate synthetase I
- Carbamoyl phosphate synthetase III
