= Ornithine =

L-Ornithine

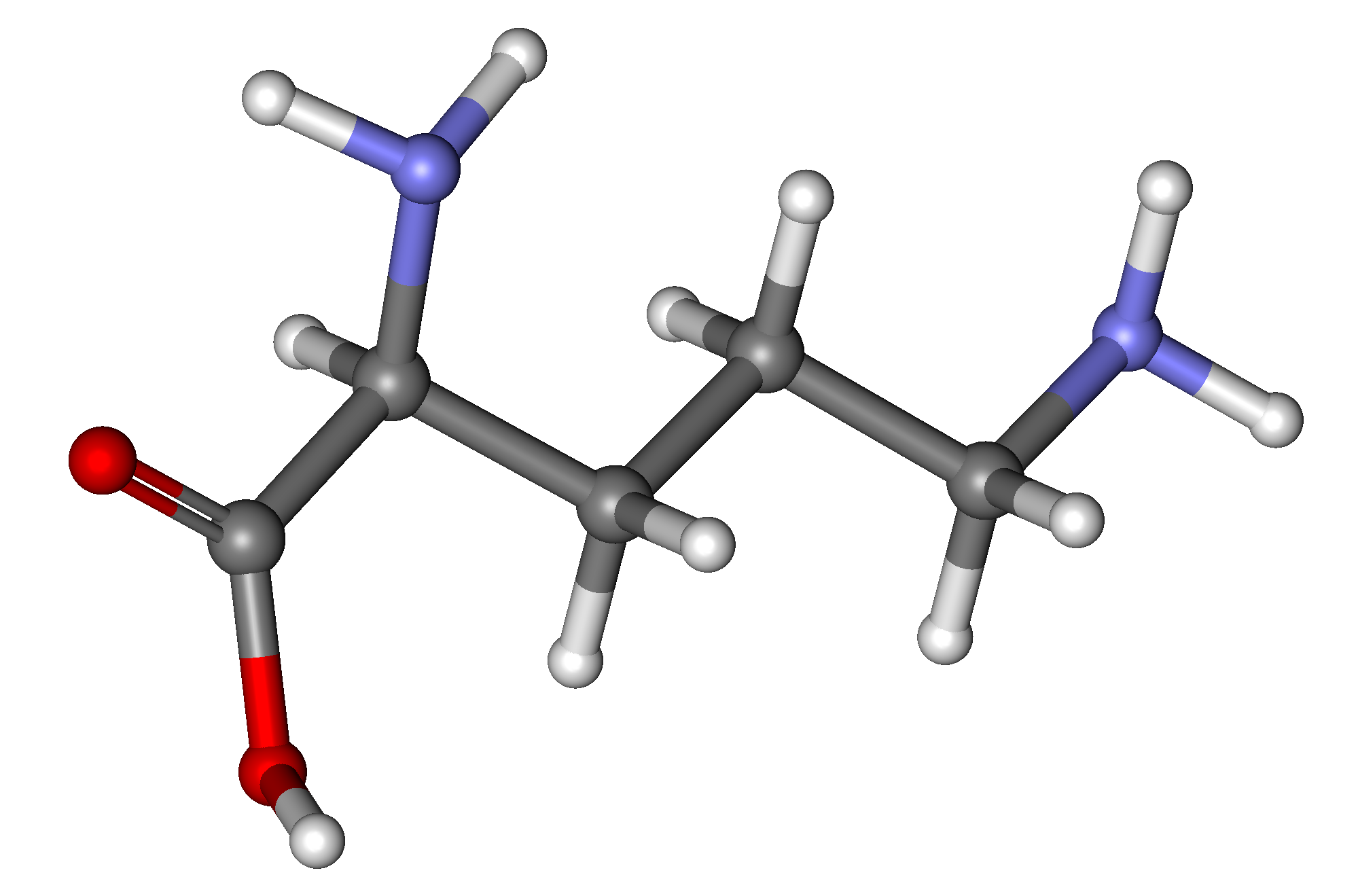

Names
- IUPAC name (2S)-2,5-diaminopentanoic acid
- Other names (+)-(S)-2,5-Diaminovaleric acid (+)-(S)-2,5-Diaminopentanoic acid

Identifiers
CAS Number	70-26-8
3D model (JSmol)	Interactive image
ChEBI	CHEBI:15729
ChEMBL	ChEMBL446143
ChemSpider	6026
DrugBank	DB00129
ECHA InfoCard	100.000.665
EC Number	200-731-7
IUPHAR/BPS	725
KEGG	D08302
MeSH	Ornithine
PubChem CID	389
UNII	E524N2IXA3
CompTox Dashboard (EPA)	DTXSID00883219
- InChI: InChI=1S/C5H12N2O2/c6-3-1-2-4(7)5(8)9/h4H,1-3,6-7H2,(H,8,9)/t4-/m0/s1 Key: AHLPHDHHMVZTML-BYPYZUCNSA-N; InChI=1/C5H12N2O2/c6-3-1-2-4(7)5(8)9/h4H,1-3,6-7H2,(H,8,9)/t4-/m0/s1 Key: AHLPHDHHMVZTML-BYPYZUCNSA-N
- SMILES: O=C(O)[C@@H](N)CCCN

Properties
Chemical formula	C_{5}H_{12}N_{2}O_{2}
Molar mass	132.16 g/mol
Melting point	140 °C (284 °F; 413 K)
Solubility in water	Soluble
Solubility	Soluble in ethanol
Acidity (pK_{a})	1.94
Chiral rotation ([α]_{D})	+11.5 (H_{2}O, c = 6.5)
- Except where otherwise noted, data are given for materials in their standard state (at 25 °C [77 °F], 100 kPa). verify (what is ?) Infobox references

Ornithine is a non-proteinogenic α-amino acid that plays an essential role in the urea cycle (to the extent that it is sometimes also called the ornithine cycle). Improper levels can cause disorders of the urea cycle, such as hyperornithinemia, hyperammonemia as well as other metabolic diseases such as gyrate atrophy and cancer.

The name "ornithine" originates from the Greek word for bird (ornis or ornith-) in reference to its discovery as a benzoate ester in chicken excrement, by Max Jaffe in 1877. It is a key substrate for the biosynthesis of proline, polyamines and citrulline, and is non-essential (not required in diet). The moiety derived from ornithine is called ornithyl.

== Role in urea cycle ==
L-Ornithine is one of the products of the action of the enzyme arginase on L-arginine, creating urea. Therefore, ornithine is a central component of the urea cycle, which enables the disposal of excess nitrogen. Ornithine itself is recycled and, in a sense, acts as a catalyst.

First, ammonia is converted into carbamoyl phosphate (H_{2}NC(O)OPO^{2−}_{3}) by carbamoyl phosphate synthetase. Ornithine transcarbamylase then catalyzes the reaction between carbamoyl phosphate and ornithine to form citrulline and phosphate (P_{i}). Another amino group is contributed by aspartate, leading to the formation of arginine and the byproduct fumarate. The resulting arginine, a guanidinium compound, is subsequently hydrolyzed by arginase to regenerate ornithine and release urea.

The two nitrogen atoms in urea are derived from ammonia and aspartate, while the nitrogen atoms in ornithine remain unchanged.

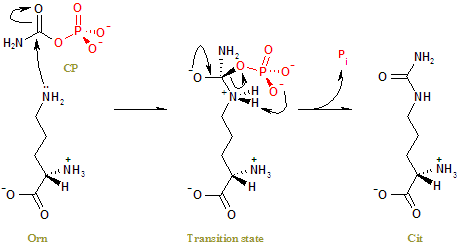
Reaction mechanism:. The side-chain amino group of ornithine (Orn) nucleophilically attacks the carbonyl carbon of carbamoyl phosphate (CP), left, forming a tetrahedral transition state, middle. Charge rearrangement then releases citrulline (Cit) and phosphate (P_{i}), right.

Ornithine is not an amino acid directly coded for by DNA; that is, it is not a proteinogenic amino acid. However, in mammalian non-hepatic tissues, the primary role of the urea cycle is often the biosynthesis of arginine. As an intermediate in metabolic pathways, ornithine is thus quite important.

== Other reactions ==
Ornithine, through the action of ornithine decarboxylase (EC 4.1.1.17), serves as the starting point for the synthesis of polyamines such as putrescine.

In bacteria such as E. coli, ornithine can be synthesized from L-glutamate.

Ornithine lactamization

== Research ==
=== Exercise fatigue ===
L-Ornithine supplementation has been shown to attenuate fatigue in subjects in placebo-controlled studies using a cycle ergometer. The results suggest that L-ornithine may exert an antifatigue effect by increasing the efficiency of energy consumption and promoting the excretion of ammonia.

=== Weightlifting supplement ===
Amino acid supplements, including L-ornithine, are frequently marketed to bodybuilders and weightlifters with claims of increasing levels of human growth hormone (HGH), muscle mass, and strength. A short, four-day clinical study conducted in 1993 reported that L-ornithine, in combination with L-arginine and L-lysine at 2 g/day each, did not increase HGH levels. A review published in 2002 concluded, "The use of specific amino acids to stimulate GH release by athletes is not recommended."

=== Cirrhosis ===
L-ornithine L-aspartate (LOLA), a stable salt of ornithine and aspartic acid, has been used in the treatment of cirrhosis and hepatic encephalopathy.

== See also ==
- Bisorcic
- 3-Methylornithine
