= Carbamoyl phosphate =

- Structural formula

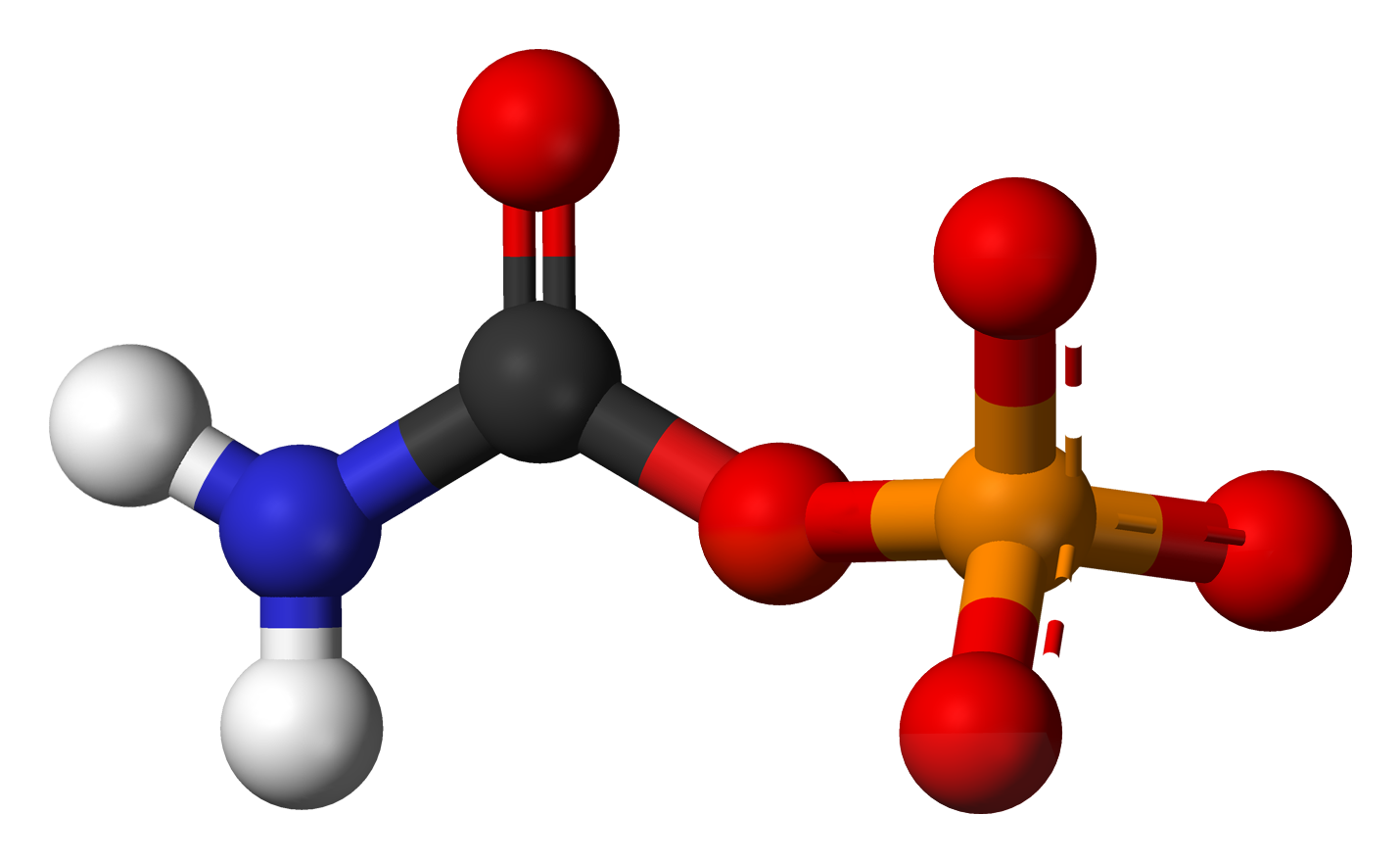
- Ball-and-stick model

Names
- IUPAC name (Carbamoyloxy)phosphonic acid

Identifiers
CAS Number	590-55-6
3D model (JSmol)	Interactive image
ChEBI	CHEBI:17672
ChEMBL	ChEMBL369105
ChemSpider	272
ECHA InfoCard	100.230.975
KEGG	C00169
MeSH	Carbamoyl+phosphate
PubChem CID	278
UNII	GC5KZW01Q3
CompTox Dashboard (EPA)	DTXSID70862253
- InChI: InChI=1S/CH4NO5P/c2-1(3)7-8(4,5)6/h(H2,2,3)(H2,4,5,6) Key: FFQKYPRQEYGKAF-UHFFFAOYSA-N
- SMILES: C(=O)(N)OP(=O)(O)O

Properties
Chemical formula	CH_{2}NO_{5}P^{2−}
Molar mass	141.020 g/mol
- Except where otherwise noted, data are given for materials in their standard state (at 25 °C [77 °F], 100 kPa). verify (what is ?) Infobox references

Carbamoyl phosphate is a biologically important anion. In terrestrial animals, carbamoyl phosphate serves as a metabolic intermediate in both nitrogen disposal through the urea cycle and pyrimidine synthesis. Its enzymatic counterpart, carbamoyl phosphate synthetase I (CPS I), interacts with a class of molecules called sirtuins, NAD dependent protein deacetylases, and ATP to form carbamoyl phosphate. CP then enters the urea cycle in which it reacts with ornithine (a process catalyzed by the enzyme ornithine transcarbamylase) to form citrulline.

== Classification ==
Carbamoyl phosphate is a metabolic intermediate in a pathway that involves nitrogen disposal through the urea cycle and the biosynthesis of pyrimidines.

== Production ==
It is produced from bicarbonate, ammonia (derived from amino acids), and phosphate (from ATP). The synthesis is catalyzed by the enzyme carbamoyl phosphate synthetase. This uses three reactions as follows:

- HCO^{−}_{3} + ATP → ADP + HO–C(O)–OPO^{2−}_{3} (carboxyphosphate)
- HO–C(O)–OPO^{2−}_{3} + NH_{3} + OH^{−} → HPO^{2−}_{4} + ^{−}O–C(O)NH_{2} + H_{2}O
- ^{−}O–C(O)NH_{2} + ATP → ADP + H_{2}NC(O)OPO^{2−}_{3}

== Clinical significance ==
A defect in the CPS I enzyme, and a subsequent deficiency in the production of carbamoyl phosphate has been linked to hyperammonemia in humans.

== See also ==
- Ornithine transcarbamylase
- Citrulline
- Mary Ellen Jones (chemist)
- Urea Cycle
