= Citrin =

Mammalian protein found in humans

SLC25A13

Identifiers
- Aliases: SLC25A13, ARALAR2, CITRIN, CTLN2, solute carrier family 25 member 13, NICCD
- External IDs: OMIM: 603859; MGI: 1354721; GeneCards: SLC25A13
Available structures
PDB	Ortholog search: PDBe RCSB
PDB	List of PDB id codes 4P5W

Gene location (Human)
Chr.	Chromosome 7 (human)
Band	7q21.3	Start	96,120,220 bp
Band	7q21.3	End	96,322,147 bp

Gene location (Mouse)
Chr.	Chromosome 6 (mouse)
Band	6|6 A1	Start	6,041,218 bp
Band	6|6 A1	End	6,217,173 bp
RNA expression pattern
Bgee	Human / Mouse (ortholog); Top expressed in: right lobe of liver; secondary oocyte; retinal pigment epithelium; tibia; corpus callosum; buccal mucosa cell; Epithelium of choroid plexus; Achilles tendon; gonad; inferior ganglion of vagus nerve / Top expressed in: interventricular septum; otic vesicle; left lobe of liver; otic placode; saccule; myocardium of ventricle; cardiac muscles; right kidney; right ventricle; proximal tubule; More reference expression data
BioGPS	n/a
Gene ontology
Molecular function	calcium ion binding; transporter activity; metal ion binding; L-glutamate transmembrane transporter activity; acidic amino acid transmembrane transporter activity; L-aspartate transmembrane transporter activity; identical protein binding; transmembrane transporter activity
Cellular component	membrane; integral component of plasma membrane; mitochondrion; mitochondrial inner membrane; integral component of membrane
Biological process	gluconeogenesis; malate-aspartate shuttle; response to calcium ion; ATP biosynthetic process; transmembrane transport; aspartate transmembrane transport; cellular respiration; L-glutamate transmembrane transport; mitochondrial transport; L-aspartate transmembrane transport
Sources:Amigo / QuickGO
Orthologs
Databases	NCBI: entry; OMA: entry
Species	Human	Mouse
Entrez	10165	50799
Ensembl	ENSG00000004864	ENSMUSG00000015112
UniProt	Q9UJS0	Q9QXX4
RefSeq (mRNA)	NM_001160210; NM_014251	NM_001177572; NM_015829
RefSeq (protein)	NP_001153682; NP_055066	NP_001171043; NP_056644
Location (UCSC)	Chr 7: 96.12 – 96.32 Mb	Chr 6: 6.04 – 6.22 Mb
PubMed search
- Wikidata
View/Edit Human	View/Edit Mouse

Citrin, also known as solute carrier family 25, member 13 (citrin) or SLC25A13, is a protein which in humans is encoded by the SLC25A13 gene.

Citrin is associated with type II citrullinemia and neonatal intrahepatic cholestasis caused by citrin deficiency (NICCD).

== Function ==
Citrin (74 kDa) is a dimeric calcium-activated glutamate/aspartate carrier found in the mitochondrial membrane of mammals. Citrin is one of two isoforms of these mitochondrial calcium-activated glutamate/aspartate carriers found in humans and is predominately expressed in non-excitable tissues.

Upon binding calcium, citrin catalyzes the transport of glutamate and a proton into the mitochondrial matrix in exchange for aspartate transport to the cytosol. Upon being transported by citrin from the mitochondrial matrix to the cytosol, aspartate is converted into oxaloacetate, and then into malate, which is then transported back into the matrix by means of the malate-aspartate shuttle. Upon entering the mitochondrial matrix, malate is converted back into oxaloacetate to participate in the citric acid cycle. Citrin is also important because it supplies liver cells with aspartate that is used during the urea cycle and gluconeogenesis.

== Structure ==
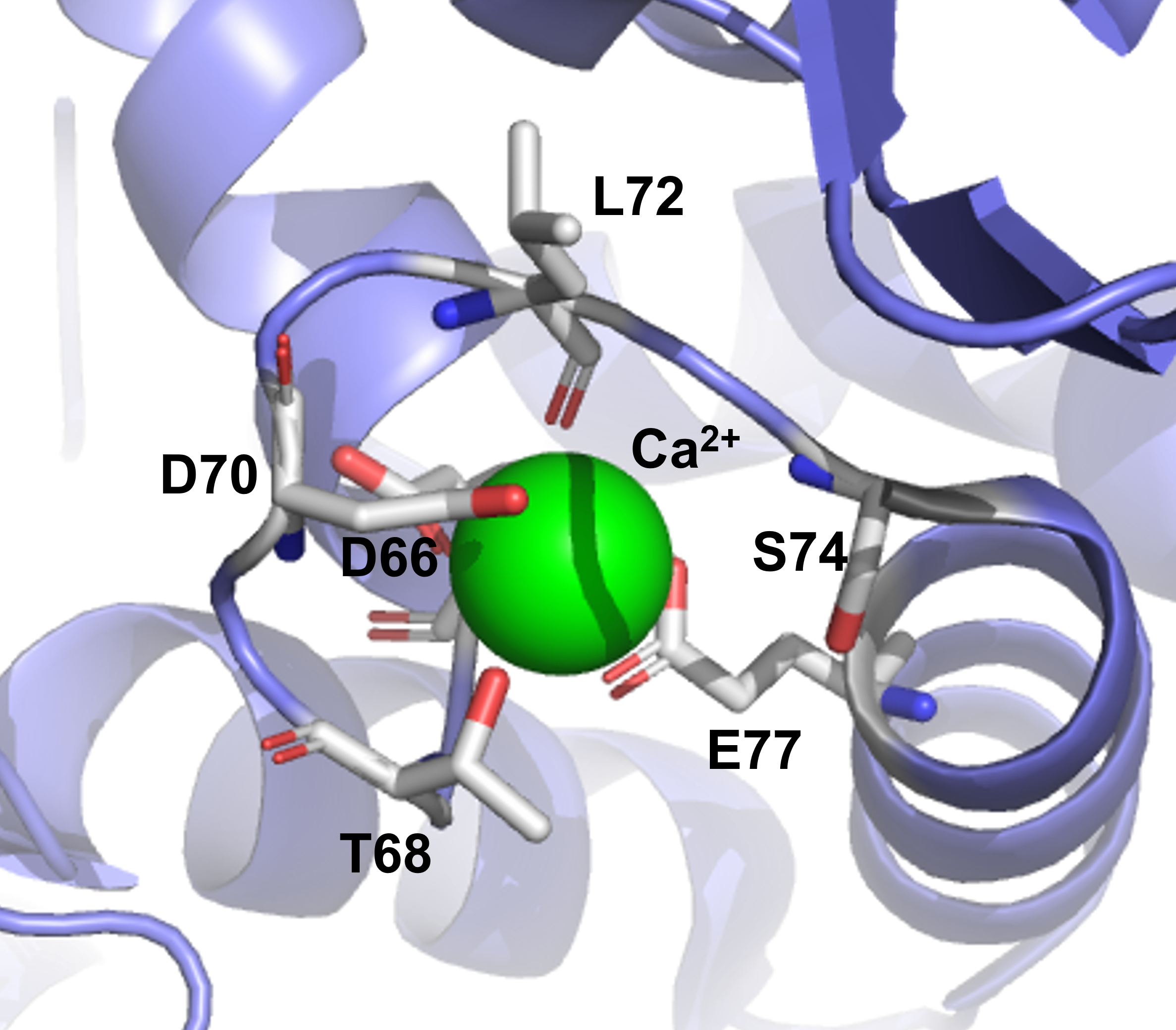
Calcium binding site within the N-terminal domain of citrin (PDB 4P5W).

The citrin monomer peptide has a three-domain structure, consisting of an N-terminal domain, a carrier domain, and a C-terminal domain. The N-terminal domain contains eight EF-hand motifs and is responsible for the binding of a single calcium ion. The N-terminal domain is also responsible for the dimerization of the protein to form the full glutamate/aspartate carrier. The carrier domain is responsible for transport activity and consists of six helical loops that link the N-terminal and C-terminal domains together. The C-terminal domain’s function is not fully understood yet, but it is thought to be an extra helix for the carrier domain to help account for its hydrophobicity.

Upon the binding of two calcium ions to the citrin dimer’s N-terminal domains, a structural change causes an amphipathic helix within the C-terminal domain to bind to a hydrophobic loop within the N-terminal domain, causing an opening. This opening gives the substrates such as glutamate and aspartate access to the inner carrier domain which transports them across the membrane. Upon the unbinding of calcium, the first and second EF motifs within the N-terminal domain block off and close the opening, preventing the passage of substrates.

== Diseases ==
Citrin deficiency is a liver metabolic disease and urea cycle disorder caused by mutations in the SLC25A13 gene, which codes for the citrin protein. Most of these mutations lead to an unfunctional citrin protein, meaning it cannot work to properly transport aspartate from the mitochondria to the cytosol. Aspartate plays a vital role in the urea cycle by reacting with citrulline to form argininosuccinate. Without adequate amounts of aspartate in the cytosol, this intermediate step in the urea cycle cannot happen, leading to an increase in the concentration of citrulline, ammonia, and other toxins since they can no longer be converted to urea by the liver.

== See also ==
- Solute carrier family
- Citrin deficiency
