= Citrullinemia type I =

- Other names: Argininosuccinate synthase deficiency, ASS deficiency, Argininosuccinic acid synthase deficiency
- Citrullinemia type I is autosomal recessive

Citrullinemia type I (CTLN1), also known as arginosuccinate synthetase deficiency, is a rare disease caused by a deficiency in argininosuccinate synthetase, an enzyme involved in excreting excess nitrogen from the body. There are mild and severe forms of the disease, which is one of the urea cycle disorders.

== Signs and symptoms ==
Signs and symptoms of CTLN1 in infants are caused by increasing levels of ammonia in the blood and cerebrospinal fluid and include excessive vomiting, anorexia, refusal to eat, irritability, increased intracranial pressure, and worsening lethargy, seizures, hypotonia, respiratory distress, hepatomegaly, and cerebral edema. These symptoms appear within days of birth in the more severe forms of the disease with complete deficiency of the enzyme. As ammonia accumulates further, the affected infant may enter a hyperammonemic coma, which indicates neurological damage and can cause developmental delays, cognitive disabilities, cerebral palsy, hypertonia, spasticity, ankle clonus, seizures, and liver failure.

Milder forms of the disease are caused by partial arginosuccinate synthetase deficiency and may manifest in childhood or in adulthood. Symptoms of mild CTLN1 include failure to thrive, avoidance of high-protein foods, ataxia, worsening lethargy, and vomiting. Hyperammonemic coma can still develop in these people. CTLN1 can also develop in the perinatal period.

== Genetics ==
ASS1 is the gene mutated in citrullinemia type I. Mutations in this gene have an autosomal recessive mode of inheritance.

== Pathogenesis ==
Arginosuccinate synthetase is an enzyme in the urea cycle, which removes excess ammonia from the body. When it is deficient, either fully or partially, ammonia can build up and cause the signs and symptoms of CTLN1.

== Diagnosis ==
As one of the urea cycle disorders, citrullinemia type I needs to be distinguished from the others: carbamoyl phosphate synthetase deficiency, argininosuccinic acid lyase deficiency, ornithine transcarbamylase deficiency, arginase deficiency, and N-Acetylglutamate synthase deficiency. Other diseases that may appear similar to CTLN1 include the organic acidemias and citrin deficiency. To diagnose CTLN1, a blood test for citrulline and ammonia levels can indicate the correct diagnosis; high levels of both are indicative of this disorder. Newborns are routinely screened for CTLN1 at birth. A genetic test is the only definitive way to diagnose it.

== Treatment ==
The main treatments for CTLN1 include a low-protein, high-calorie diet with amino acid supplements, particularly arginine. The Ucyclyd protocol, using buphenyl and ammonul, is used for treatment as well. Hyperammonemia is treated with hemodialysis; intravenous arginine, sodium benzoate, and sodium phenylacetate. In some cases, liver transplantation may be a viable treatment. L-carnitine is used in some treatment protocols.

== Epidemiology ==
1 in 57,000 babies in the US are affected.
