= Argininosuccinate synthetase 1 =

Protein-coding gene in the species Homo sapiens

ASS1
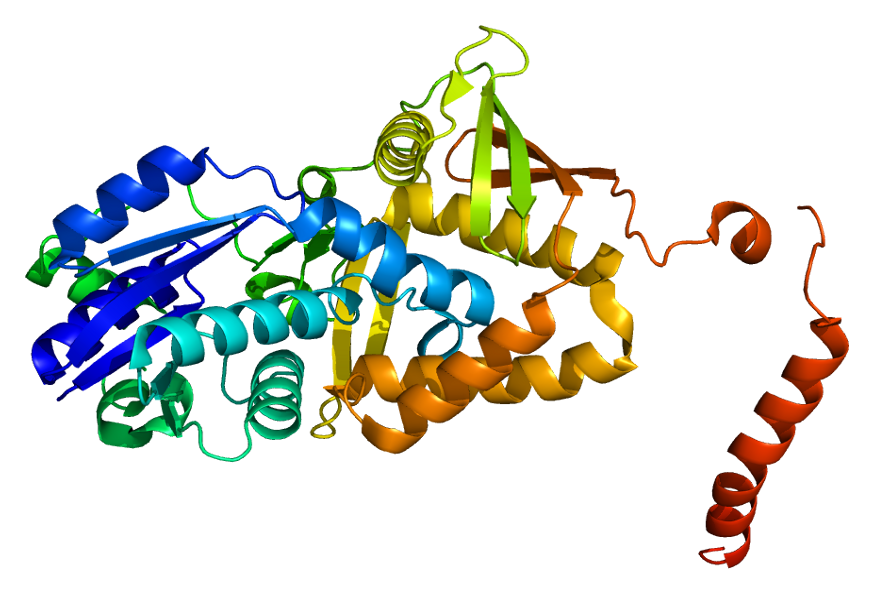

Identifiers
- Aliases: ASS1, ASS, CTLN1, Argininosuccinate synthetase 1, argininosuccinate synthase 1
- External IDs: OMIM: 603470; MGI: 88090; GeneCards: ASS1
Available structures
PDB	Ortholog search: PDBe RCSB
PDB	List of PDB id codes 2NZ2
Enzyme activity
EC #	BRENDA	ExPASy	KEGG	MetaCyc
6.3.4.5	↗	↗	↗	↗

Gene location (Human)
Chr.	Chromosome 9 (human)
Band	9q34.11	Start	130,444,961 bp
Band	9q34.11	End	130,501,274 bp

Gene location (Mouse)
Chr.	Chromosome 2 (mouse)
Band	2 B|2 21.81 cM	Start	31,360,219 bp
Band	2 B|2 21.81 cM	End	31,410,684 bp
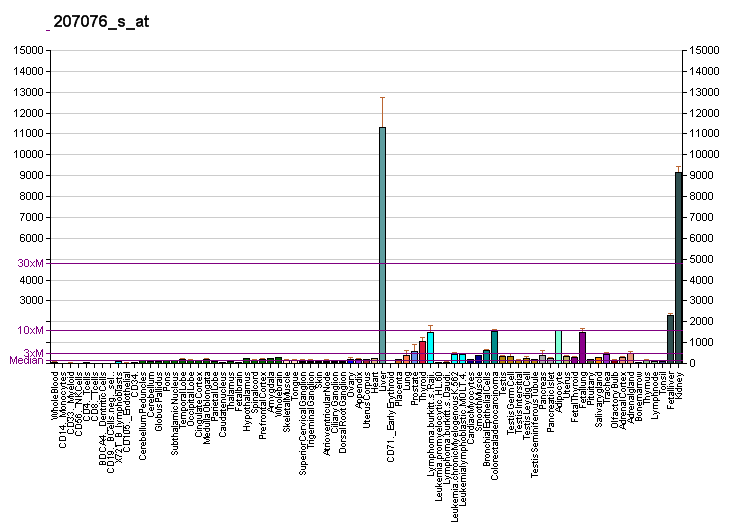
RNA expression pattern
Bgee	Human / Mouse (ortholog); Top expressed in: right lobe of liver; palpebral conjunctiva; kidney tubule; glomerulus; metanephric glomerulus; corpus epididymis; adipose tissue; rectum; human kidney; mucosa of transverse colon / Top expressed in: human kidney; right kidney; hepatobiliary system; exocrine gland; liver; renal cortex; proximal tubule; yolk sac; placenta; blastocyst; More reference expression data
BioGPS	More reference expression data
Gene ontology
Molecular function	nucleotide binding; amino acid binding; ligase activity; protein binding; identical protein binding; ATP binding; argininosuccinate synthase activity; RNA binding; toxic substance binding
Cellular component	extracellular exosome; mitochondrion; myelin sheath; cytoplasm; cytosol; nucleus; mitochondrial outer membrane; lysosome; endoplasmic reticulum; neuron projection; soma; perikaryon; cell body fiber
Biological process	aspartate metabolic process; cellular response to laminar fluid shear stress; urea cycle; positive regulation of nitric oxide biosynthetic process; negative regulation of leukocyte cell-cell adhesion; cellular amino acid biosynthetic process; citrulline metabolic process; argininosuccinate metabolic process; arginine biosynthetic process; kidney development; liver development; acute-phase response; midgut development; ageing; response to nutrient; circadian rhythm; response to toxic substance; response to zinc ion; response to mycotoxin; response to amine; response to estradiol; response to lipopolysaccharide; response to amino acid; response to peptide hormone; response to steroid hormone; response to glucocorticoid; response to growth hormone; diaphragm development; response to fatty acid; cellular response to lipopolysaccharide; cellular response to amino acid stimulus; cellular response to ammonium ion; cellular response to cAMP; cellular response to interferon-gamma; cellular response to tumor necrosis factor; cellular response to glucagon stimulus; cellular response to oleic acid; cellular response to amine stimulus; cellular response to dexamethasone stimulus
Sources:Amigo / QuickGO
Orthologs
Databases	NCBI: entry; OMA: entry
Species	Human	Mouse
Entrez	445	11898
Ensembl	ENSG00000130707	ENSMUSG00000076441
UniProt	P00966	P16460
RefSeq (mRNA)	NM_000050; NM_054012	NM_007494
RefSeq (protein)	NP_000041; NP_446464	NP_031520
Location (UCSC)	Chr 9: 130.44 – 130.5 Mb	Chr 2: 31.36 – 31.41 Mb
PubMed search
- Wikidata
View/Edit Human	View/Edit Mouse

Argininosuccinate synthetase is an enzyme that in humans is encoded by the ASS1 gene.

The protein encoded by this gene catalyzes the penultimate step of the arginine biosynthetic pathway. There are approximately 10 to 14 copies of this gene including the pseudogenes scattered across the human genome, among which the one located on chromosome 9 appears to be the only functional gene for argininosuccinate synthetase. Two transcript variants encoding the same protein have been found for this gene.

== Clinical significance ==
Mutations in the chromosome 9 copy of ASS cause citrullinemia.

Arginine is considered a non-essential amino acid since normal cells can synthesize it from citrulline and aspartate using the enzymes argininosuccinate synthase 1 (ASS1) and argininosuccinate lyase (ASL). Consequently, depleting arginine can be an effective therapeutic approach. Notably, over 70% of tumors show reduced ASS1 transcription, making these cancer cells reliant on external sources of arginine, which forms the basis of arginine-deprivation therapy.

The investigational drug pegargiminase that degrades arginine is currently in trials for the treatment of ASS1 deficient cancers.
