= Charles Brenner (biochemist) =

American biologist

- Born: October 30, 1961
- Education: Wesleyan University (BA); Stanford University (PhD); Brandeis University
- Known for: Discovery and characterization of nicotinamide riboside as a vitamin Discovery of glycerol-3-phosphate as activator of ChREBP
- Awards: Fellow of the American Association for the Advancement of Science
- Scientific career
- Fields: Enzymology; Metabolism
- Workplaces: University of Helsinki; City of Hope National Medical Center; University of Iowa; Dartmouth Medical School; Thomas Jefferson University
- Thesis: Specificity and Activity of the Kex2 Protease: From Yeast Genetics to Enzyme Kinetics (1993)
- Doctoral advisor: Robert S. Fuller
- Other academic advisors: Gregory A. Petsko; Dagmar Ringe
- Website: brennerlab.net

Charles Brenner (born October 30, 1961) holds the position of Professor of Metabolic Regulation at University of Helsinki, having been recruited with support of the Research Council of Finland. Prior to this, he held the inaugural Alfred E Mann Family Foundation Chair of the Department of Diabetes & Cancer Metabolism at the Beckman Research Institute of the City of Hope National Medical Center and served as the Roy J. Carver Chair and head of biochemistry at the University of Iowa.

Brenner is a major contributor in the field of nicotinamide adenine dinucleotide (NAD) metabolism and has developed targeted, quantitative methods for NAD metabolomics. Brenner discovered eukaryotic nicotinamide riboside (NR) kinase and nucleosidase pathways to NAD. Brenner's work includes the first human trial of NR, which demonstrated safe oral availability as an NAD+ precursor. His work characterized ways in which the NAD system is disrupted by diseases and conditions of metabolic stress. Further, he identified a specific mechanism by which citrin deficiency results in sweet aversion and metabolic dysfunction-associated steatotic liver disease (MASLD), and identified glycerol-3-phosphate as the activator of carbohydrate response element binding protein (ChREBP).

== Education and career ==
Brenner graduated from Wesleyan University with a bachelor's degree in biology in 1983. After working for the biotechnology companies Chiron Corporation and DNAX Research Institute, Brenner attended graduate school at Stanford University School of Medicine. At Stanford he worked with Robert S. Fuller, receiving his Ph.D. in Cancer Biology in 1993. Brenner conducted post-doctoral research at Brandeis University with Gregory Petsko and Dagmar Ringe.

Brenner then joined the faculty at Thomas Jefferson University, where he worked from 1996 to 2003, becoming Director of the Structural Biology & Bioinformatics Program in 2000. He moved to Dartmouth Medical School in 2003, serving as associate director for Basic Sciences at Norris Cotton Cancer Center (now named Dartmouth Cancer Center) from 2003 to 2009. In 2009 he joined the University of Iowa (UI) as Professor and Head of Biochemistry. In 2010 he was awarded the Roy J. Carver Chair of Biochemistry at UI, holding that position until 2020.

In 2020, Brenner joined City of Hope National Medical Center in Duarte, California as the inaugural chair of a new department of diabetes and cancer metabolism created to focus at the intersection of metabolic disturbances with diseases such as cancer and diabetes.

Brenner has been funded by agencies including the March of Dimes, the Burroughs Wellcome Fund, the Beckman Foundation, the Lung Cancer Research Foundation, the Bill & Melinda Gates Foundation, the Leukemia & Lymphoma Society, the National Science Foundation the National Institutes of Health and the Sigrid Juselius Foundation.

== Research contributions ==
Brenner has made multiple contributions to molecular biology and biochemistry, beginning with purification and characterization of the Kex2 proprotein convertase at Stanford. Significant research projects include the role of Ap_{3}A binding in the function of the FHIT tumor suppressor gene, characterization and inhibition of DNA methylation, and discovery of new steps in nicotinamide adenine dinucleotide (NAD) metabolism.

Notably, the Brenner laboratory discovered that eukaryotes use nicotinamide riboside (NR) to make NAD+. Bieganowski and Brenner (2004) found that NR is converted to NAD+ through the action of nicotinamide ribose kinases including Nrk1 (yeast and human) and Nrk2 (human). Belenky et al. (Cell, 2007) reported another pathway which turns NR into NAM through the action of nucleosidases Urh1/Pnp1/Meu1 and is Nrk1 independent.

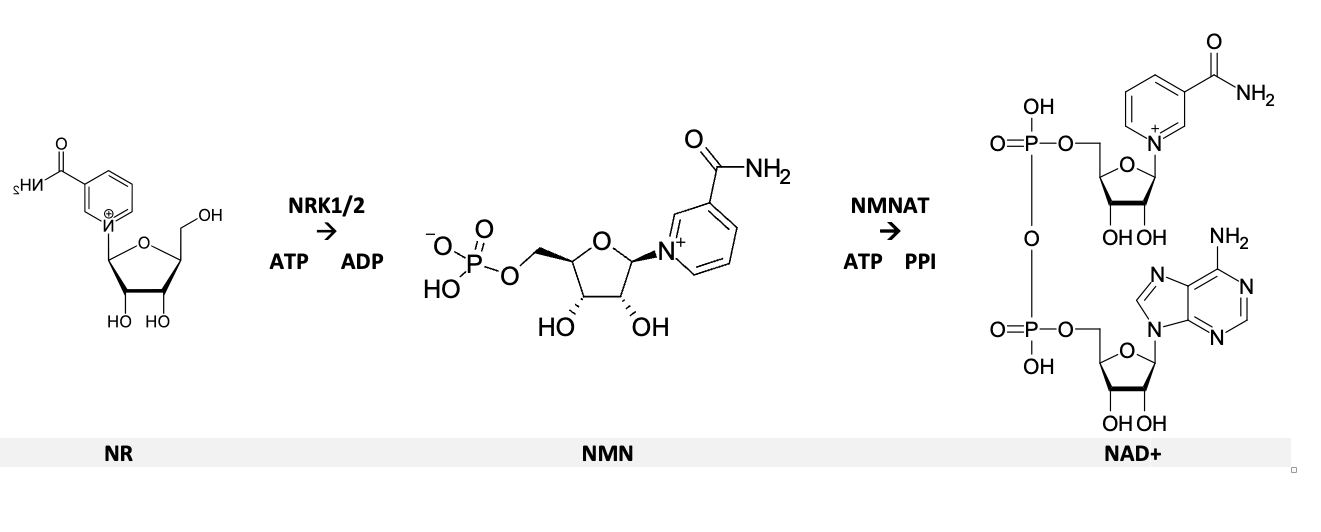
NRK1/2 mediated pathway from NR to NAD+

Brenner has developed targeted, quantitative analysis of the NAD+ metabolome and made fundamental contributions to NAD metabolism including discovery of nicotinic acid riboside-dependent NAD synthesis, elucidating the mechanism of synthesis of nicotinic acid adenine dinucleotide phosphate, and discovering multiple conditions in which NAD metabolism is dysregulated in disease.

Brenner is active in translating NR technologies to treat and prevent human conditions that disturb the NAD system including cancer diabetic and chemotherapeutic peripheral neuropathy, heart failure, central brain injury, inflammation, mitochondrial myopathy pellagra, and infections such as coronavirus infection Brenner's work included the first human trial of NR in 2016, which demonstrated safe oral availability as an NAD+ precursor, thereby creating the foundational intellectual property for the NAD boosting industry. Though Brenner was the first to show that NR increases SIR2 activity, improves gene silencing, and can extend yeast lifespan, his work has not emphasized sirtuins or nonspecific anti-aging claims and instead emphasizes how NR repairs inflammatory conditions and metabolic stresses that dysregulate NAD+ and NADPH.

External videos
- "Combating Postpartum Metabolic Stress/Cell Reports, Jan. 22, 2019 (Vol. 22, Issue 4)".

Examining rodents and their offspring, Brenner has showed that rodent postpartum mothers are under severe metabolic stress to their NAD system. Supplementing rodent mothers with NR increases maternal weight loss, advances juvenile development and provides long lasting neurodevelopmental advantages into adulthood.

Considering citrin deficiency as a lean MASLD syndrome, he identified accumulation of glycerol-3-phosphate and activation of ChREBP as the mechanism of both elevated expression of FGF21 and elevated lipogenic transcription in this rare disease.

Brenner is an author of more than 200 peer-reviewed publications. He was the senior editor of the 2004 book, Oncogenomics: Molecular Approaches to Cancer.

Brenner is both cautious and critical of research that promotes claims of anti-aging and longevity. After writing a favorable review of Steven Austad's book Methuselah's Zoo, he reviewed Lifespan: Why We Age – and Why We Don't Have To by David A. Sinclair, summarizing it as "an influential source of misinformation on longevity, featuring counterfactual claims about longevity genes being conserved between yeast and humans, the existence of supposed activators of these genes, and claimed successful age reversal in mice based on partial reprogramming." Brenner published a major review of sirtuins in 2022 entitled "Sirtuins are not conserved longevity genes".

== Educational contributions ==
External videos
- "Charles Brenner: ASBMB Award for Exemplary Contributions to Education Lecture", May 25, 2016.

In 2012, Brenner and Dagmar Ringe developed pre-medical curriculum recommendations that would be consistent with a revised Medical College Admission Test (MCAT), following a request from the President of the American Society for Biochemistry and Molecular Biology, Suzanne Pfeffer. The recommendations, which include development of inorganic, organic and biochemistry coursework that is more geared toward the chemistry of bioorganic functional groups, have been further refined in academic journals. Brenner's contribution to this area was recognized by the 2016 ASBMB Award for Exemplary Contributions to Education.

== Industrial collaborations ==
Brenner is a former member of the Scientific Advisory Board of Sirtris Pharmaceuticals. He currently serves as chief scientific advisor of Niagen Bioscience and NADMED.

== Awards ==
- 1998–2000, Basil O'Connor Scholar, March of Dimes Birth Defects Foundation
- 1998–2000, Beckman Young Investigators Award, Arnold and Mabel Beckman Foundation
- 1998–2001, New Investigator in the Pharmacological Sciences, Burroughs Wellcome Fund
- 2007, William E.M. Lands Lectureship, University of Michigan Medical School
- 2013, Fellow, American Association for the Advancement of Science
- 2016, ASBMB Award for Exemplary Contributions to Education, American Society for Biochemistry and Molecular Biology
- 2020, Mary Swartz Rose Senior Investigator Award, American Society for Nutrition

== Selected publications ==
- Tiwari, V. Jin, Byungchang; Sun, Olivia; LopezGonzalez, Edwin D. J.; Chen, Min-Hsuan; Wu, Xiwei; Shah, Hardik; Zhang, Andrew; Herman, Mark A.; Spracklen, Cassandra N.; Goodman, Russell P.; Brenner, Charles (November 2025). "Glycerol-3-phosphate activates ChREBP, FGF21 transcription and lipogenesis in citrin deficiency". Nature Metabolism. 7 (11): 2284–2299. doi:10.1038/s42255-025-01399-3. ISSN 2522-5812. PMC 12638245
- Brenner, C (2022-09-22). "Sirtuins are not conserved longevity genes". Life Metabolism (2): 122–133. doi:10.1093/lifemeta/loac025. ISSN 2755-0230. PMC 10081735. PMID 37035412.
- Brenner, C (January 2022). "Viral infection as an NAD+ battlefield". Nature Metabolism. 4 (1): 2–3. doi:10.1038/s42255-021-00507-3. ISSN 2522-5812. PMC 10155260. PMID 34980922. S2CID 245654307.
- Heer, CD; Sanderson, DJ; Voth, LS; Alhammad, YMO; Schmidt, MS; Trammell, SAJ; Perlman, S; Cohen, MS; Fehr, AR; Brenner, C (2020-10-13). "Coronavirus infection and PARP expression dysregulate the NAD Metabolome: an actionable component of innate immunity". Journal of Biological Chemistry. 295 (52): 17986–17996. doi:10.1074/jbc.RA120.015138. PMC 7834058. PMID 33051211.
- Vaur, P; Brugg, B; Mericskay, M; Li, Z; Schmidt, M S.; Vivien, D; Orset, C; Jacotot, E; Brenner, C (December 2017). "Nicotinamide riboside, a form of vitamin B3, protects against excitotoxicity-induced axonal degeneration". FASEB Journal. 31 (12): 5440–5452. doi:10.1096/fj.201700221RR. ISSN 1530-6860. PMID 28842432.
- Trammell, SAJ; Schmidt, MS; Weidemann, BJ; Redpath, P; Jaksch, F; Dellinger, RW; Li, Z; Abel, ED; Migaud, ME; Brenner, C (10 October 2016). "Nicotinamide riboside is uniquely and orally bioavailable in mice and humans". Nature Communications. 7 (1) 12948. Bibcode:2016NatCo...712948T. doi:10.1038/ncomms12948. PMC 5062546. PMID 27721479.
- Trammell, SAJ; Weidemann, BJ; Chadda, A; Yorek, MS; Holmes, A; Coppey, LJ; Obrosov, A; Kardon, RH; Yorek, MA; Brenner, C (2016). "Nicotinamide Riboside Opposes Type 2 Diabetes and Neuropathy in Mice". Scientific Reports. 6 26933. Bibcode:2016NatSR...626933T. doi:10.1038/srep26933. PMC 4882590. PMID 27230286.
- Wu, B-K; Brenner, C (2014). "Suppression of TET1-Dependent DNA Demethylation Is Essential for KRAS-Mediated Transformation". Cell Reports. 9 (5): 1827–1840. doi:10.1016/j.celrep.2014.10.063. PMC 4268240. PMID 25466250.
- Fagan, RL; Cryderman, DE; Kopelovich, L; Wallrath, LL; Brenner, C (2013). "Laccaic Acid A Is a Direct, DNA-competitive Inhibitor of DNA Methyltransferase 1". J. Biol. Chem. 288 (33): 23858–23867. doi:10.1074/jbc.M113.480517. PMC 3745332. PMID 23839987.
- Brenner, C (2013). "Changes in Chemistry and Biochemistry Education: Creative Responses to MCAT Revisions in the Age of the Genome". Biochemistry and Molecular Biology Education. 41 (1): 1–4. doi:10.1002/bmb.20653. PMID 23281187. S2CID 4659938.
- Brenner, C (2013). "Rethinking Premedical and Health Professional Curricula in Light of MCAT 2015" (PDF). J. Chem. Educ. 90 (7): 807–812. Bibcode:2013JChEd..90..807B. doi:10.1021/ed4002738. S2CID 98274150.
- Syeda, F; Fagan, RL; Wean, M; Avvakumov, GV; Walker, JR; Xue, S; Dhe-Paganon, S; Brenner, C (2011). "The Replication Focus Targeting Sequence (RFTS) Domain is a DNA-Competitive Inhibitor of Dnmt1". J. Biol. Chem. 286 (17): 15344–15351. doi:10.1074/jbc.M110.209882. PMC 3083197. PMID 21389349.
- Bogan, KL; Brenner, C (1 August 2008). "Nicotinic Acid, Nicotinamide, and Nicotinamide Riboside: A Molecular Evaluation of NAD + Precursor Vitamins in Human Nutrition". Annual Review of Nutrition. 28 (1): 115–130. doi:10.1146/annurev.nutr.28.061807.155443. ISSN 0199-9885. PMID 18429699.
- Tempel, W; Rabeh, WM; Bogan, KL; Belenky, P; Wojcik, M; Seidle, HF; Nedyalkova, L; Yang, T; Sauve, AA; Park, HW; Brenner, C (2007-10-02). "Nicotinamide riboside kinase structures reveal new pathways to NAD+". PLOS Biology. 5 (10) e263. doi:10.1371/journal.pbio.0050263. ISSN 1545-7885. PMC 1994991. PMID 17914902.
- Robu, ME; Larson, JD; Nasevicius, A; Beiraghi, S; Brenner, C; Farber, SA; Ekker, SC (25 May 2007). "p53 Activation by Knockdown Technologies". PLOS Genetics. 3 (5) e78. doi:10.1371/journal.pgen.0030078. ISSN 1553-7404. PMC 1877875. PMID 17530925. S2CID 9914091.
- Belenky, P; Bogan, KL; Brenner, C (January 2007). "NAD+ metabolism in health and disease". Trends in Biochemical Sciences. 32 (1): 12–19. doi:10.1016/j.tibs.2006.11.006. PMID 17161604.
- Belenky, P; Racette, FG; Bogan, KL; McClure, JM; Smith, JS; Brenner, C (4 May 2007). "Nicotinamide riboside promotes Sir2 silencing and extends lifespan via Nrk and Urh1/Pnp1/Meu1 pathways to NAD+". Cell. 129 (3): 473–84. doi:10.1016/j.cell.2007.03.024. PMID 17482543. S2CID 4661723.
- Bieganowski, P; Brenner, C (2004). "Discoveries of Nicotinamide Riboside as a Nutrient and Conserved NRK Genes Establish a Preiss-Handler Independent Route to NAD+ in Fungi and Humans". Cell. 117 (4): 495–502. doi:10.1016/S0092-8674(04)00416-7. PMID 15137942. S2CID 4642295.
- Brenner, C; Duggan, D, eds. (2004). Oncogenomics: Molecular approaches to cancer. Hoboken, N.J.: Wiley-Liss. ISBN 0-471-22592-4.
- Trapasso, F; Krakowiak, A; Cesari, R; Arkles, J; Yendamuri, S; Ishii, H; Vecchione, A; Kuroki, T; Bieganowski, P; Pace, HC; Huebner, K; Croce, CM; Brenner, C; et al. (18 February 2003). "Designed FHIT alleles establish that Fhit-induced apoptosis in cancer cells is limited by substrate binding". Proceedings of the National Academy of Sciences of the United States of America. 100 (4): 1592–7. Bibcode:2003PNAS..100.1592T. doi:10.1073/pnas.0437915100. PMC 149877. PMID 12574506.
- Draganescu, A; Hodawadekar, SC; Gee, KR; Brenner, C (2000). "Fhit-Nucleotide Specificity Probed with Novel Fluorescent and Fluorogenic Substrates". J. Biol. Chem. 275 (7): 4555–4560. doi:10.1074/jbc.275.7.4555. PMC 2556043. PMID 10671479.
- Brenner, C; Fuller, RS (1992). "Structural and Enzymatic Characterization of a Purified Prohormone-Processing Enzyme: Secreted, Soluble Kex2 Protease". Proc. Natl. Acad. Sci. 89 (3): 922–926. Bibcode:1992PNAS...89..922B. doi:10.1073/pnas.89.3.922. PMC 48357. PMID 1736307.
