= Diamine transaminase =

diamine transaminase

Identifiers
- EC no.: 2.6.1.29
- CAS no.: 9031-83-8

Databases
- IntEnz: IntEnz view
- BRENDA: BRENDA entry
- ExPASy: NiceZyme view
- KEGG: KEGG entry
- MetaCyc: metabolic pathway
- PRIAM: profile
- PDB structures: RCSB PDB PDBe PDBsum
- Gene Ontology: AmiGO / QuickGO
Search
- PMC: articles
- PubMed: articles
- NCBI: proteins

In enzymology, a diamine transaminase (EC 2.6.1.29) is an enzyme that catalyzes the chemical reaction:

an alpha,omega-diamine + 2-oxoglutarate $\rightleftharpoons$ an omega-aminoaldehyde + L-glutamate

Thus, the two substrates of this enzyme are alpha,omega-diamine and 2-oxoglutarate, whereas its two products are omega-aminoaldehyde and L-glutamate.

This enzyme belongs to the family of transferases, specifically the transaminases, which transfer nitrogenous groups. The systematic name of this enzyme class is diamine:2-oxoglutarate aminotransferase. Other names in common use include amine transaminase, amine-ketoacid transaminase, diamine aminotransferase, and diamine-ketoglutaric transaminase. This enzyme participates in urea cycle and metabolism of amino groups.
