= William E.M. Lands =

American nutritional biochemist (born 1930)

- Born: July 22, 1930 (age 95)
- Occupation: Biochemist

William E.M. Lands (born July 22, 1930) is an American nutritional biochemist who is among the world's foremost authorities on essential fatty acids.

== Biography ==
Lands graduated from University of Michigan in 1951 and served on the faculty there from 1955 to 1980. He then moved to University of Illinois Chicago (1980–1990) and subsequently the National Institutes of Health (1990–2002), where he served as the senior scientific advisor to the director of the National Institute on Alcohol Abuse and Alcoholism. He was named a Fellow by the American Society for Nutrition, Society for Redox Biology and Medicine, International Society for the Study of Fatty Acids and Lipids, and American Association for the Advancement of Science. Lands is credited for discovering the beneficial effects of balancing the effects of excess omega-6 fatty acids with dietary omega-3 fatty acids. The effect of essential fatty acids on formation of hormones is documented in his book, "Fish, Omega-3 and Human Health" and in interviews for the lay public. University of Michigan's Department of Biological Chemistry endowed a "Lectureship on the Biochemical Basis for the Physiology of Essential Nutrients" in honor of William E.M. Lands.

Upon receipt of a Pfizer Biomedical Research Award in 1985, Lands developed an empirical mathematical relationship showing how metabolism of dietary omega-3 and omega-6 essential fatty acids leads to predictable proportions of their elongated highly unsaturated derivatives (HUFA) accumulated in tissue lipids. After retirement, he changed from publishing as William E.M. Lands to Bill Lands as he put increased attention to primary prevention of health disorders related to excessive actions of omega-6 mediators and describing consequences of imbalanced dietary intakes of omega-3 and omega-6 nutrients. More recently, Lands described an Omega 3-6 Balance Score that indicates the likely impact of individual food items on the balance of HUFA accumulated in tissues. Lands emphasized that efficient conversion of linoleic acid (18:2n-6) to the n-6 highly unsaturated fatty acid (n-6HUFA), arachidonic acid (20:4n-6), competitively displaces n-3 HUFA from tissue phospholipids and creates a narrow therapeutic window for dietary linoleic in the absence of n-3 nutrients. The HUFA balance seen with a finger-tip blood-spot assay monitors dietary intakes of essential fatty acids and predicts the likely intensity of n-6 eicosanoid-mediated pathophysiology.

He was a science advisor for the seafood and omega 3 supplement company Vital Choice. He held a position as director at the Omega Protein Corporation that provides omega-3 rich fish oil for the supplement industry. A company that he also held shares in.

== Lectures ==
Lands Lecturers have included:

- 2005 Hee Young Kim from NIAAA on essentiality of docosahexaenoic acid in the brain
- 2006 James C. Fleet from Purdue University on molecular actions of Vitamin D
- 2007 Charles Brenner from University of Iowa on discovery of new regulated steps in NAD metabolism
- 2008 Christopher J. Frederickson from University of Texas Medical Branch on zinc secreting cells
- 2009 Richard Wurtman from Massachusetts Institute of Technology on nutrition and synapse health
- 2010 Patrick J. Stover from Cornell University on folate-genome interactions
- 2011 Vadim Gladyshev from Harvard University on selenium and redox biology
- 2012 Noa Noy from Case Western Reserve University on retinoic acid signaling in metabolic diseases
- 2013 Bruce Hammock from University of California, Davis on omega-3 fatty acids and cancer
- 2014 Andrew Dannenberg from Weill Medical College on adipose inflammation and breast cancer
- 2015 Alan Brash from Vanderbilt University on arachidonic acid metabolites and their role in pathophysiological processes
- 2016 David Sabatini from the Whitehead Institute on amino acid sensing mechanisms
- 2017 Robert Farese, Jr from Harvard Medical School on fat synthesis and storage in lipid droplets
- 2018 Steven Kliewer from Texas Southwestern Medical Center on metabolic stress hormone FGF21
- 2019 Peter Tontonoz from University of California, Los Angeles on physiological roles of phospholipid remodeling by LPCAT3
- 2020 Jean Schaffer from Harvard Medical School on metabolic programming mediated by small nucleolar RNAs
- 2021 Patrick O. Brown from Stanford University and Impossible Foods on plant-based meats
- 2024 Tobias Walther from Sloan Kettering Institute on mechanisms and physiology of lipid metabolism
- 2025 Brent Stockwell from Columbia University on ferroptosis and metabolism

== Classics Reprints in Biological Chemistry ==
The Journal of Biological Chemistry named his 1958 paper Nicole Kresge, Robert D. Simoni, and Robert L. Hill, Journal of Biological Chemistry Classics, v. 284, p. e3, 2009 a "Classic" and published a "Reflections" overview of his work in 2011 Nicole Kresge, Robert D. Simoni, and Robert L. Hill, Journal of Biological Chemistry Classics, v. 286, p. e3, 2011.

== Selected publications ==
- Fish and Human Health (1986)
- Fish, Omega-3 and Human Health, Second Edition (2005)

== Website ==
- https://efaeducation.org/
