= Argininosuccinate synthase =

Enzyme

ASS1
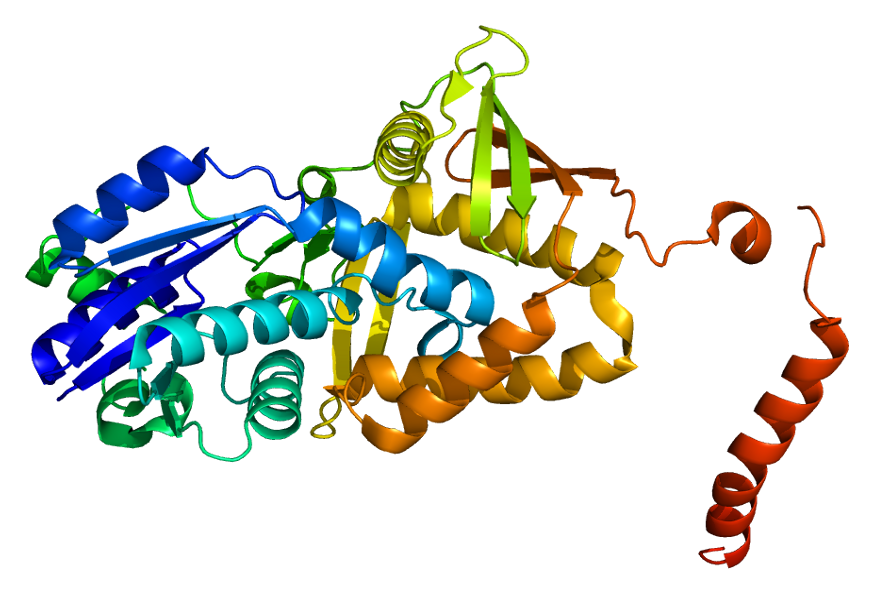

Identifiers
- Aliases: ASS1, ASS, CTLN1, Argininosuccinate synthetase 1, argininosuccinate synthase 1
- External IDs: OMIM: 603470; MGI: 88090; GeneCards: ASS1
Available structures
PDB	Ortholog search: PDBe RCSB
PDB	List of PDB id codes 2NZ2
Enzyme activity
EC #	BRENDA	ExPASy	KEGG	MetaCyc
6.3.4.5	↗	↗	↗	↗

Gene location (Human)
Chr.	Chromosome 9 (human)
Band	9q34.11	Start	130,444,961 bp
Band	9q34.11	End	130,501,274 bp

Gene location (Mouse)
Chr.	Chromosome 2 (mouse)
Band	2 B|2 21.81 cM	Start	31,360,219 bp
Band	2 B|2 21.81 cM	End	31,410,684 bp
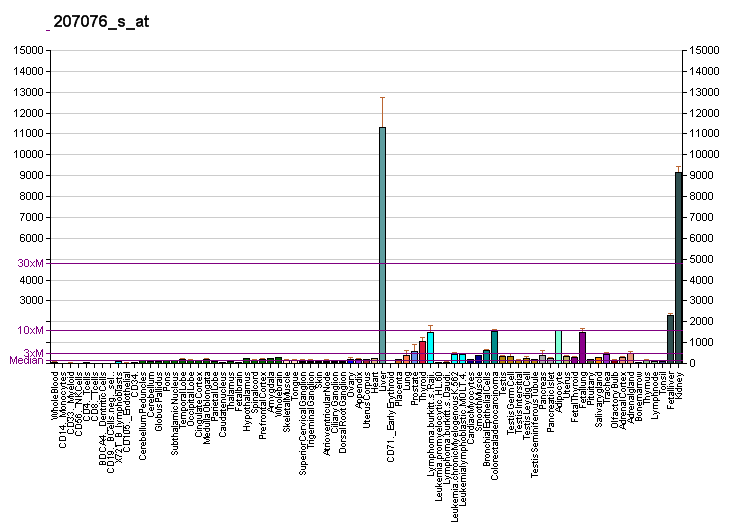
RNA expression pattern
Bgee	Human / Mouse (ortholog); Top expressed in: right lobe of liver; palpebral conjunctiva; kidney tubule; glomerulus; metanephric glomerulus; corpus epididymis; adipose tissue; rectum; human kidney; mucosa of transverse colon / Top expressed in: human kidney; right kidney; hepatobiliary system; exocrine gland; liver; renal cortex; proximal tubule; yolk sac; placenta; blastocyst; More reference expression data
BioGPS	More reference expression data
Gene ontology
Molecular function	nucleotide binding; amino acid binding; ligase activity; protein binding; identical protein binding; ATP binding; argininosuccinate synthase activity; RNA binding; toxic substance binding
Cellular component	extracellular exosome; mitochondrion; myelin sheath; cytoplasm; cytosol; nucleus; mitochondrial outer membrane; lysosome; endoplasmic reticulum; neuron projection; soma; perikaryon; cell body fiber
Biological process	aspartate metabolic process; cellular response to laminar fluid shear stress; urea cycle; positive regulation of nitric oxide biosynthetic process; negative regulation of leukocyte cell-cell adhesion; cellular amino acid biosynthetic process; citrulline metabolic process; argininosuccinate metabolic process; arginine biosynthetic process; kidney development; liver development; acute-phase response; midgut development; ageing; response to nutrient; circadian rhythm; response to toxic substance; response to zinc ion; response to mycotoxin; response to amine; response to estradiol; response to lipopolysaccharide; response to amino acid; response to peptide hormone; response to steroid hormone; response to glucocorticoid; response to growth hormone; diaphragm development; response to fatty acid; cellular response to lipopolysaccharide; cellular response to amino acid stimulus; cellular response to ammonium ion; cellular response to cAMP; cellular response to interferon-gamma; cellular response to tumor necrosis factor; cellular response to glucagon stimulus; cellular response to oleic acid; cellular response to amine stimulus; cellular response to dexamethasone stimulus
Sources:Amigo / QuickGO
Orthologs
Databases	NCBI: entry; OMA: entry
Species	Human	Mouse
Entrez	445	11898
Ensembl	ENSG00000130707	ENSMUSG00000076441
UniProt	P00966	P16460
RefSeq (mRNA)	NM_000050; NM_054012	NM_007494
RefSeq (protein)	NP_000041; NP_446464	NP_031520
Location (UCSC)	Chr 9: 130.44 – 130.5 Mb	Chr 2: 31.36 – 31.41 Mb
PubMed search
- Wikidata
View/Edit Human	View/Edit Mouse

Argininosuccinate synthetase
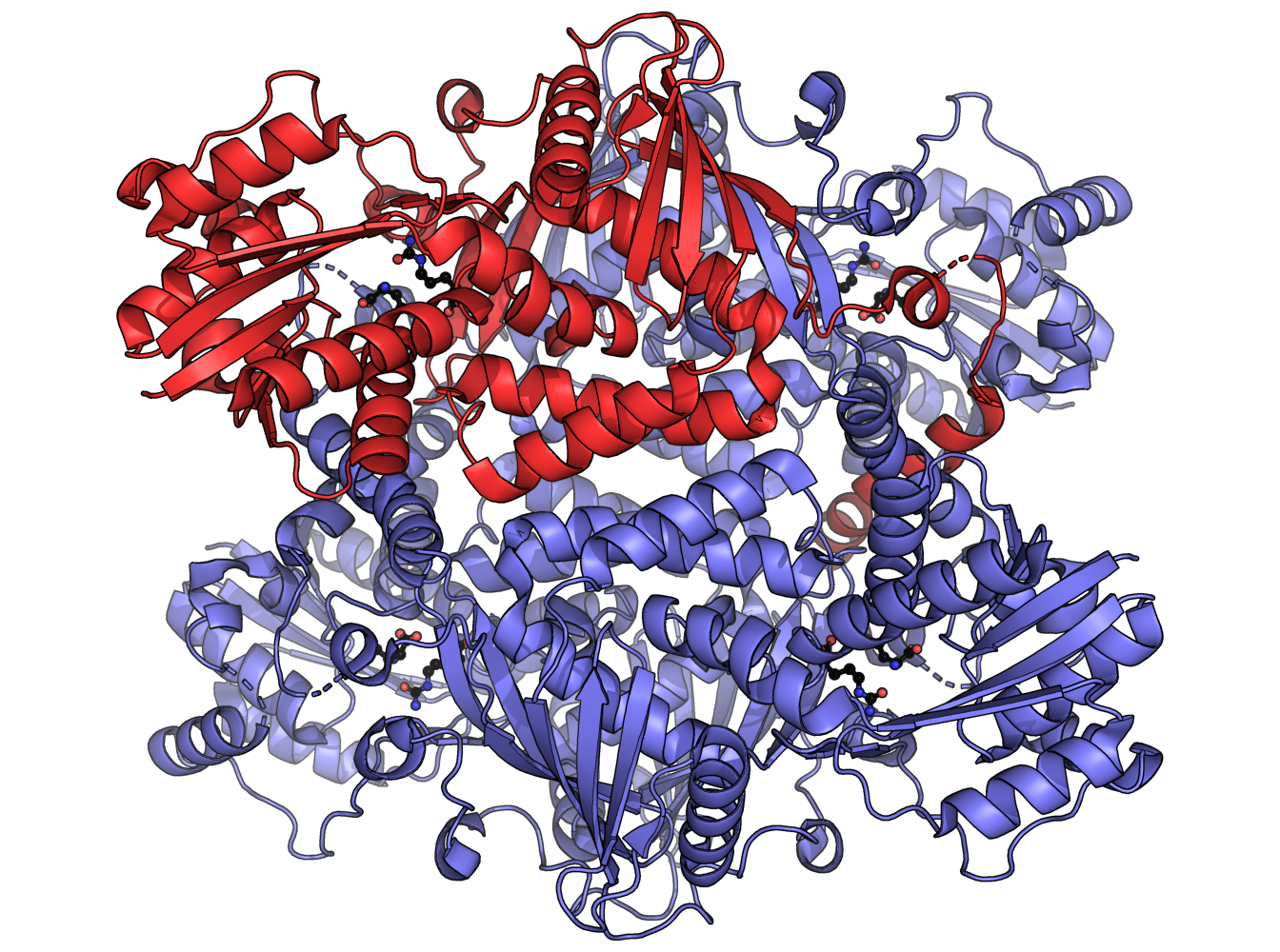
- Human argininosuccinate synthetase tetramer with a protomer highlighted red. PDB: 2NZ2

Identifiers
- EC no.: 6.3.4.5
- CAS no.: 9023-58-9

Databases
- BRENDA: enzyme data
- ExPASy: NiceZyme view
- KEGG: enzyme entry
- MetaCyc: metabolic pathway
- Rhea: reactions
- PDB structures: RCSB PDB PDBe PDBsum
- Gene Ontology: AmiGO / QuickGO
Search
- PMC: articles
- PubMed: articles
- NCBI: proteins

Argininosuccinate synthetase
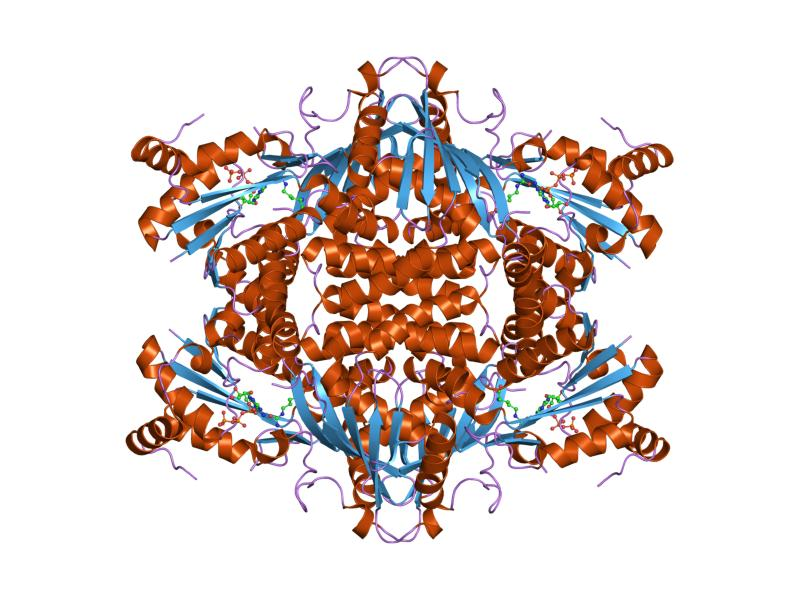
- crystal structure of thermus thermophilus hb8 argininosuccinate synthetase in complex with atp and citrulline

Identifiers
- Symbol: Arginosuc_synth
- Pfam: PF00764
- Pfam clan: CL0039
- InterPro: IPR001518
- PROSITE: PDOC00488
- SCOP2: 1kp2 / SCOPe / SUPFAM
Available protein structures:
- PDB: IPR001518 PF00764 (ECOD; PDBsum)
- AlphaFold: IPR001518; PF00764

Argininosuccinate synthase or synthetase (ASS; EC 6.3.4.5) is an enzyme that catalyzes the synthesis of argininosuccinate from citrulline and aspartate. In humans, argininosuccinate synthase is encoded by the ASS gene located on chromosome 9.

ASS is responsible for the third step of the urea cycle and one of the reactions of the citrulline-NO cycle.

== Expression ==
The expressed ASS gene is at least 65 kb in length, including at least 12 introns. In humans, ASS is expressed mostly in the cells of the liver and kidney.

== Mechanism ==
In the first step of the catalyzed reaction, citrulline attacks the α-phosphate of ATP to form citrulline adenylate, a reactive intermediate. The attachment of AMP to the ureido (urea-like) group on citrulline activates the carbonyl center for subsequent nucleophilic attack. This activation facilitates the second step, in which the α-amino group of aspartate attacks the ureido group. Attack by aspartate is the rate-limiting step of the reaction. This step produces free AMP and L-argininosuccinate.

Thermodynamically, adenylation of the citrulline ureido group is more favorable than the analogous phosphorylation. Additionally, attack by citrulline at the α-phosphate of ATP produces an equivalent of pyrophosphate, which can be hydrolyzed in a thermodynamically favorable reaction to provide additional energy to drive the adenylation.

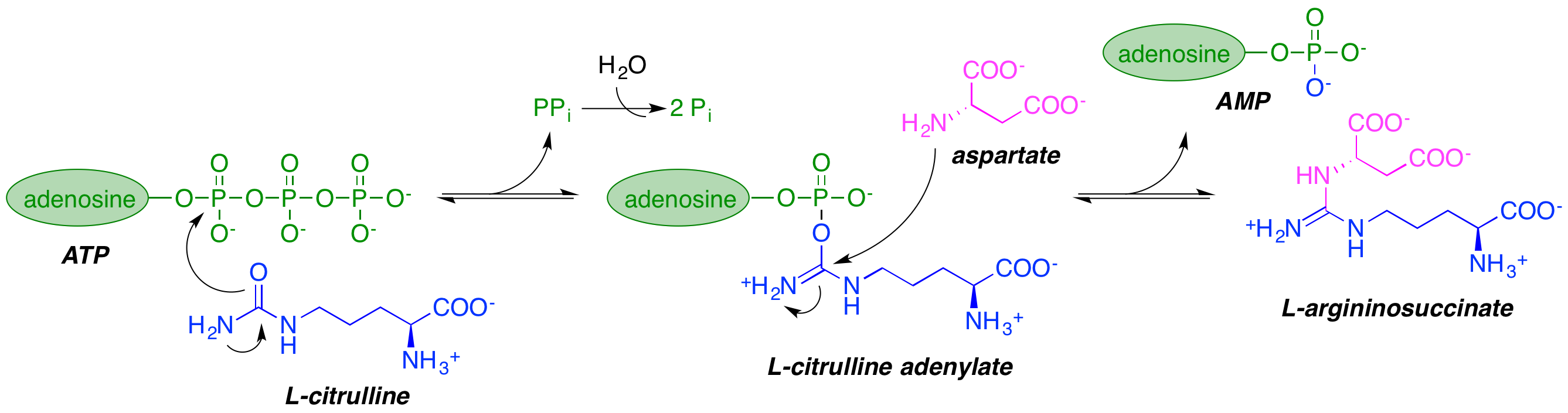
Reaction catalyzed by argininosuccinate synthetase. Adapted from Goto et al. 2003.

== Structure ==
=== Quaternary ===
Argininosuccinate synthetase is a homotetramer, with each subunit consisting of 412 residues. The interfaces between subunits contain a number of salt bridges and hydrogen bonds, and the C-terminus of each subunit is involved in oligomerization by interacting with the C-termini and nucleotide-binding domains of the other subunits.

=== Active site ===
X-ray crystal structures have been generated for argininosuccinate synthetase from Thermus thermophilus, E. coli, Thermotoga maritime, and Homo sapiens. In ASS from T. thermophilus, E. coli, and H. sapiens, citrulline and aspartate are tightly bound in the active site by interactions with serine and arginine residues; interactions of the substrates with other residues in the active site vary by species. In T. thermophilus, the ureido group of citrulline appears to be repositioned during nucleophilic attack to attain sufficient proximity to the α-phosphate of ATP. In E. coli, it is suggested that binding of ATP causes a conformational shift that brings together the nucleotide-binding domain and the synthetase domain. An argininosuccinate synthetase structure with a bound ATP in the active site has not been attained, although modeling suggests that the distance between ATP and the ureido group of citrulline is smaller in human argininosuccinate synthetase than in the E. coli variety, so it is likely that a much smaller conformational change is necessary for catalysis. The ATP binding domain of argininosuccinate synthetase is similar to that of other N-type ATP pyrophosphatases.

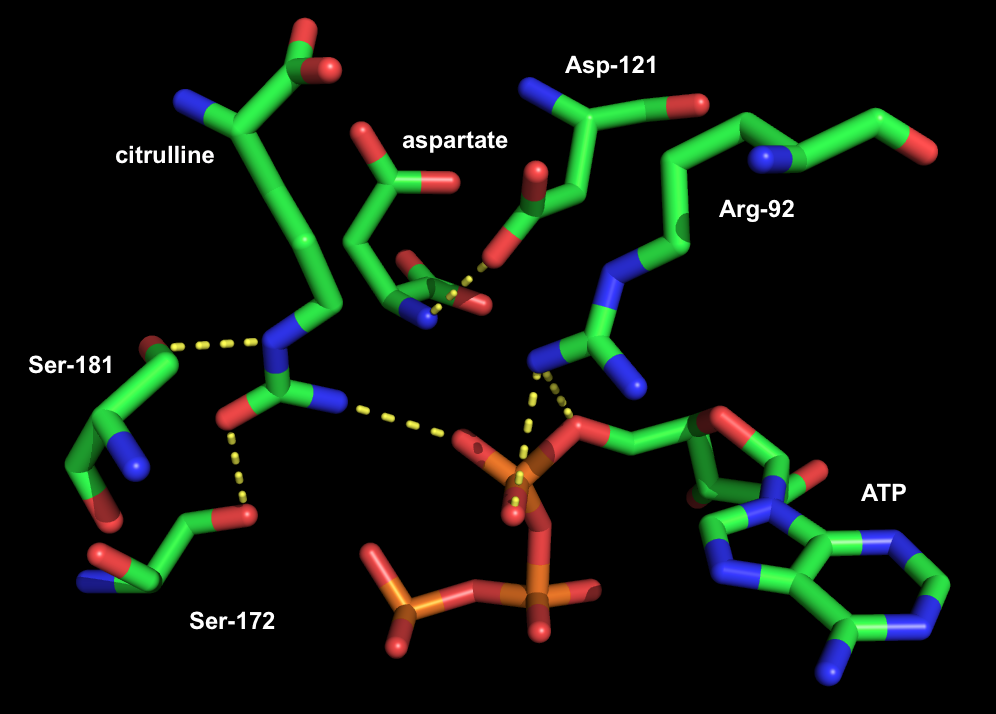
Active site of argininosuccinate synthetase shown with bound citrulline, ATP, and aspartate interacting with select active site residues. Modeled using PyMol from PDB 1J1Z.

== Function ==
Argininosuccinate synthetase is involved in the synthesis of creatine, polyamines, arginine, urea, and nitric oxide.

=== Arginine synthesis ===
The transformation of citrulline into argininosuccinate is the rate-limiting step in arginine synthesis. The activity of argininosuccinate synthetase in arginine synthesis occurs largely in at the outer mitochondrial membrane of periportal liver cells as part of the urea cycle, with some activity occurring in cortical kidney cells.{ Genetic defects that cause incorrect localization of argininosuccinate synthetase to the outer mitochondrial membrane cause type II citrullinemia.

In fetuses and infants, arginine is also produced via argininosuccinate synthetase activity in intestinal cells, presumably to supplement the low level of arginine found in mother's milk. Expression of argininosuccinate synthetase in the intestines ceases after two to three years of life.

It is thought that regulation of argininosuccinate synthetase activity in arginine synthesis occurs primarily at the transcriptional level in response to glucocorticoids, cAMP, glucagon, and insulin. It has also been demonstrated in vitro that arginine down-regulates argininosuccinate synthetase expression, while citrulline up-regulates it.

=== Citrulline-NO cycle ===
The enzyme endothelial nitric oxide synthase produces nitric oxide from arginine in endothelial cells. Argininosuccinate synthetase and argininosuccinate lyase recycle citrulline, a byproduct of nitric oxide production, into arginine. Since nitric oxide is an important signaling molecule, this role of ASS is important to vascular physiology. In this role, argininosuccinate synthetase activity is regulated largely by inflammatory cellular signal molecules such as cytokines.

In endothelial cells, it has been shown that ASS expression is increased by laminar shear stress due to pulsative blood flow. Emerging evidence suggests that ASS may also be subject to regulation by phosphorylation at the Ser-328 residue by protein kinase C-α and by nitrosylation at the Cys-132 residue by nitric oxide synthase.

== Role in disease ==
=== Citrullinemia ===
Citrullinemia is an inherited autosomal recessive disease. At least 50 mutations that cause type I citrullinemia have been identified in the ASS gene. Most of these mutations substitute one amino acid for another in ASS. These mutations likely affect the structure of the enzyme and its ability to bind to citrulline, aspartate, and other molecules. A few mutations lead to the production of an abnormally short enzyme that cannot effectively play its role in the urea cycle.

Defects in ASS disrupt the third step of the urea cycle, preventing the liver from processing excess nitrogen into urea. As a result, nitrogen (in the form of ammonia) and other byproducts of the urea cycle (such as citrulline) build up in the bloodstream. Ammonia is toxic, particularly to the nervous system. An accumulation of ammonia during the first few days of life leads to poor feeding, vomiting, seizures, and the other signs and symptoms of type I citrullinemia.

Treatment for this defect includes a low-protein diet and dietary supplementation with arginine and phenylacetate. Arginine allows the urea cycle to complete itself, creating the substrates needed to originally fix ammonia. This will lower blood pH. Additionally, phenylacetate reacts with backed-up glutamine, resulting on phenylacetoglutamine, which can be excreted renally.

=== Cancer ===
A lack of argininosuccinate synthetase expression has been observed in several types of cancer cells, including pancreatic cancer, liver cancer, and melanoma. For example, defects in ASS have been seen in 87% of pancreatic cancers. Cancer cells are therefore unable to synthesize enough arginine for cellular processes and so must rely on dietary arginine. Depletion of plasma arginine using arginine deiminase has been shown to lead to regression of tumours in mice.

== See also ==
- Citrullinemia
- Urea cycle
- Synthetase
