= Pegargiminase =

Clinical data
- Other names: ADI-PEG20

Identifiers
- CAS Number: 1394129-74-8
- PubChem SID: 194189083
- DrugBank: DB06592
- UNII: 0B7PYQ9YRT
- ChEMBL: ChEMBL3137346

Pegargiminase (also known as pegylated arginine deiminase) is an investigational drug used in arginine deprivation therapy for treating cancers deficient in argininosuccinate synthetase 1 (ASS1). It is a recombinant form of the enzyme arginine deiminase cloned from the bacteria Mycoplasma hominus and synthesized in Escherichia coli. It has been pegylated to improve the half-life and reduce immunogenicity.
