= Nekrep Case =

Court trial due to misdiagnosis in Slovenia

The Nekrep Case was a court trial that followed the death of a 12-year-old boy, Bor Nekrep, due to a misdiagnosis in Slovenia in March 2008. The treating pediatrician misdiagnosed an inborn defect of the urea cycle (a very rare genetic condition). After the boy had been brought by his parents to the Paediatric Clinic in Maribor, the doctor, among other things, measured the level of ammonia in his blood and on the basis of a significantly increased level erroneously diagnosed Reye syndrome. Because of the misdiagnosis and a delay in appropriate treatment, the boy developed cerebral oedema and died eight days later.

== Diagnosis and treatment ==
Before admission to the Maribor paediatric department, the boy was mainly healthy, as confirmed by parents and proved with his school report, except for a "cold". However, he worsened despite taking antibiotics. He was admitted to the emergency department of the Pediatric Clinic in Maribor at 18:00. In an interview published in April 2009, the doctor treating him said that after she had obtained the results of the ordered laboratory tests, among them the level of ammonia, she diagnosed Reye syndrome on the basis of Nelson Textbook of Pediatrics, and began to treat him. In the morning, after a consultation, the doctors there called the colleagues at the University Clinical Centre in Ljubljana and ordered his transport there. The treating physician did not directly communicate with Ljubljana.

The boy's father stated at a press conference in November 2008 that the doctors in Maribor had not discovered the elevation of ammonia. According to him, the next morning they received precise instructions for treatment by the doctors of the University Clinical Centre in Ljubljana, but did not implement them. They transported the boy, who had lost consciousness during the night, to Ljubljana with a "tourist transport". The boy's mother said that upon arrival at the Ljubljana hospital, the doctors there lowered his ammonia level "only with glucose and salt to a harmless level".

As confirmed at the trial in September 2011 by the endocrinologist, who admitted the boy to the endocrinology department in Ljubljana, the boy was unconscious when he arrived. This surprised him, because the Maribor pediatricians told him that his condition had improved. The laboratory tests that he ordered showed a significantly increased level of ammonia. The intern who accompanied the boy during the transport to Ljubljana said that he had already been unconscious in Maribor. The transport took about an hour and a half. The emergency medical service team said that the transport was not urgent and that the transporting van was not equipped for urgent situations. This was also evident from the documentation.

According to the board for professional and ethical issues at the Medical Chamber of Slovenia, the treatment was appropriate until the receipt of the laboratory results showing the increase of the level of ammonia. Due to the misdiagnosis, additional necessary treatment was begun only in the morning. They noted that the boy should have been transferred to Ljubljana immediately upon the receipt of the laboratory results. According to them, the doctor who ordered the transport to Ljubljana refrained from administering glucose due to an already increased level of blood glucose. They also noted that it was not possible to say whether the boy would have survived with appropriate treatment.

== Internal audit and court trial ==
An internal audit was held and the parents sued the doctor. In October 2011, the competent judge found her guilty of negligent treatment. She received a suspended sentence of ten months in prison with a two-year probation. The court established that the correct way of acting would have been to immediately transfer the boy to the endocrinology department of the University Medical Centre in Ljubljana. The Medical Chamber of Slovenia stripped the doctor of her license for four months.

Later, the prosecutor also filed a criminal charge against the president of the internal audit commission for perjury. He claimed that the commission's president had witnessed differently in the criminal investigation than at the trial and that the diagnosis of Reye syndrome did not occur either in the patient's documentation or in the records of the internal audit. The commission's president witnessed at the trial against the doctor that the doctor had mentioned Reye's syndrome to the commission. At the trial, the doctor defended herself with the claim that she did not prescribe the correct therapy because she diagnosed this syndrome. In February 2015, the commission's president was, on the basis of numerous witnesses who all confirmed the president's words, found not guilty. After the prosecutor's appeal, this was reconfirmed by the competent high court in March 2016.
