= Argininosuccinic acid =

Names
- IUPAC name N-[{[(4S)-4-amino-4-carboxybutyl]amino}(imino)methyl]-L-aspartic acid

Identifiers
CAS Number	2387-71-5
3D model (JSmol)	Interactive image
ChemSpider	16059
IUPHAR/BPS	5324
PubChem CID	16950
UNII	T67NZ5MU4H
CompTox Dashboard (EPA)	DTXSID80178574
- InChI: InChI=1S/C10H18N4O6/c11-5(8(17)18)2-1-3-13-10(12)14-6(9(19)20)4-7(15)16/h5-6H,1-4,11H2,(H,15,16)(H,17,18)(H,19,20)(H3,12,13,14)/t5-,6-/m0/s1 Key: KDZOASGQNOPSCU-WDSKDSINSA-N; InChI=1/C10H18N4O6/c11-5(8(17)18)2-1-3-13-10(12)14-6(9(19)20)4-7(15)16/h5-6H,1-4,11H2,(H,15,16)(H,17,18)(H,19,20)(H3,12,13,14)/t5-,6-/m0/s1 Key: KDZOASGQNOPSCU-WDSKDSINBJ
- SMILES: O=C(O)C[C@@H](C(=O)O)NC(=N/CCC[C@H](N)C(=O)O)/N

Properties
Chemical formula	C_{10}H_{18}N_{4}O_{6}
Molar mass	290.27312
- Except where otherwise noted, data are given for materials in their standard state (at 25 °C [77 °F], 100 kPa). verify (what is ?) Infobox references

Argininosuccinic acid is a non-proteinogenic amino acid that is an important intermediate in the urea cycle. It is also known as argininosuccinate.

== Reactions ==
Some cells synthesize argininosuccinic acid from citrulline and aspartic acid and use it as a precursor for arginine in the urea cycle (or citrulline-NO cycle), releasing fumarate as a by-product to enter the TCA cycle. The enzyme that catalyzes the reaction is argininosuccinate synthetase.

Argininosuccinic acid is a precursor to fumarate in the citric acid cycle via argininosuccinate lyase.

== See also ==
- Succinic acid
