= Citrin deficiency =

Monogenetic inherited metabolic disease

- Other names: Citrullinemia Type II, CTLN2, AACD, NICCD
- Specialty: Medical genetics, Inherited Metabolic Disorder, Urea Cycle Disorder, Liver Condition
- Duration: Lifelong
- Causes: Genetic (autosomal recessive)
- Diagnostic method: Newborn Screening, Genetic testing
- Treatment: Diet Management, Medium Chain Triglycerides

Citrin deficiency (CD) is an inherited autosomal recessive metabolic condition and a urea cycle disorder. Citrin deficiency is a complex disorder with several age-dependent phenotypes. A hallmark symptom of citrin deficiency is a strong dietary preference for foods rich in protein and fat, while being low in carbohydrates. Infants affected by citrin deficiency often present with prolonged jaundice and cholestasis. After the first year of life, patients may develop symptoms such as hypoglycemia, failure to thrive (growth impediments), fatigue, dyslipidemia, gastrointestinal discomfort, and fatty liver. If the condition is not well managed, patients may develop more serious complications such as hyperammonemia leading to hepatic encephalopathy that may be fatal. First line treatment is dietary management with a high protein, high fat, and low carbohydrate diet. Supplementing the diet with medium-chain triglyceride (MCT) may also be beneficial for patients. There is currently no cure for citrin deficiency other than liver transplantation if patients do not respond well to treatment.

== Causes ==
Citrin deficiency is caused by genetic mutations in the SLC25A13 gene encoding citrin. Citrin is an aspartate-glutamate carrier protein localized at the inner mitochondrial membrane and is mainly expressed in the liver. It is an important component of the malate-aspartate shuttle that facilitates the transfer of NADH from the cytosol to the mitochondria to maintain redox balance and adenosine triphosphate (ATP) production. Citrin also supplies aspartate to the cytosol (in exchange for glutamate) used in the urea cycle and de novo nucleotide synthesis.

In citrin deficiency, the malate-aspartate shuttle is impaired and leads to an excessive buildup of cytosolic NADH that disrupts multiple metabolic processes such as glycolysis, gluconeogenesis, de novo lipogenesis, beta-oxidation, the tricarboxylic acid (TCA) cycle and the urea cycle. This cumulatively results in a chronic energy deficit in the liver due to affected hepatocytes being unable to efficiently utilize energy sources such as carbohydrates and fatty acids to produce ATP.

One of the hallmarks of citrin deficiency is sweet aversion. It has been proposed that sweet aversion might be due to elevated hepatic expression of FGF21, and in a mouse model of citrin deficiency FGF21 was reported to be over-expressed because of the activation of the ChREBP transcription factor by glycerol-3-phosphate, a newly identified ChREBP-activating ligand. As ChREBP is also a transcriptional activator of de novo lipogenesis, this mechanism could provide an explanation for MASLD, which is very common in citrin deficient patients despite their leanness.

Aralar is an isoform of citrin and possesses similar transport functions. It is encoded by the SLC25A12 gene. Although functionally similar, aralar and citrin have different tissue distributions in humans, with aralar being found primarily in brain, skeletal muscle, kidney, and heart whereas citrin is expressed predominantly in the liver, kidney, and small intestine.

== Clinical phenotypes and associated symptoms ==
Citrin deficiency has three primary phenotypes that are age dependent. They are neonatal intrahepatic cholestasis caused by citrin deficiency (NICCD) that affects infants, followed by the silent/adaptation period or failure to thrive and dyslipidemia caused by citrin deficiency (FTTDCD) during childhood and then, in a small percentage of patients, adolescent and adult citrin deficiency (AACD) (formerly termed CTLN2). AACD represents the most severe form of the condition and is characterized by acute episodes of hyperammonemia, citrullinemia, and psychiatric symptoms. The clinical presentations of citrin deficiency may be heterogenous, with patients exhibiting varying symptoms and severities despite similar demographics and SLC25A13 genetic mutations. Details of the signs and symptoms for each clinical phenotype are shown in Table 1.

In NICCD, frequently observed symptoms are cholestasis, prolonged jaundice, and fatty liver. With the appropriate treatment and management, most symptoms associated with NICCD tend to resolve after 1 year of age.

Post-NICCD, patients enter the silent (or adaptation) phase. While patients appear to be mostly healthy, some patients may have one or more of the following as clinical symptoms: fatty liver, hypoglycemia, fatigue, hyperlipidemia and occasional abdominal pain. A small percentage of patients may develop FTTDCD, with a tendency to show more pronounced symptoms, such as poor growth, hypoglycemia, fatigue, hyperlipidemia, fatty liver, and abdominal pain.

AACD patients typically present with low BMI, citrullinemia, hyperlipidemia, fatigue, fatty liver, and hyperammonemia that may result in neurological symptoms (e.g., nocturnal delirium, disorientation, coma). The onset of AACD can be gradual or sudden and is caused by triggers such as alcohol consumption, long-term overconsumption or binging on foods high in sugar/carbohydrate content, use of contraindicated medication, major surgery, or serious infections. Despite the severity of AACD, not all patients with citrin deficiency will develop AACD if their condition is managed properly.

A hallmark symptom that most citrin deficiency patients develop post-infancy is a strong dietary preference for foods rich in protein and fats and low in carbohydrates. Patients dislike carbohydrate-rich or sweet-tasting foods and will often avoid consuming them. Over-consumption of high carbohydrate and/or sugary foods may cause patients to feel unwell and could lead to metabolic decompensation and hyperammonemia in severe cases.

Table 1. The different phenotypes of citrin deficiency & associated signs & symptoms.
Patient age	Phenotype	Frequent signs & symptoms	Other possible signs & symptoms
Newborn	Neonatal Intrahepatic Cholestasis caused by citrin deficiency (NICCD)	Prolonged jaundice, cholestasis, failure to thrive, fatty liver	Prolonged bleeding time, galactosemia, vitamin K deficiency, hypoproteinemia
>1 year old / Infant to child	Silent or adaptation period	Strong preference for protein/fat-rich foods, aversion to carbohydrate/sugar-rich foods, fatty liver	Hypoglycemia, fatigue, occasional abdominal pain
>1 year old / Infant to child	Failure to thrive and dyslipidemia caused by citrin deficiency (FTTDCD)	Strong preference for protein/fat-rich foods, aversion to carbohydrate/sugar-rich foods, failure to thrive, hypoglycemia, fatigue, abdominal pain, growth impairment, hyperlipidemia	Fatty liver, pancreatitis, hepatoma
Adolescent/adult	Adolescent and adult citrin deficiency (AACD)	Strong food preference for protein/fat-rich foods, aversion to carbohydrate/sugar-rich foods, citrullinemia, hyperammonemia, hyperlipidemia, fatigue, fatty liver	Pancreatitis, hepatoma, low BMI

== Epidemiology ==
Citrin deficiency was originally described in the Japanese population and considered to be primarily an East Asian condition. In recent years, however, patients have been identified across North America and Europe, and the condition is now viewed as a pan-ethnic disease.

In Japan, citrin deficiency has an incidence rate of 1 in 17,000 based on the Japanese carrier rate of 1 in 65. The observed frequency of NICCD cases in Japan is similar to this incidence rate. However, the observed frequency of AACD cases is 1 in 100,000 to 1 in 230,000, which suggests that not all citrin deficiency patients will develop AACD.

Estimated carrier rates have been reported in several Asian countries, as shown below:

- Japan (1:65)
- China (1:45)
- Taiwan (1:57)
- Korea (1:50)
- Singapore (1:41)
- Thailand (1:90)
- Vietnam (1:31)

Based on published carrier rates, there remains a large gap in the number of estimated patients versus the number of reported cases, which emphasizes the significant underdiagnosis of the condition.

== History ==
=== Early clinical recognition and differentiation from classical citrullinemia ===
The first documented cases resembling what is now recognized as citrin deficiency appeared in the 1970s, when Tsujii et al. described two adult siblings in Japan with chronic hepatocerebral symptoms, hyperammonemia, fatty liver, and elevated citrulline levels. The patients also exhibited a dietary aversion to carbohydrates and a preference for protein-rich foods; a unique trait later associated with citrin deficiency. At the time, the disorder was referred to as a "chronic recurrent hepatocerebral disease with hypercitrullinemia" and considered to be a late-onset variant of classical citrullinemia type I, caused by genetic defects in the enzyme argininosuccinate synthetase (ASS).

By the early 1980s, researchers began to propose that citrullinemia may consist of more than one disorder with distinct genetic causes. Saheki et al. observed that some cases in Japan involved a quantitative rather than qualitative deficiency of ASS enzyme, with normal activity observed in extrahepatic tissues such as fibroblasts and kidneys. This observation led to the suggestion of a possible defect in the regulation or expression of ASS enzyme that was limited to the liver, rather than a genetic defect in the ASS gene.

=== Discovery of the SLC25 transporter protein family ===
Around the same period, Nobel laureate John E. Walker, best known for elucidating the mechanisms of ATP production through his seminal studies of ATP synthase, made foundational contributions to the discovery of the mitochondrial carrier family, forming the basis for subsequent work on citrin deficiency. In the 1970s and 1980s, studies led by Walker on mitochondrial carrier proteins led to the identification of the SLC25 family, which comprises transporters located in the inner mitochondrial membrane. Using comparative sequence analysis methods, they demonstrated that these proteins share a common structural signature, characterized by six transmembrane α-helices organized as three related sequences of about 100 amino acids, each containing two hydrophobic helices separated by a relatively extensive sequence of more polar amino acids. This discovery characterized them as a distinct family of mitochondrial transporters with a conserved architecture. Citrin, the protein encoded by SLC25A13, was eventually recognized as a member of this family.

=== Citrin deficiency gene discovery ===
In 1999, Kobayashi and colleagues used positional cloning and homozygosity mapping in DNA samples from affected individuals to identify SLC25A13 as the causative gene in citrin deficiency. Analyses of the protein sequence revealed that citrin protein, encoded by SLC25A13, is a member of the SLC25 mitochondrial carrier protein family defined by Walker's earlier work. Although its precise biochemical function had not yet been determined at the time, this finding linked citrin deficiency to a specific genetic defect involving mitochondrial transporter function.

=== Functional characterization of citrin ===
In 2001, an international collaboration involving the research groups of Takeyori Saheki, Jorgina Satrústegui, Ferdinando Palmieri, and John Walker elucidated the biochemical function of citrin and its paralog aralar. Using the EPRA (expression, purification, reconstitution, and assay) methodology developed by Walker's and Palmieri's groups, they demonstrated that both carrier proteins mediate the exchange of aspartate from the mitochondrial matrix for cytosolic glutamate and a proton. This function is essential for the malate-aspartate shuttle, helping to explain the liver-specific metabolic disturbances observed in citrin deficiency.

=== Expanding the clinical spectrum ===
Although initially described as a condition affecting adults, citrin deficiency was soon recognized as a disorder affecting individuals from infancy through adulthood. Ohura et al. reported the first neonatal cases with cholestasis, abnormal plasma amino acid levels including citrullinemia, and galactosemia, all carrying pathogenic SLC25A13 mutations. This phenotype, now termed neonatal intrahepatic cholestasis caused by citrin deficiency (NICCD), emphasized the need for early detection and neonatal metabolic screening.

Song et al. later identified a post-NICCD phenotype, distinct from both the neonatal and adult forms. These children, though no longer cholestatic, exhibited failure to thrive, dyslipidemia, persistent biochemical anomalies, and sometimes hematologic features. This presentation, termed failure to thrive and dyslipidemia caused by citrin deficiency (FTTDCD), highlighted that some patients, previously thought to be in a clinically silent phase between NICCD and adult-onset, may experience ongoing metabolic disturbances and exhibit symptoms.

=== CTLN2 renaming ===
A 2024 review publication of the clinical landscape of citrin deficiency recommended renaming adult-onset type II citrullinemia (CTLN2) as adolescent and adult citrin deficiency (AACD). The proposed terminology aims to reduce misdiagnosis and prevent confusion with classical citrullinemia (type I), which in some cases has resulted in inappropriate treatment and fatal outcomes.

== Diagnosis ==
The diagnosis of citrin deficiency is based on clinical presentations and biochemical analysis (Table 1). However, genetic analysis for SLC25A13 gene variants remains the gold standard of diagnosis. The following sections detail the specific diagnosis associated with each citrin deficiency phenotype.

=== NICCD ===
Suspected cases may be picked up if newborn screening shows increases in amino acids such as arginine, citrulline, isoleucine + leucine, methionine, and tyrosine. Other clinical presentations such as cholestasis, prolonged jaundice, elevated plasma alpha-fetoprotein, elevated citrulline without significant hyperammonemia, and increased galactose in blood or urine are strongly indicative of NICCD. Elevated serum gamma-glutamyl transferase (GGT, or GTP) may sometimes be observed in NICCD patients as well.

Although listed as a target condition in many NBS programs across Asia, not all NICCD cases are detected at birth, highlighting the need to improve the sensitivity and specificity of current NBS methods. Citrin deficiency is not included as a target condition in many NBS programs in the West, which further compounds the global underdiagnosis of this condition.

=== Silent/adaptation period ===
Without a previous NICCD diagnosis, the diagnosis of patients in the adaptation period may be challenging as most patients appear asymptomatic. However, patients who exhibit a specific dietary preference for foods high in protein and fat while avoiding carbohydrates and sugars may indicate citrin deficiency. Abdominal pain, dyslipidemia, fatty liver, and hypoglycemia may also be indicative of the condition. Recent reports have also shown that silent period patients may exhibit elevated levels of plasma BCAAs and ketogenic amino acids, and low glucogenic amino acids such as glycine.

FTTDCD may be suspected if, in addition to the above symptoms, low BMI, citrullinemia, and high lactate/pyruvate ratios are also observed.

=== AACD ===
Elevated AST, ALT, GGT, arginine, ammonia, and citrulline levels are common biochemical presentations of AACD. Other clinical sympt.oms may include low BMI, hyperlipidemia, fatty liver, and consciousness disturbances caused by hyperammonemia. Combined with a distinct food preference characteristic to citrin deficiency patients, this strongly indicates AACD.

If a patient is admitted with consciousness disturbances and hyperammonemia, doctors should first rule out the possibility of other urea cycle disorders. AACD may be differentiated from ASS deficiency if plasma levels of glutamine are not significantly elevated with an absence of urinary orotic acid and normal or slightly elevated arginine levels.

== Monitoring ==
Patients are advised to attend regular checkups to assess the progression of the condition. Monitoring of the following parameters are recommended:

- Plasma ammonia concentration
- Plasma amino acids
- Liver function tests
- Serum lipid levels
- Anthropometric measurements (for infant and adolescent patients)

An increase in plasma citrulline and serum pancreatic secretory trypsin inhibitor may indicate an onset of AACD, which should prompt medical treatment.

== Management and treatment ==
Except for liver transplantation, there is currently no cure for citrin deficiency. Dietary management with a low carbohydrate, high protein, high fat diet is considered as first-line management for patients. Treatment with MCT has also been reported to improve or resolve some symptoms associated with citrin deficiency by rapidly providing energy to the liver.

All patients should refrain from consuming high-carbohydrate meals or alcohol, as they may trigger metabolic decompensation and may lead to AACD.

The specific management and treatment for each phenotype are detailed below:

=== NICCD ===
Dietary therapy is the mainstay treatment for NICCD. The use of MCT supplemented formula has been reported to improve symptoms associated with NICCD. MCT-enriched formula is frequently prescribed to NICCD patients, and for patients complicated with galactosemia, a lactose-free formula supplemented with MCT is recommended. Restricting lactose has also been reported to improve symptoms associated with NICCD. Fat-soluble vitamins (vitamins A, D, E, K) may sometimes be prescribed to patients.

=== Post-NICCD ===
All citrin deficiency patients post-NICCD are advised to follow a low carbohydrate, high protein and fat diet. Based on clinical reports demonstrating the benefits of MCT supplementation for adolescent and adult patients, it may be advisable for patients to continue taking MCT supplements even after the resolution of clinical symptoms.

=== FTTDCD ===
A combination of dietary management and supplementation with MCT oil may be beneficial for patients with FTTDCD.

=== AACD ===
Dietary management and supplementation with MCT oil is recommended for AACD patients and has been shown to improve or resolve symptoms associated with citrin deficiency.

Ammonia scavengers and arginine may be prescribed to better manage ammonia levels. Patients with brain edema caused by hepatic encephalopathy should avoid glycerol infusions because glycerol is metabolized in the liver to generate NADH, which worsens the condition and may be fatal. Infusions with mannitol to treat brain edema have been reported to be safe. Infusions with high-concentration glucose should also be avoided as it may exacerbate hyperammonemia. In serious cases, where patients do not respond well to treatment, liver transplantation may be required as a final solution and has been shown to correct the metabolic disturbances caused by citrin deficiency.

== Patient organizations ==
Two non-profit organizations are dedicated specifically to supporting individuals and families affected by citrin deficiency.

=== Citrin Foundation ===
The Citrin Foundation is an international nonprofit organization that supports research aimed at improving the understanding and treatment of citrin deficiency. It also provides educational resources and community support for patients and families affected by the condition worldwide.

=== Japan Citrin Deficiency Patient Association ===
The Japan Citrin Deficiency Patient Association is a Japanese patient organization that provides information and peer support for individuals and families affected by citrin deficiency.
