= Miyaura borylation =

Chemical reaction

Named after	Norio Miyaura
Reaction type	Organic redox reaction

Identifiers
Organic Chemistry Portal	miyaura-borylation-reaction

Miyaura borylation, also known as the Miyaura borylation reaction, is a named reaction in organic chemistry that allows for the generation of boronates from vinyl or aryl halides with the cross-coupling of bis(pinacolato)diboron in basic conditions with a catalyst such as PdCl_{2}(dppf). The resulting borylated products can be used as coupling partners for the Suzuki reaction.

== Scope ==
The Miyaura borylation has shown to work for:

Alkyl halides, aryl halides, aryl halides using tetrahydroxydiboron, aryl halides using bis-boronic acid, aryl triflates, aryl mesylates, vinyl halides, vinyl halides of α,β-unsaturated carbonyl compounds, and vinyl triflates.

== See also ==
- Chan-Lam coupling
- Heck reaction
- Hiyama coupling
- Kumada coupling
- Negishi coupling
- Petasis reaction
- Sonogashira coupling
- Stille reaction
- Suzuki reaction
- List of organic reactions
