= Norio Miyaura =

Japanese organic chemist

Norio Miyaura (宮浦憲夫, Miyaura Norio) was a Japanese organic chemist. He was a professor of graduate chemical engineering at Hokkaido University. His major accomplishments surrounded his work in cross-coupling reactions / conjugate addition reactions of organoboronic acids (for C-C bond-forming reactions) and addition / coupling reactions of diborons and boranes (to synthesize organoboronic acids and esters through B-C bond-forming reactions). He is also the co-author of Cross-Coupling Reactions: A Practical Guide with M. Nomura E. S. Miyaura was a world-known and accomplished researcher by the time he retired and so, in 2007, he won the Japan Chemical Society Award.

== Early life and education ==
Norio Miyaura was born in Hokkaido, Japan in 1946. Miyaura received his bachelors in chemical engineering from Hokkaido University in 1969. He next received his masters in chemical engineering from Hokkaido University in 1971. Lastly, he received his doctorate in chemical engineering from Hokkaido University in 1976.

== Career ==
In 1971, Miyaura joined Hokkaido University's Faculty of Engineering as a synthetic chemical engineering assistant. Miyaura joined the J.K.Kochi group at Indiana University as a postdoctoral fellow in 1981. During this time he studied the epoxidation of alkenes catalyzed by metal-salen complexes. Miyaura joined Hokkaido University as a research associate in the A. Suzuki research group and as an associate professor. In 1994, Miyaura became a full professor at the university still working in the A. Suzuki group. In 2010, he retired from Hokkaido University but was allowed to honorarily retain his title as a specially appointed professor.

== Research ==
=== Research interests ===
Miyaura's research interests included metal-catalyzed reactions of organoboron compounds (specifically applications to organic synthesis in catalyzed hydroboration), rhodium- or palladium-catalyzed conjugate addition reactions of arylboronic acids, palladium-catalyzed cross-coupling reactions of organoboronic acids, and addition and coupling reactions of diborons and pinacolborane for the synthesis of organoboronic esters.

=== Suzuki–Miyaura cross-coupling reaction ===
Working with Akira Suzuki (chemist), Miyaura helped to develop the Suzuki reaction which is also known as the Suzuki-Miyaura cross-coupling reaction. In the cross-coupling reaction, the coupling partners are an organohalide and a boronic acid with a palladium(0) complex catalyst. This reaction is used to synthesize polyolefins, styrenes, and substituted biphenyls. In this reaction, a carbon-carbon single bond is formed by coupling a halide (R-X) with an organoboron species (R-B) using a palladium catalyst and a base.

=== Rhodium or palladium-catalyzed conjugate addition reactions of organoboron compounds ===
In 1997, Miyaura created a new catalytic cycle starting from transmetalation which resulted in an aryl- or 1-alkenylrhodium(I) intermediate for 1,4-addition of aryl- or 1-alkenylboronic acids to α,β-unsaturated carbonyl compounds. This reaction turned out to have application in a variety of addition and coupling reactions of organometallic and organo-nonmetallic compounds. In 1998, he discovered the mechanism for a rhodium(I)-catalyzed Grignard-type addition of ArB(OH)_{2} to aldehydes. Then in 2003, Miyaura found a reaction for the 1,4-addition of palladium-catalyzed ArB(OH)_{2}, [ArBF_{3}]K, ArSi(OMe)_{3}, ArSiF_{3} and Ar_{3}Bi to enones. From this he found that the reaction produced a stereogenic center on carbon. He then focused on asymmetric syntheses using chiral rhodium or palladium^{(2+)} catalysts. In 1998, Miyaura created a new chiral ligand of bidentate bisphosphoramidite (Me-BIPAM) through the addition of a rhodium(I)-binap catalyst into an enantioselective 1,4-addition of aryl- and 1-alkenylboronic acids to cyclic and acyclic enones.

=== Borylation reaction of aromatic compounds ===
The Miyaura-Ishiyama borylation reaction is also known as the Miyaura borylation reaction. In this reaction, a catalytic system converts carbon-halogen bonds or carbon-hydrogen bonds into carbon-boron bonds. This reaction can generate boronates from vinyl or aryl halides with the cross-coupling of bis(pinacolato)diboron in basic conditions with a catalyst such as PdCl_{2}(dppf). The reaction results in borylated products that can be used as coupling partners for the Suzuki reaction.

== Awards ==
In 2007, Miyaura was recognized as a recipient of the Japan Chemical Society Award for his achievements in the field of organic chemistry and for his high international reputation. Akira Suzuki (chemist) won the Nobel Prize in 2010 for the Suzuki-Miyaura cross-coupling reaction (Suzuki reaction). Although Miyaura was not personally recognized for this award, pieces of his work from his time in the A. Suzuki group were.
