= Tetrahydroxydiboron =

Names
- IUPAC name Hypoboric acid
- Other names (Dihydroxyboranyl)boronic acid Hypoboric acid Hypodiboric acid Sub-boric acid (Unterborsäure in German); 1,1,2,2-Tetrahydroxydiborane

Identifiers
CAS Number	13675-18-8
3D model (JSmol)	Interactive image
ChEBI	CHEBI:38289
ChemSpider	9161351
ECHA InfoCard	100.222.662
PubChem CID	10986154
UNII	D0Q7FO865W
CompTox Dashboard (EPA)	DTXSID40450702
- InChI: InChI=1S/B2H4O4/c3-1(4)2(5)6/h3-6H Key: SKOWZLGOFVSKLB-UHFFFAOYSA-N
- SMILES: B(B(O)O)(O)O

Properties
Chemical formula	B_{2}H_{4}O_{4}
Molar mass	89.65 g·mol^{−1}
Appearance	White powder
Density	1.657
Solubility in water	very soluble
Solubility	ethanol, DMF, DMSO, DMA

Structure
Crystal structure	monoclinic P21/c

Thermochemistry
Std molar entropy (S^{⦵}_{298})	125.46 J K^{−1} mol^{−1}
Std enthalpy of formation (Δ_{f}H^{⦵}_{298})	−1410.43 kJ mol^{−1}

Hazards
- GHS labelling
Hazard statements	H302, H315, H319, H332, H335
Precautionary statements	P261, P264, P270, P271, P280, P301+P312, P302+P352, P304+P312, P304+P340, P305+P351+P338, P312, P321, P330, P332+P313, P337+P313, P362, P403+P233, P405, P501

Related compounds
Related compounds	Diborane; Diboron tetrafluoride Bis(pinacolato)diboron
- Except where otherwise noted, data are given for materials in their standard state (at 25 °C [77 °F], 100 kPa). Infobox references

Tetrahydroxydiboron is a reagent which has several uses in organic synthesis, notably as a precursor for boronic acids used in Suzuki-Miyaura couplings

== Synthesis ==
The reaction of boron trichloride with alcohols was reported in 1931, and was used to prepare dimethoxyboron chloride, B(OCH_{3})_{2}Cl. Egon Wiberg and Wilhelm Ruschmann used it to prepare tetrahydroxydiboron by first introducing the boron–boron bond by reduction with sodium and then hydrolysing the resulting tetramethoxydiboron, B_{2}(OCH_{3})_{4}, to produce what they termed sub-boric acid. The methanol used in this process can be recycled:

BCl_{3} $\ce{->[\text{+ } \ce{CH3OH}][- \text{ } \ce{HCl}]}$ B(OCH_{3})_{2}Cl $\ce{->[\text{+ } \ce{Na}][- \text{ } \ce{NaCl}]}$ B_{2}(OCH_{3})_{4} $\ce{->[\text{+ } \ce{H2O}][- \text{ } \ce{CH3OH}]}$ B_{2}(OH)_{4}

Overall: 2 BCl_{3} + 2 Na + 4 H_{2}O → B_{2}(OH)_{4} + 2 NaCl + 4 HCl

== Reactions ==
Tetrahydrodiboron can be used in the Miyaura borylation of aryl halides and pseudo-halides to form aryl boronic acids, which are key components in Suzuki-Miyaura couplings. Tetrahydroxydiboron has also been shown to be a reducing agent for nitro groups, providing an alternative to reactions involving hydrogen gas.

== Safety ==
Although tetrahydroxydiboron has been shown not to be shock or friction sensitive in the solid state, differential scanning calorimetry shows the compound decomposes with significant energy release starting at 90 °C, which may be related to the dehydration to a polymeric boron(II) oxide. Similar thermal instability is observed in solution with organic solvents like DMF and DMSO. An additional safety consideration when using tetrahydroxydiboron is that upon exposure to water, tetrahydroxydiboron decomposes to form for two equivalents of boric acid and one equivalent of hydrogen gas.
