= Organotrifluoroborate =

Class of chemical compounds

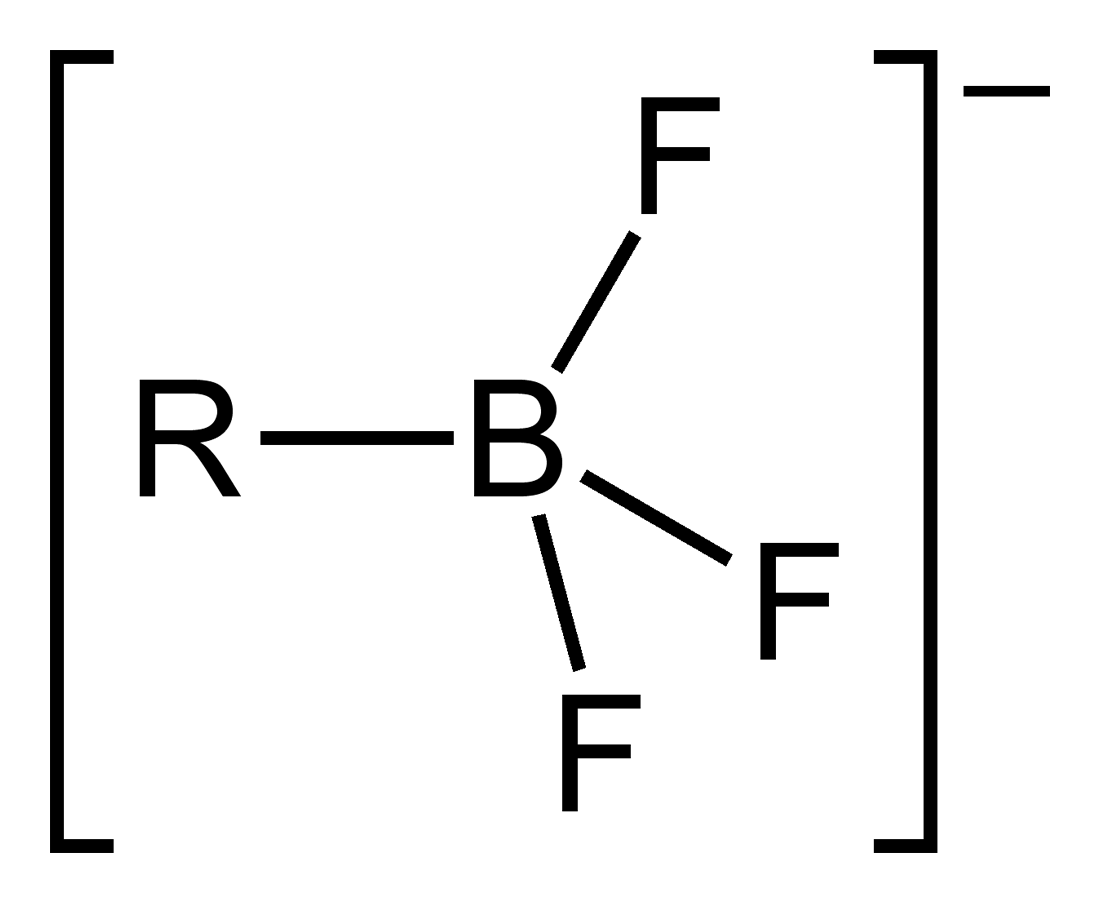
General structural formula of an organotrifluoroborate anion

Organotrifluoroborates are organoboron compounds that contain an anion with the general formula [RBF_{3}]^{−}. They can be thought of as protected boronic acids, or as adducts of carbanions and boron trifluoride. Organotrifluoroborates are tolerant of air and moisture and are easy to handle and purify. They are often used in organic synthesis as alternatives to boronic acids (RB(OH)_{2}), boronate esters (RB(OR′)_{2}), and organoboranes (R_{3}B), particularly for Suzuki-Miyaura coupling.

== Structure ==
| thermal ellipsoid model of [PhBF_{3}]^{−}, as found in the crystal structure of K[PhBF_{3}] | space-filling packing diagram of the crystal structure of K[PhBF_{3}] |

== Synthesis ==
Boronic acids RB(OH)_{2} react with potassium bifluoride K[HF_{2}] to form trifluoroborate salts K[RBF_{3}].

== Reactivity ==
Organotrifluoroborates are strong nucleophiles and react with electrophiles without transition-metal catalysts.

== Mechanism ==
The mechanism of organotrifluoroborate-based Suzuki-Miyaura coupling reactions has recently been investigated in detail. The organotrifluoroborate hydrolyses to the corresponding boronic acid in situ, so a boronic acid can be used in place of an organotrifluoroborate, as long as it is added slowly and carefully.
