= Suzuki reaction =

Cross-coupling reaction between boronic acid & an organohalide

Named after	Akira Suzuki
Reaction type	Coupling reaction

Identifiers
Organic Chemistry Portal	suzuki-coupling
RSC ontology ID	RXNO:0000140

The Suzuki reaction or Suzuki coupling is an organic reaction that uses a palladium complex catalyst to cross-couple a boronic acid to an organohalide. It was first published in 1979 by Akira Suzuki, and he shared the 2010 Nobel Prize in Chemistry with Richard F. Heck and Ei-ichi Negishi for their contribution to the discovery and development of noble metal catalysis in organic synthesis. This reaction is sometimes telescoped with the related Miyaura borylation; the combination is the Suzuki–Miyaura reaction. It is widely used to synthesize polyolefins, styrenes, and substituted biphenyls.

The general scheme for the Suzuki reaction forms a carbon–carbon single bond by coupling a halide (R^{1}-X) with an organoboron species (R^{2}-BY_{2}) using a palladium catalyst and a base. The organoboron species is usually synthesized by hydroboration or carboboration, allowing for rapid generation of molecular complexity:

$\begin{array}{c} \\ {\color{Red}\ce{R^1}}\ce{-X} + {\color{Blue}\ce{R^2-BY2}} \ \ce{->[\text{[Pd] cat., base}]}\ {\color{Red}\ce{R^1}}\ce{-}{\color{Blue}\ce{R^2}} \\ \end{array}$
General scheme of Suzuki reaction

Several reviews have been published describing advancements and the development of the Suzuki reaction.

== Reaction mechanism ==
The mechanism of the Suzuki reaction is best viewed from the perspective of the palladium catalyst. The catalytic cycle is initiated by the formation of an active Pd^{0} catalytic species, A. This participates in the oxidative addition of palladium to the halide reagent 1 to form the organopalladium intermediate B. Reaction (metathesis) with base gives intermediate C, which via transmetalation with the boron-ate complex D (produced by reaction of the boronic acid reagent 2 with base) forms the transient organopalladium species E. Reductive elimination step leads to the formation of the desired product 3 and restores the original palladium catalyst A which completes the catalytic cycle.

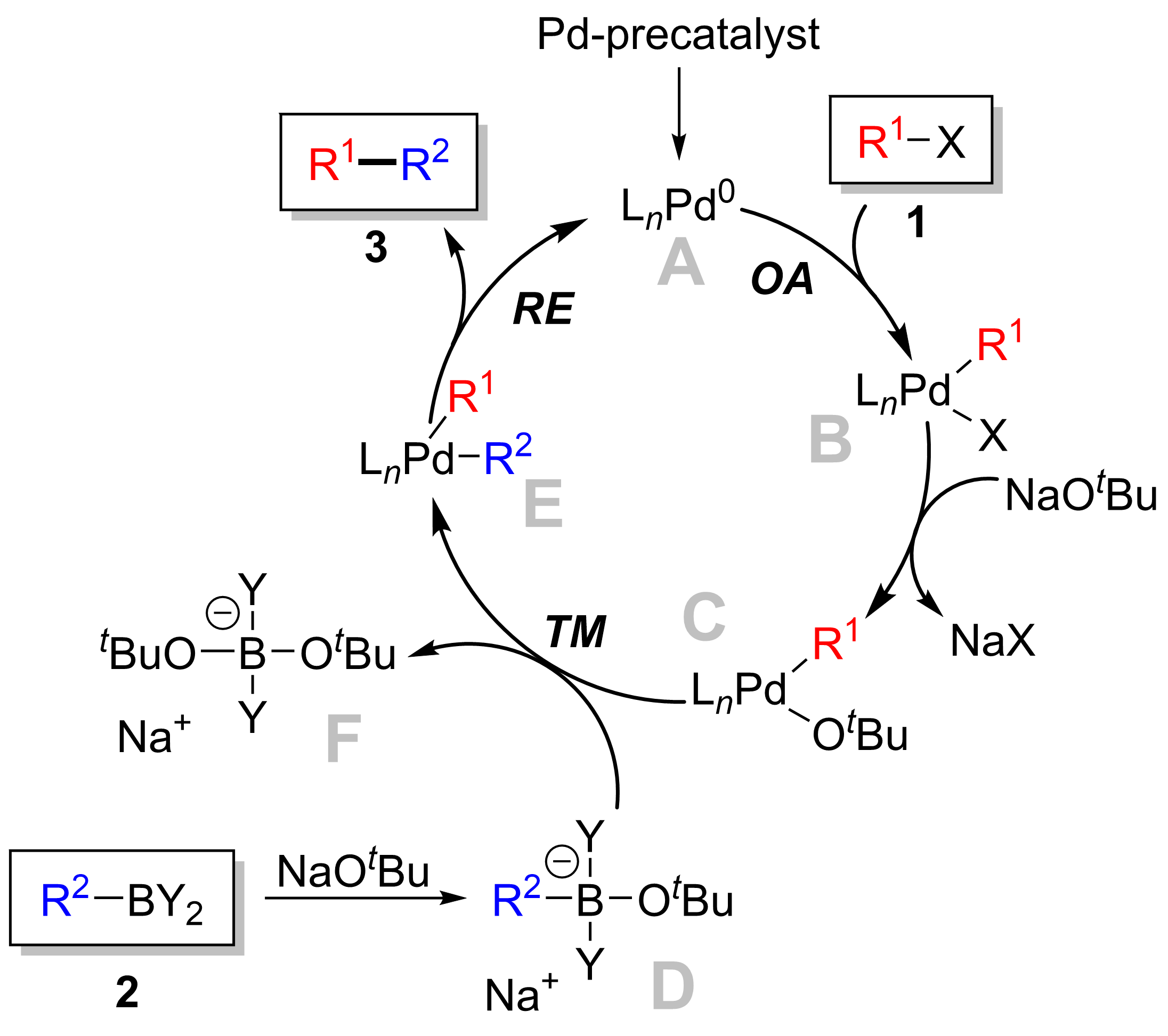

The Suzuki coupling takes place in the presence of a base and for a long time the role of the base was not fully understood. The base was first believed to form a trialkyl borate (R_{3}B-OR), in the case of a reaction of a trialkylborane (BR_{3}) and alkoxide (^{−}OR); this species could be considered as being more nucleophilic and then more reactive towards the palladium complex present in the transmetalation step. Amatore and coworkers investigated the role of the base in the reaction mechanism for the Suzuki coupling and they found that the base has three roles: Formation of the palladium complex [ArPd(OR)L_{2}], formation of the trialkyl borate and the acceleration of the reductive elimination step by reaction of the alkoxide with the palladium complex.

=== Oxidative addition ===
In most cases the oxidative addition is the rate determining step of the catalytic cycle. During this step, the palladium catalyst is oxidized from palladium(0) to palladium(II). The catalytically active palladium species A is coupled with the aryl halide substrate 1 to yield an organopalladium complex B. As seen in the diagram below, the oxidative addition step breaks the carbon-halogen bond where the palladium is now bound to both the halogen (X) as well as the R^{1} group.

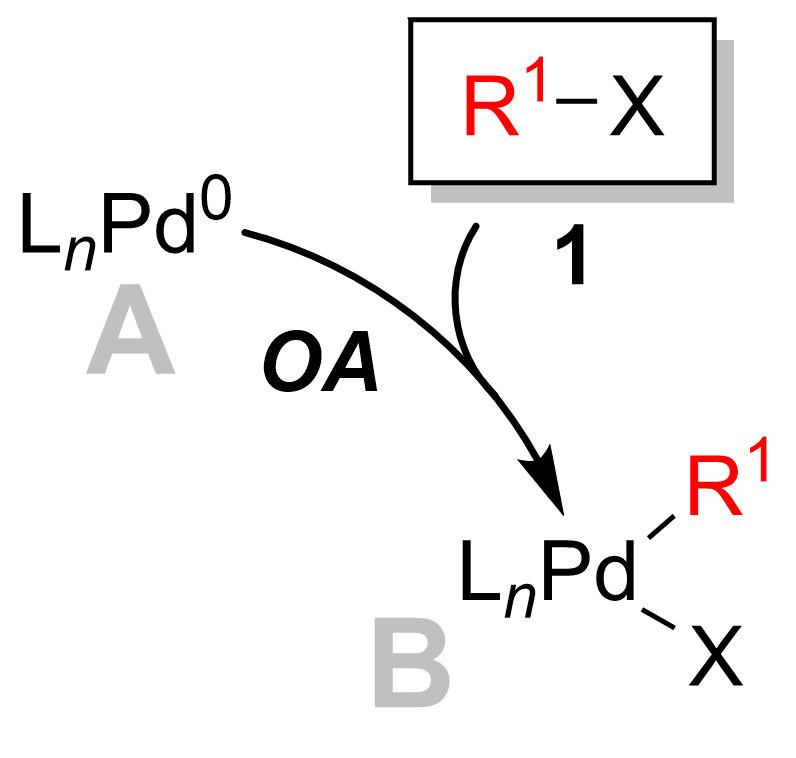
Oxidative addition step in Suzuki coupling.

Oxidative addition proceeds with retention of stereochemistry with vinyl halides, while giving inversion of stereochemistry with allylic and benzylic halides. The oxidative addition initially forms the cis–palladium complex, which rapidly isomerizes to the trans-complex.

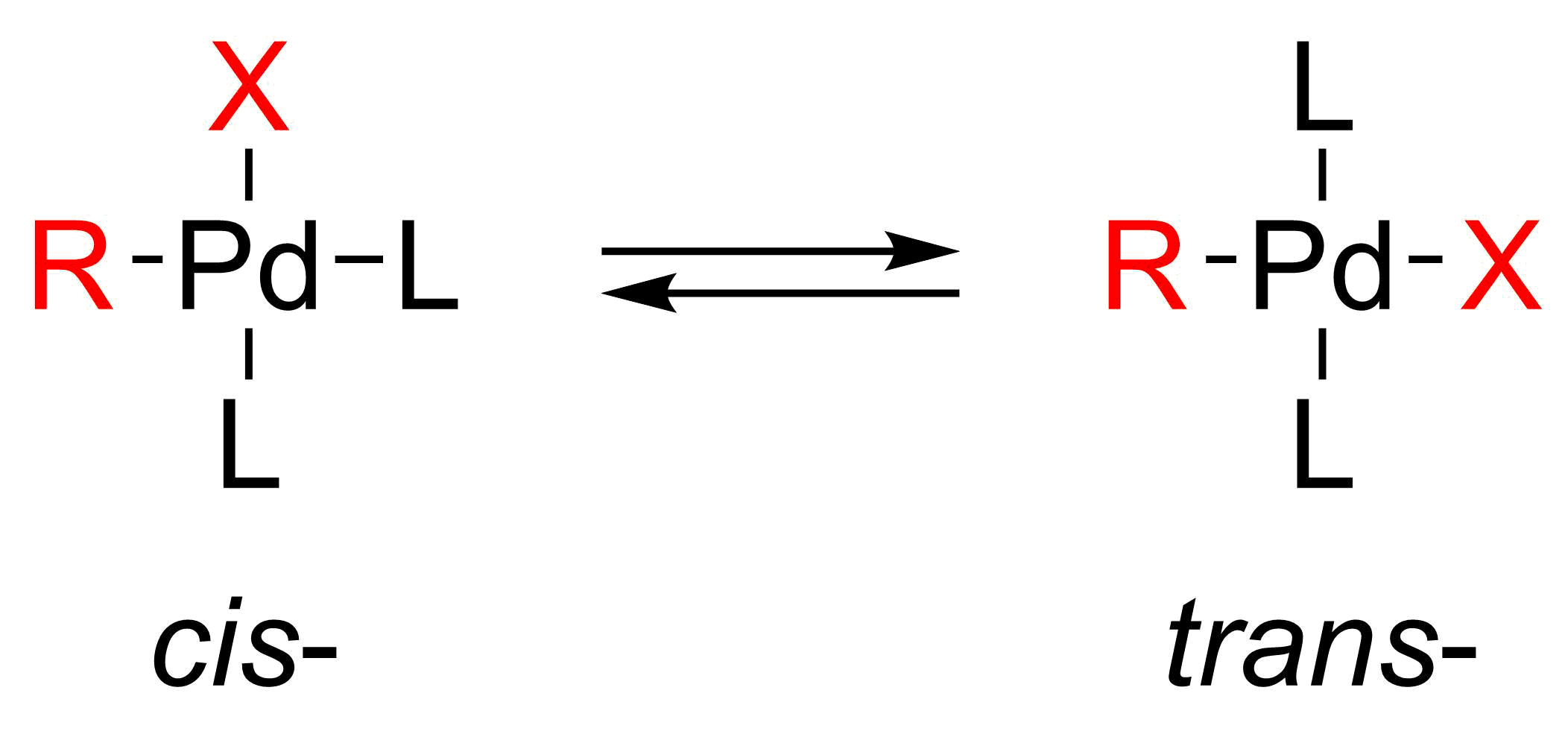
Cis-trans isomerization of Pd oxidative addition product

The Suzuki coupling occurs with retention of configuration on the double bonds for both the organoboron reagent or the halide. However, the configuration of that double bond, cis or trans is determined by the cis-to-trans isomerization of the palladium complex in the oxidative addition step where the trans palladium complex is the predominant form. When the organoboron is attached to a double bond and it is coupled to an alkenyl halide the product is a diene as shown below.

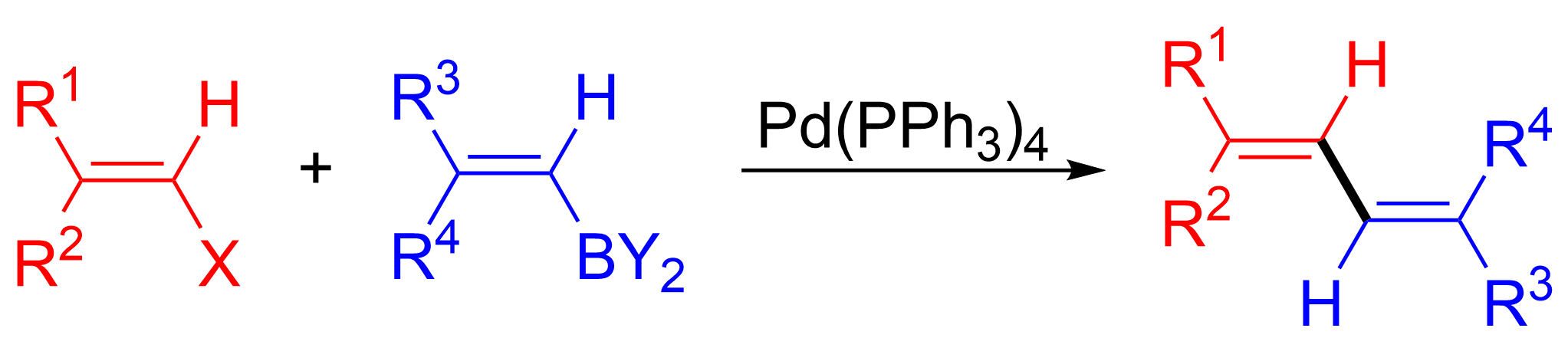

=== Transmetalation ===
Transmetalation is an organometallic reaction where ligands are transferred from one species to another. In the case of the Suzuki coupling the ligands are transferred from the organoboron species D to the palladium(II) complex C where the base that was added in the prior step is exchanged with the R_{2} substituent on the organoboron species to give the new palladium(II) complex E. The exact mechanism of transmetalation for the Suzuki coupling remains to be discovered. The organoboron compounds do not undergo transmetalation in the absence of base and it is therefore widely believed that the role of the base is to activate the organoboron compound as well as facilitate the formation of R^{1}-Pd^{ll}-O^{t}Bu intermediate (C) from oxidative addition product R^{1}-Pd^{ll}-X (B).

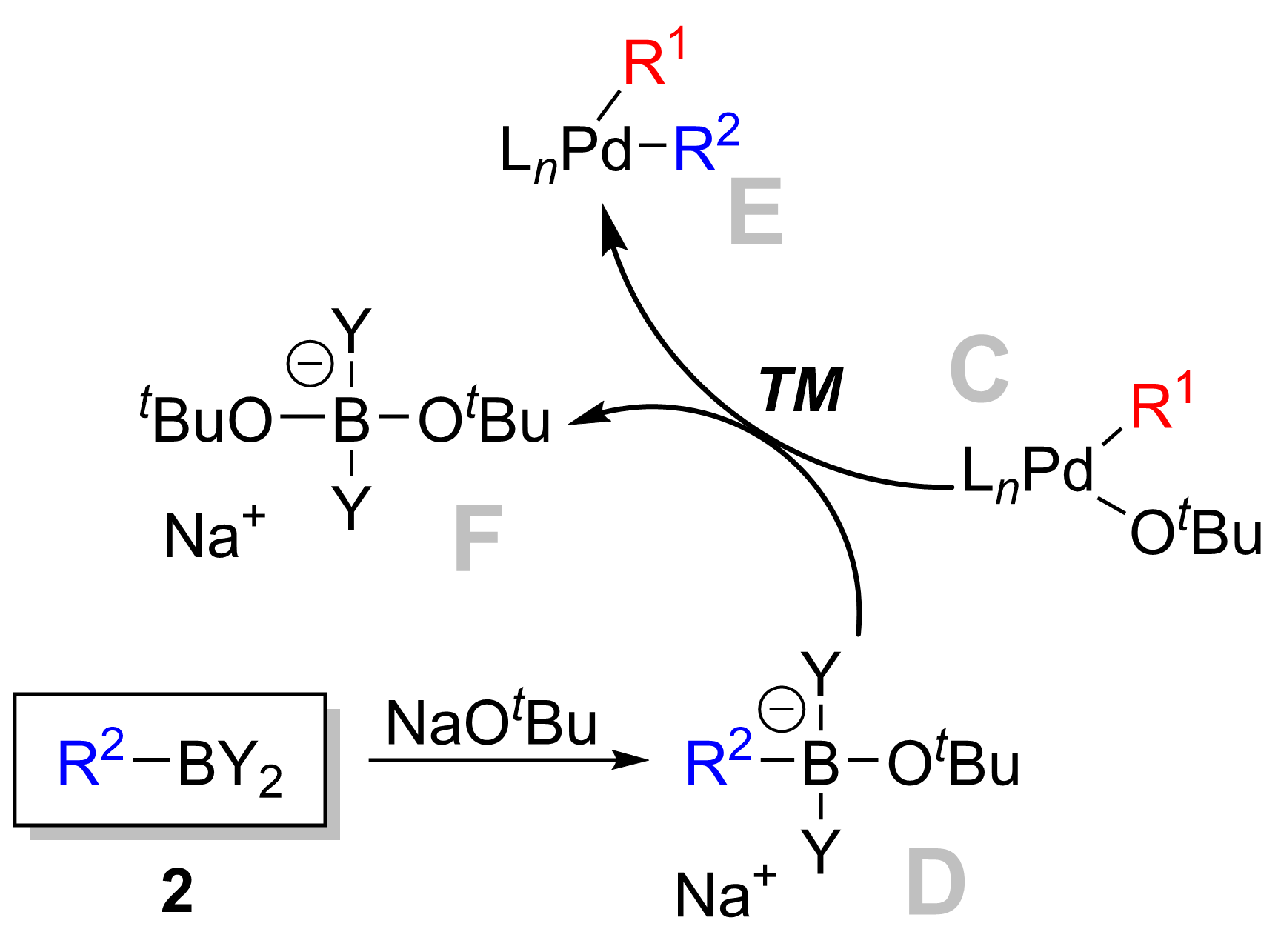
Transmetallation in Suzuki reaction.

=== Reductive elimination ===
The final step is the reductive elimination step where the palladium(II) complex (E) eliminates the product (3) and regenerates the palladium(0) catalyst (A). Using deuterium labelling, Ridgway et al. have shown the reductive elimination proceeds with retention of stereochemistry.

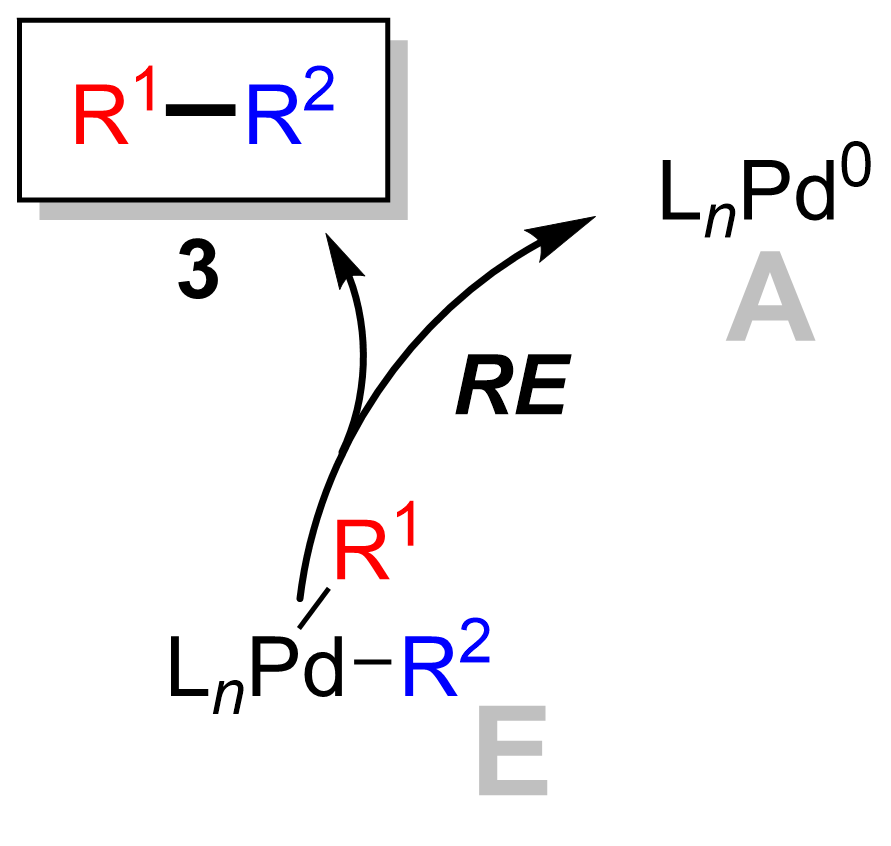
Reductive elimination step in the catalytic cycle of Suzuki reaction.

The ligand plays an important role in the Suzuki reaction. Typically, the phosphine ligand is used in the Suzuki reaction. Phosphine ligand increases the electron density at the metal center of the complex and therefore helps in the oxidative addition step. In addition, the bulkiness of substitution of the phosphine ligand helps in the reductive elimination step. However, N-heterocyclic carbene ligands have recently been used in this cross coupling, due to the instability of the phosphine ligand under Suzuki reaction conditions. N-Heterocyclic carbenes are more electron rich and bulky than the phosphine ligand. Therefore, both the steric and electronic factors of the N-heterocyclic carbene ligand help to stabilize active Pd(0) catalyst.

== Advantages ==
The advantages of Suzuki coupling over other similar reactions include availability of common boronic acids, mild reaction conditions, and its less toxic nature. Boronic acids are less toxic and safer for the environment than organotin and organozinc compounds. It is easy to remove the inorganic by-products from the reaction mixture. Further, this reaction is preferable because it uses relatively cheap and easily prepared reagents. Being able to use water as a solvent makes this reaction more economical, eco-friendly, and practical to use with a variety of water-soluble reagents. A wide variety of reagents can be used for the Suzuki coupling, e.g., aryl or vinyl boronic acids and aryl or vinyl halides. Work has also extended the scope of the reaction to incorporate alkyl bromides. In addition to many different type of halides being possible for the Suzuki coupling reaction, the reaction also works with pseudohalides such as triflates (OTf), as replacements for halides. The relative reactivity for the coupling partner with the halide or pseudohalide is: R_{2}–I > R_{2}–OTf > R_{2}–Br ≫ R_{2}–Cl. Boronic esters and organotrifluoroborate salts may be used instead of boronic acids. The catalyst can also be a palladium nanomaterial-based catalyst. With a novel organophosphine ligand (SPhos), a catalyst loading of down to 0.001 mol% has been reported. These advances and the overall flexibility of the process have made the Suzuki coupling widely accepted for chemical synthesis.

== Applications ==
=== Industrial applications ===
The Suzuki coupling reaction is scalable and cost-effective for use in the synthesis of intermediates for pharmaceuticals or fine chemicals. The Suzuki reaction was once limited by high levels of catalyst and the limited availability of boronic acids. Replacements for halides were also found, increasing the number of coupling partners for the halide or pseudohalide as well. Scaled up reactions have been carried out in the synthesis of a number of important biological compounds such as CI-1034 which used triflate and boronic acid coupling partners which was run on an 80 kilogram scale with a 95% yield.

Another example is the coupling of 3-pyridylborane and 1-bromo-3-(methylsulfonyl)benzene that formed an intermediate that was used in the synthesis of a potential central nervous system agent. The coupling reaction to form the intermediate produced 278 kilograms in a 92.5% yield.

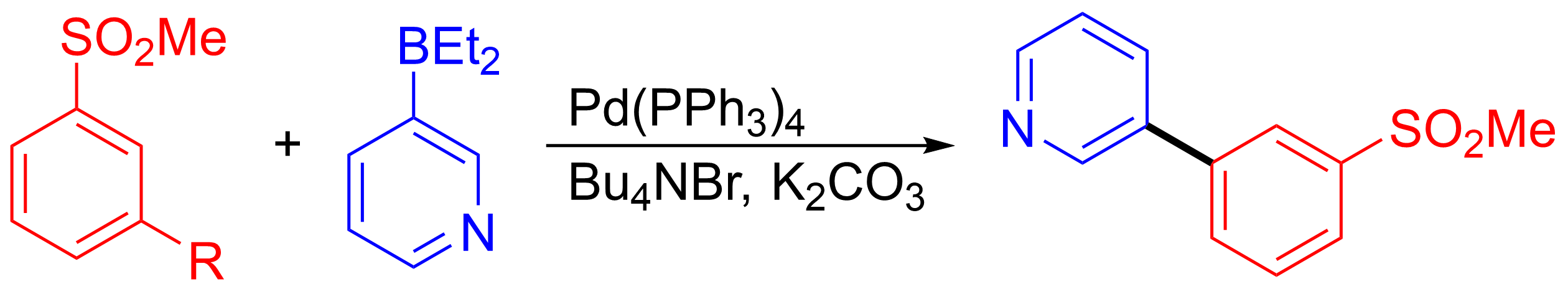

Significant efforts have been put into the development of heterogeneous catalysts for the Suzuki CC reaction, motivated by the performance gains in the industrial process (eliminating the catalyst separation from the substrate), and recently a Pd single atom heterogeneous catalyst has been shown to outperform the industry default homogeneous Pd(PPh_{3})_{4} catalyst.

=== Synthetic applications ===
The Suzuki coupling has been frequently used in syntheses of complex compounds. The Suzuki coupling has been used on a citronellal derivative for the synthesis of caparratriene, a natural product that is highly active against leukemia:

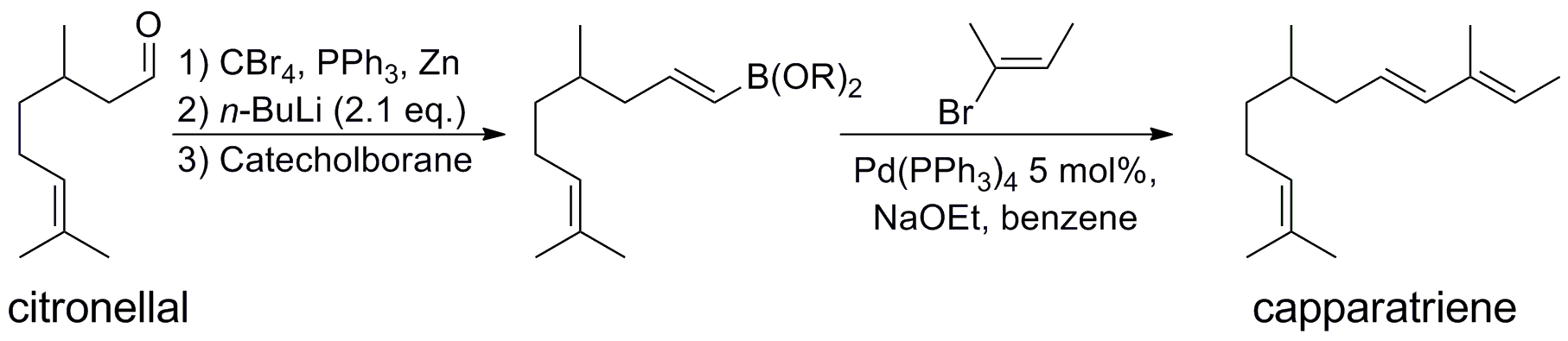

== Variations ==
=== Metal catalyst ===
Various catalytic uses of metals other than palladium (especially nickel) have been developed. The first nickel catalyzed cross-coupling reaction was reported by Percec and co-workers in 1995 using aryl mesylates and boronic acids. Even though a higher amount of nickel catalyst was needed for the reaction, around 5 mol %, nickel is not as expensive or as precious a metal as palladium. The nickel catalyzed Suzuki coupling reaction also allowed a number of compounds that did not work or worked worse for the palladium catalyzed system than the nickel-catalyzed system. The use of nickel catalysts has allowed for electrophiles that proved challenging for the original Suzuki coupling using palladium, including substrates such as phenols, aryl ethers, esters, phosphates, and fluorides.

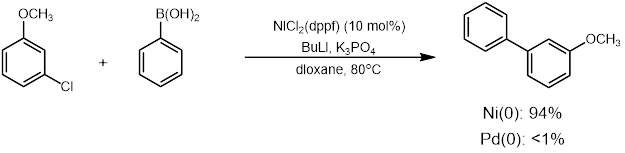
Nickel Suzuki 1

Investigation into the nickel catalyzed cross-coupling continued and increased the scope of the reaction after these first examples were shown and the research interest grew. Miyaura and Inada reported in 2000 that a cheaper nickel catalyst could be utilized for the cross-coupling, using triphenylphosphine (PPh_{3}) instead of the more expensive ligands previously used. However, the nickel-catalyzed cross-coupling still required high catalyst loadings (3-10%), required excess ligand (1-5 equivalents) and remained sensitive to air and moisture. Advancements by Han and co-workers have tried to address that problem by developing a method using low amounts of nickel catalyst (<1 mol%) and no additional equivalents of ligand.

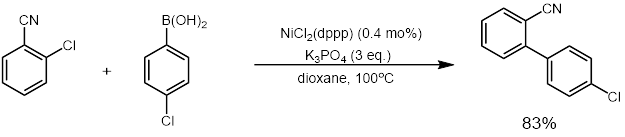
Nickel Suzuki 2

It was also reported by Wu and co-workers in 2011 that a highly active nickel catalyst for the cross-coupling of aryl chlorides could be used that only required 0.01-0.1 mol% of nickel catalyst. They also showed that the catalyst could be recycled up to six times with virtually no loss in catalytic activity. The catalyst was recyclable because it was a phosphine nickel nanoparticle catalyst (G_{3}DenP-Ni) that was made from dendrimers.

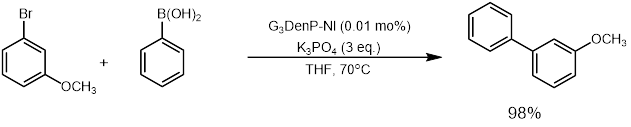
Nickel Suzuki 3

Advantages and disadvantages apply to both the palladium and nickel-catalyzed Suzuki coupling reactions. Apart from Pd and Ni catalyst system, cheap and non-toxic metal sources like iron and copper have been used in Suzuki coupling reaction. The Bedford research group and the Nakamura research group have extensively worked on developing the methodology of iron catalyzed Suzuki coupling reaction. Ruthenium is another metal source that has been used in Suzuki coupling reaction.

=== Amide coupling ===
Nickel catalysis can construct C-C bonds from amides. Despite the inherently inert nature of amides as synthons, the following methodology can be used to prepare C-C bonds. The coupling procedure is mild and tolerant of myriad functional groups, including: amines, ketones, heterocycles, groups with acidic protons. This technique can also be used to prepare bioactive molecules and to unite heterocycles in controlled ways through shrewd sequential cross-couplings. A general review of the reaction scheme is given below.

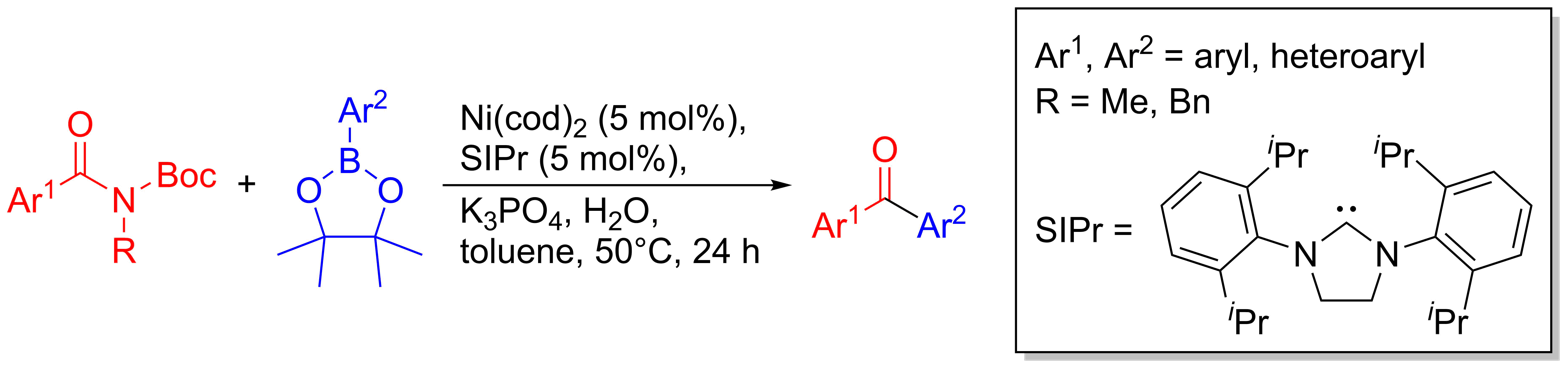

The synthesis of a tubulin-binding compound (antiproliferative agent) was carried out using a trimethoxybenzamide and an indolyl pinacolatoboron coupling partner on a gram scale.

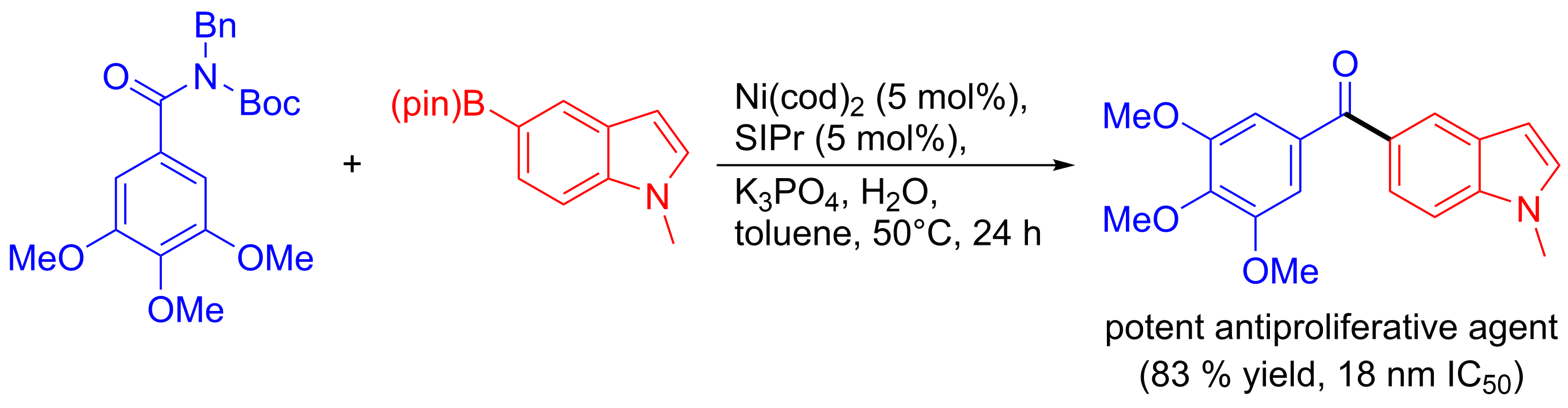

=== Organoboranes ===
Aryl boronic acids are comparatively cheaper than other organoboranes and a wide variety of aryl boronic acids are commercially available. Hence, it has been widely used in Suzuki reaction as an organoborane partner. Aryltrifluoroborate salts are another class of organoboranes that are frequently used because they are less prone to protodeboronation compared to aryl boronic acids. They are easy to synthesize and can be easily purified. Aryltrifluoroborate salts can be formed from boronic acids by the treatment with potassium hydrogen fluoride which can then be used in the Suzuki coupling reaction.

1. Aryltrifluoroborate synthesis:
  $${\color{Blue}\ce{R-B(OH)2} } \ \ce{->[{} \atop \ce{KHF2}]} \ {\color{Blue}\ce{R-BF3^-K+} }$$
2. Aryltrifluoroborates in Suzuki reaction:
  $${\color{Red}\ce{Ar-Br} } + {\color{Blue}\ce{R-BF3K} } \ \ce{->[{} \atop \text{[Pd] cat., base}]} \ {\color{Red}\ce{Ar} }\ce{-}{\color{Blue}\ce{R} }$$

=== Solvent variations ===
The Suzuki coupling reaction is different from other coupling reactions in that it can be run in biphasic organic-water, water-only, or no solvent. This increased the scope of coupling reactions, as a variety of water-soluble bases, catalyst systems, and reagents could be used without concern over their solubility in organic solvent. Use of water as a solvent system is also attractive because of the economic and safety advantages. Frequently used in solvent systems for Suzuki coupling are toluene, THF, dioxane, and DMF. The most frequently used bases are K_{2}CO_{3}, KOtBu, Cs_{2}CO_{3}, K_{3}PO_{4}, NaOH, and NEt_{3}.

== See also ==
- Chan-Lam coupling
- Heck reaction
- Hiyama coupling
- Kumada coupling
- Negishi coupling
- Petasis reaction
- Sonogashira coupling
- Stille reaction
- List of organic reactions
