= ALDH18A1 =

Protein-coding gene in the species Homo sapiens

An Error has occurred retrieving Wikidata item for infobox Delta-1-pyrroline-5-carboxylate synthetase (P5CS) is an enzyme that in humans is encoded by the ALDH18A1 gene. This gene is a member of the aldehyde dehydrogenase family and encodes a bifunctional ATP- and NADPH-dependent mitochondrial enzyme with both gamma-glutamyl kinase and gamma-glutamyl phosphate reductase activities. The encoded protein catalyzes the reduction of glutamate to delta1-pyrroline-5-carboxylate, a critical step in the de novo biosynthesis of proline, ornithine and arginine. Mutations in this gene lead to hyperammonemia, hypoornithinemia, hypocitrullinemia, hypoargininemia and hypoprolinemia and may be associated with neurodegeneration, cataracts and connective tissue diseases. Alternatively spliced transcript variants, encoding different isoforms, have been described for this gene. As reported by Bruno Reversade and colleagues, ALDH18A1 deficiency or dominant-negative mutations in P5CS in humans causes a progeroid disease known as De Barsy Syndrome.

== Structure ==
P5CS consists of two domains: gamma-glutamyl kinase and gamma-glutamyl phosphate reductase, each of which are used to complete the two steps to create ornithine and proline. The gamma-glutamyl kinase domain employs a 367-residue chain that folds into an N-terminal amino acid kinase domain, responsible for catalysis and proline inhibition, and a C-terminal PUA RNA binding domain. This enzyme is also a tetramer formed by two dimers, and the monomers and dimers are assembled in a manner that allows the amino acid kinase active pockets to be alternatively oriented in the tetramer. The short version (P5CS.short) and the long version (P5CS.long) of PC5S are two isoforms of this enzyme which differs by the addition of two amino acids in the long form and with an extra 6-bp insert following bp+711. This slight difference creates a dramatic difference in how they are affected by the inhibition of ornithine. The ALDH18A1 gene spans 15 kb, is mapped on 10q24.3, and has an exon count of 18.

== Function ==
P5CS catalyzes the phosphorylation and reduction of glutamate to Δ1-pyrroline-5-carboxylate (P5C). This occurs through two independent steps where first the γ-carboxylate of a glutamate is phosphorylated in the γ-glutamyl kinase domain and second is reduced to γ-glutamic semi-aldehyde in the reductase domain. The γ-glutamic semi-aldehyde cyclizes to the tautomeric P5C. γ-glutamic semi-aldehyde may also be converted to ornithine. P5CS has two isoforms: PC5S.short and PC5S.long, where the short version has high activity in the gut, participating in arginine biosynthesis, and the long version is present in various other tissues and primarily synthesizes proline from glutamate. PC5S.short is inhibited by ornithine, whereas PC5S.long is unaffected.

== Evolution ==
The distinct domains of eukaryotic P5CS are in prokaryotes and unicellular eukaryotes present in two separate enzymes, proA (gamma-glutamyl phosphate reductase) and proB (gamma-glutamyl kinase). The sequence and structural data of both ancestral enzymes suggest that proA and proB genes originate from a single gene duplication and subsequent subfunctionalization. The fusion of proA and proB was likely preceded by a deletion of PUA domain in proB, reducing the sensitivity to proline feedback inhibition and enabling the observed channeling of gamma-glutamyl phosphate intermediate.

== Clinical significance ==
Ornithine and/or arginine are key intermediates for the synthesis of urea, creatine, nitric oxide, polyamines, and protein; while proline is a major component of the connective tissue proteins, collagen and elastin. Because all three of these amino acids are a part of very significant processes, the presence of P5CS becomes an important regulator which makes sure that none of these three become deficient. Therefore, a lack of P5CS, due to mutations in the ALDH18A1 gene, often leads to neurodegeneration, joint laxity, skin hyperelasticity, bilateral sub capsular cataracts, and a plethora of other complications associated with impaired proline and ornithine synthesis.

== In plants ==
In all plant species, the activity of plant P5CS is likewise linked to the proline biosynthesis pathway, during both optimal and abiotic stress conditions. Similar to mammals, plants possess two P5CS isoenzymes encoded by paralogous genes, P5CS1 and P5CS2. Different plant species have evolved to utilize different P5CS paralogs in dependence on the environment. As such, P5CS2 acts as a housekeeping enzyme in Arabidopsis, this function is provided by P5CS1 in rice; in contrast Arabidopsis P5CS1 enables better performance under abiotic stress, while P5CS2 is responsible for improved abiotic stress response in rice. Arabidopsis P5CS2 is localized in cytoplasm and chloroplasts. P5CS-dependent synthesis of P5C is the rate-limiting step of proline biosynthesis, and is inhibited by the binding of the end product, L-proline, supposedly preventing the binding of glutamate to the entry site at the gamma-glutamyl kinase subunit.

== Interactions ==
P5CS has been seen to interact with:

- glutamate
- gamma-glutamyl phosphate
- ornithine
