= Proline dehydrogenase =

Enzyme

proline dehydrogenase
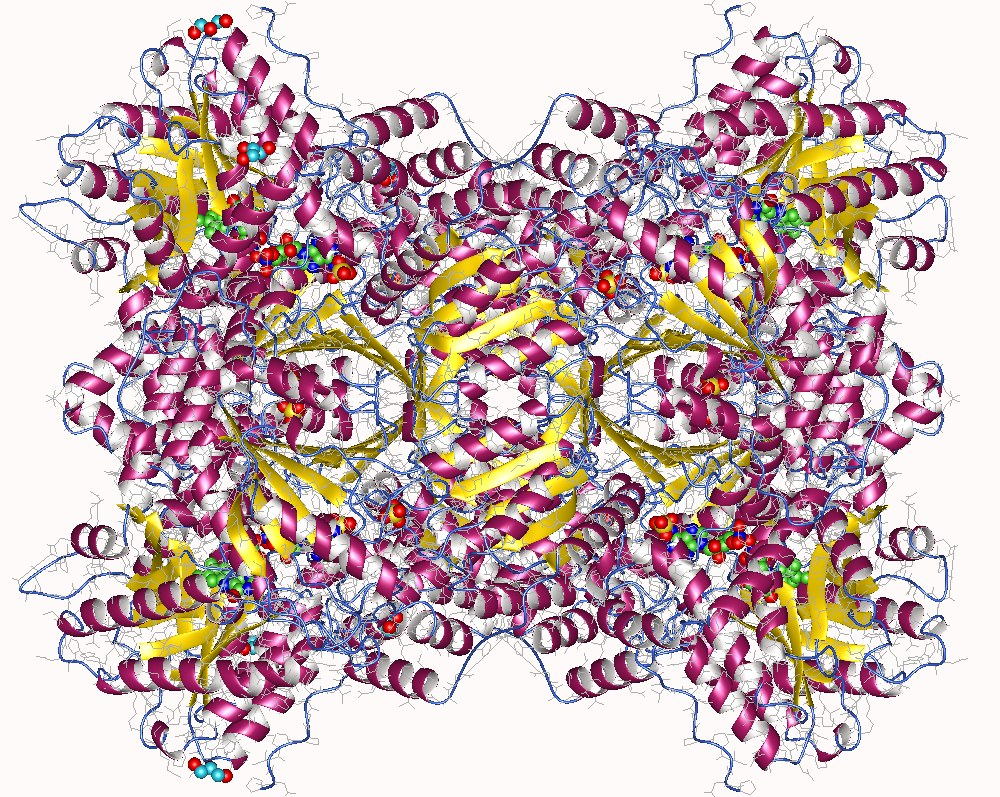
- Proline dehydrogenase tetramer, Bradyrhizobium diazoefficiens

Identifiers
- EC no.: 1.5.5.2
- CAS no.: 9050-70-8

Databases
- BRENDA: enzyme data
- ExPASy: NiceZyme view
- KEGG: enzyme entry
- MetaCyc: metabolic pathway
- Rhea: reactions
- PDB structures: RCSB PDB PDBe PDBsum
- Gene Ontology: AmiGO / QuickGO
Search
- PMC: articles
- PubMed: articles
- NCBI: proteins

In enzymology, proline dehydrogenase (PRODH) (EC 1.5.5.2, formerly EC 1.5.99.8) is an enzyme of the oxidoreductase family, active in the oxidation of L-proline to (S)-1-pyrroline-5-carboxylate during proline catabolism. The end product of this reaction is then further oxidized in a (S)-1-pyrroline-5-carboxylate dehydrogenase (P5CDH)-dependent reaction of the proline metabolism, or spent to produce ornithine, a crucial metabolite of ornithine and arginine metabolism. The systematic name of this enzyme class is L-proline:quinone oxidoreductase. Other names in common use include L-proline dehydrogenase, L-proline oxidase, and L-proline:(acceptor) oxidoreductase. It employs one cofactor, flavin adenine dinucleotide (FAD), which requires riboflavin (vitamin B2).

In humans, the primary proline dehydrogenase is encoded by the gene PRODH. It has a paralog, PRODH2, which has some low affinity for proline, but primarily acts a hydroxyproline dehydrogenase. Mutations in PRODH can lead to hyperprolinemia, a usually benign disorder which causes increased proline levels in blood and urine. However, some of the affected show neurological symptoms, such as epilepsy, or intellectual disability.

== Structure ==
The tertiary structure of PRODH consists of two interacting protein chains, connected by a mutual interaction between alpha helices of both chains. Each protein chain binds a separate FAD cofactor, necessary for the oxidative activity of the enzyme. The binding of FAD is mediated by electrostatic and non-polar interactions between the cofactor and twelve amino acid residues. In some bacteria, PRODH activity is exhibited in combination with the activity of (S)-1-pyrroline-5-carboxylate dehydrogenase (P5CDH) in an enzyme encoded by Proline Utilization A (putA) gene. Despite being two separate enzymes, eukaryote PRODH and P5CDH also show substrate channeling capabilities.

== Function ==
PRODH catalyzes the first step of proline catabolism, an FAD-dependent oxidation of proline, summarized by a chemical reaction:

L-proline
+ FAD
FADH +
(S)-1-pyrroline-5-carboxylic acid
L-glutamate-5-semialdehyde

The product, (S)-1-pyrroline-5-carboxylic acid is in chemical equilibrium with L-glutamate-5-semialdehyde.

PRODH is located in the inner mitochondrial membrane, which enables the electrons to be transferred to ubiquinone, a final electron acceptor of the reaction. The activity of this enzyme regulates endogenous proline content, all the while providing reducing power to the electron transport chain, eventually producing ATP.

== In plants ==
PRODH is crucial in regulating intracellular levels of proline, which is an osmotically active compound important in preventing water losses under abiotic stress. Arabidopsis genome contains two PRODH isoforms, PRODH1 and PRODH2, the latter active in response to the osmotic and biotic stress. Since the electrons abstracted from L-proline are transferred to electron transport chain, an excessive activity of PRODH may overload the electron transport chain, leading to the generation of reactive oxygen species (ROS), contributing to the hypersensitive response during biotic stress.

== Structural studies ==
As of late 2007, 9 structures have been solved for this class of enzymes, with PDB accession codes PDB: 1K87, PDB: 1TIW, PDB: 1TJ0, PDB: 1TJ1, PDB: 1TJ2, PDB: 1Y56, PDB: 2FZM, PDB: 2FZN, and PDB: 2G37.
