= NOXRED1 =

Human gene

Identifiers
- Aliases: NOXRED1, C14orf148, NADP-dependent oxidoreductase domain containing 1, NADP dependent oxidoreductase domain containing 1
- External IDs: MGI: 1918525; GeneCards: NOXRED1

Gene location (Human)
Chr.	Chromosome 14 (human)
Band	14q24.3	Start	77,394,021 bp
Band	14q24.3	End	77,423,523 bp

Gene location (Mouse)
Chr.	Chromosome 12 (mouse)
Band	12|12 D2	Start	87,267,814 bp
Band	12|12 D2	End	87,285,506 bp
RNA expression pattern
Bgee	Human / Mouse (ortholog); Top expressed in: testicle; gonad; sperm; left testis; right testis; right uterine tube; ventricular zone; monocyte; right lobe of liver; skin of leg / Top expressed in: seminiferous tubule; spermatid; granulocyte; embryo; embryo; blastocyst; morula; otic vesicle; ventricular zone; spermatocyte; More reference expression data
BioGPS	n/a
Gene ontology
Molecular function	oxidoreductase activity; molecular function; pyrroline-5-carboxylate reductase activity
Cellular component	cellular component
Biological process	biological process; L-proline biosynthetic process
Sources:Amigo / QuickGO
Orthologs
Databases	NCBI: entry; OMA: entry
Species	Human	Mouse
Entrez	122945	71275
Ensembl	ENSG00000165555	ENSMUSG00000072919
UniProt	Q6NXP6	Q9D3S5
RefSeq (mRNA)	NM_001113475; NM_138791; NM_001394980	NM_027744
RefSeq (protein)	NP_001106946	NP_082020
Location (UCSC)	Chr 14: 77.39 – 77.42 Mb	Chr 12: 87.27 – 87.29 Mb
PubMed search
- Wikidata
View/Edit Human	View/Edit Mouse

NADP-dependent oxidoreductase domain-containing protein 1 is a protein that in humans is encoded by the NOXRED1 gene. An alias of this gene is Chromosome 14 Open Reading Frame 148 (c14orf148). This gene is located on chromosome 14, at 14q24.3. NOXRED1 is predicted to be involved in pyrroline-5-carboxylate reductase activity as part of the L-proline biosynthetic pathway. It is expressed in a wide variety of tissues at a relatively low level, including the testes, thyroid, skin, small intestine, brain, kidney, colon, and more.

== Gene ==
NOXRED1 is coded on the minus strand of the human Chromosome 14 from nucleotides 77,394,021-77,423,523. It has a total of 9 exons and 8 introns, and it spans a total of 29,502 bases.

=== Neighborhood ===
The gene neighborhood of NOXRED1 includes Transmembrane p24 TraffickingProtein Family Member 8 (TMED8), Sterile Alpha Motif Domain 15 (SAMD15), VPS33B Interacting Protein (VIPAS39), and Activator of HSP90 ATPase Activity 1 (AHSA1).

== Transcripts ==
NOXRED1 has three known mRNA isoforms (table 2). The primary isoform is 2324 bases in length and is composed of 6 exons. Isoform 2 and Isoform 3 are 1773 and 1770 nucleotides long, respectively.

== Proteins ==
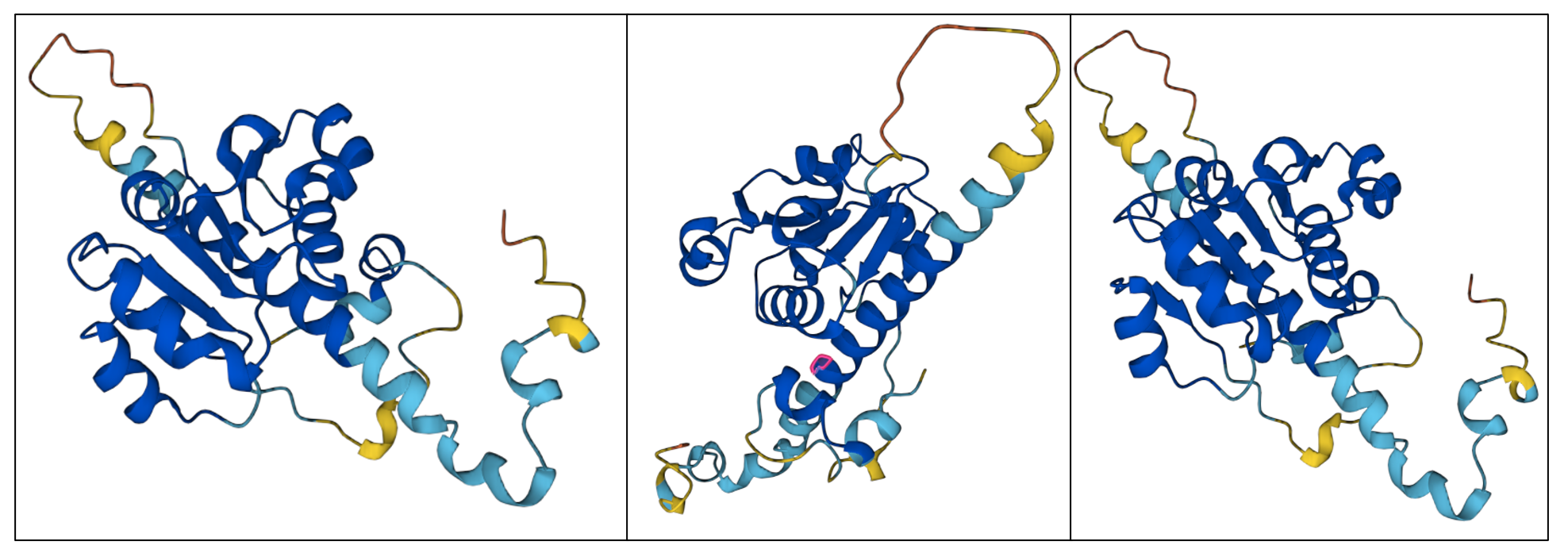
Predicted NOXRED1 Tertiary Structure. NOXRED1 tertiary structure predicted from AlphaFold. Coils indicate alpha helices, and arrows indicate beta sheets. The color gradient represents the confidence level of the predicted structure, with dark blue being high confidence, light blue being confident, yellow being low confidence, and orange being very low confidence.

NADP-dependent oxidoreductase domain-containing protein 1 (NOXRED1) is a protein which in humans is encoded by the gene NOXRED1. It is 359 residues long and has a molecular weight of ~39.9 kDa. This protein is enriched in leucine residues, in comparison to other human proteins. NOXRED1 is predicted to localize in the cytoplasm and perform functions involving pyrroline-5-carboxylate reductase. From residues 78-189, NOXRED1 contains the conserved protein domain family pyrroline-5-carboxylate reductase (ProC).

=== Protein isoforms ===
NOXRED1 has three known protein isoforms (Table 2). Isoform 1 is the largest and most abundant.

Isoform	Accession number	mRNA Length (nucleotides)	Accession number	Protein Length (amino acids)	Molecular Weight (kDa)
1	NM_001113475.3	2324	NP_001106946.1	359	39.9
2	NM_001394980.1	1773	XP_011534731.1	269	29.8
3	XM_011536429.4	1770	XP_016876458.1	234	25.9

Isoforms of NOXRED1. Information obtained from NCBI Nucleotide and NCBI Protein databases.

=== Protein level expression ===
==== Primary Antibody Data ====
ThermoFisher Scientific has developed a human polyclonal antibody targeting NOXRED1. It can be used for a variety of different functions, including immunocytochemistry, immunohistochemistry, immunoprecipitation, and western blotting. Additionally, the Human Protein Atlas database shows immunocytochemistry produced images of NOXRED1 within the A549, MCF-7, and U2OS cell lines

==== In situ hybridization data ====
The Allen Brain Institute shows that NOXRED1 is expressed at a moderate level throughout the Mus musculus brain

=== Protein interactions ===
Some predicted proteins that interact with the human NOXRED1 are Delta-1-pyrroline-5-carboxylate synthase and ornithine aminotransferase. Delta-1-pyrroline-5-carboxylate synthase catalyzes the conversion of glutamate to delta-1-pyrroline-5-carboxylate synthase. Ornithine aminotransferase is an enzyme that converts arginine and ornithine into glutamate and GABA. Both of these proteins are involved in the proline biosynthesis pathway.

== Homology and evolution ==
=== Paralogs ===
NOXRED1 has three orthologs. Pyrroline-5-carboxylate reductase 1 (PYCR1), pyrroline-5-carboxylate reductase 2 (PYCR2), and pyrroline-5-carboxylate reductase 3 (PYCR3) all are also involved in the synthesis of proline from pyrroline-5-carboxylate. PYCR1 is located at 17q25.3, PYCR2 is located at 1q42.12, and PYCR3 is located at 8q24.3.

Gene	Genus and species	Protein Accession Number	Sequence length (aa)	% Sequence Identity to Human Protein	% Sequence Similarity to Human Protein
NOXRED1	Homo sapiens	NP_001106946.1	359	100	100
PYCR2	Homo sapiens	NP_037460.2	320	15.4	23.3
PYCR3	Homo sapiens	NP_075566.3	274	13.6	23.8
PYCR1	Homo sapiens	NP_008838.2	319	13.2	20.6

Paralogs of NOXRED1. Percent sequence identity and similarity were calculated using EMBOSS Needle.

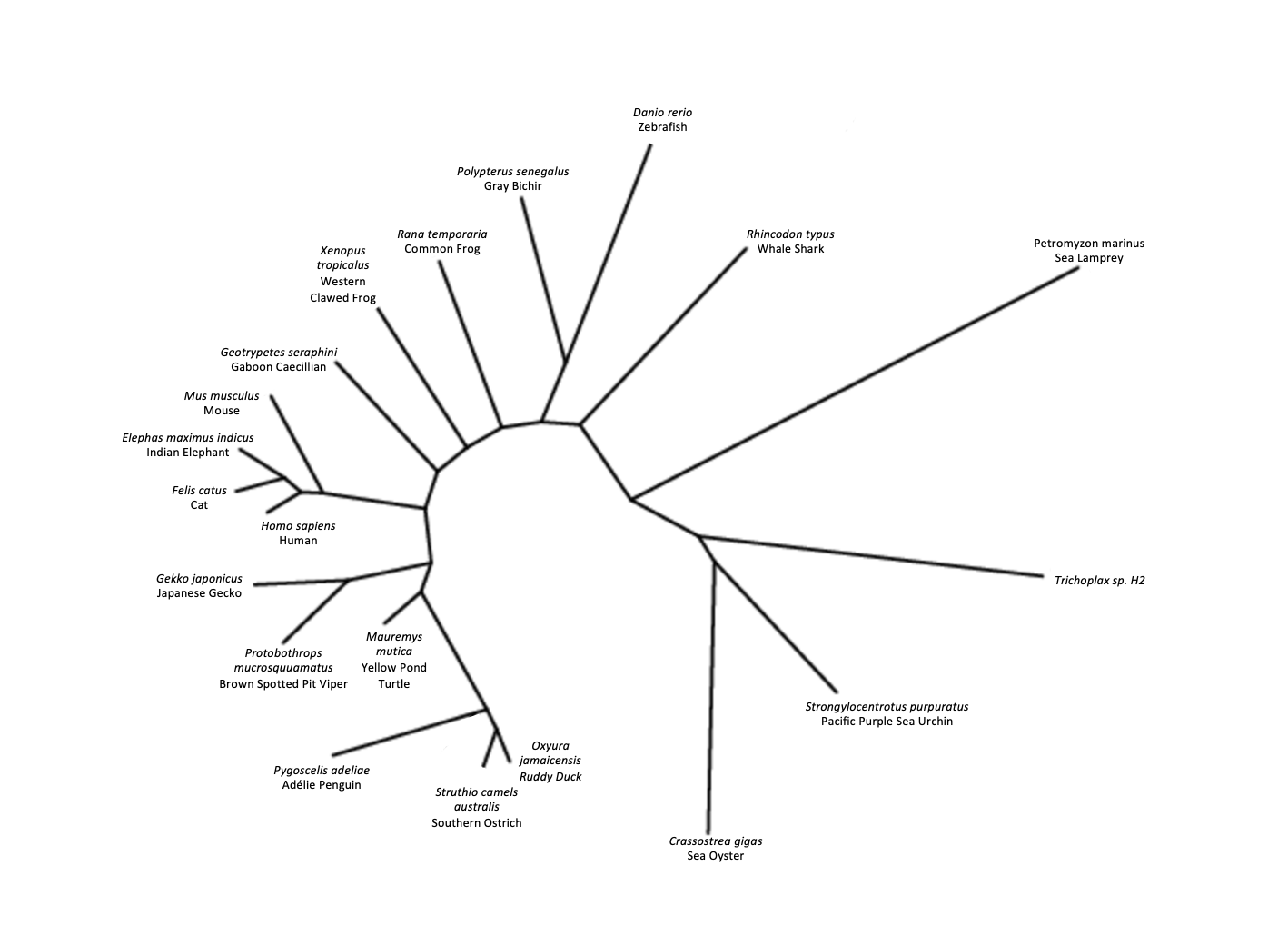
Phylogenetic Tree of NOXRED1 Orthologs. Created using phylogeny.fr one-click tree builder.

=== Orthologs ===
NOXRED1 was found to be highly conserved throughout history—there are existing orthologs within mammals, aves, reptiles, amphibians, bony fish, cartilaginous fish, trichoplaxes, and some invertebrates. Interestingly, orthologs were not able to be found in one of the three orders of amphibians—Urodela. Additionally, orthologs were not able to be found in insects, fungi, protists, plants, bacteria, or archaea^{25}. Listed in a table are a list of 20 different NOXRED1 protein orthologs from a diverse array of species, including mammals, aves, reptiles, amphibians, different classes of fish, and invertebrates.

Genus and species	Common name	Taxonomic Class	Taxonomic Order	DOD (MYA)	Accession number	AA Sequence Length	% Sequence Identity to Human Protein	% Sequence Similarity to Human Protein
Homo sapiens	Human	Mammalia	Primata	0	NP_001106946.1	359	100	100
Mus musculus	Mouse	Mammalia	Rodentia	87	NP_082020.1	366	60.6	76.9
Felis catus	Cat	Mammalia	Carnivora	94	XP_019688936.1	381	72	79.3
Elephas maximus indicus	Indian Elephant	Mammalia	Proboscidea	99	XP_049755695.1	384	69.4	77.2
Struthio camelus australis	Southern Ostrich	Aves	Struthioniformes	319	XP_009673940.1	345	44	60.4
Oxyura jamaicensis	Ruddy Duck	Aves	Anseriformes	319	XP_035184255.1	392	43.8	56.8
Pygoscelis adeliae	Adélie penguin	Aves	Spheniscoformes	319	XP_009317781.1	323	34.4	48.8
Mauremys mutica	Yellow Pond Turtle	Reptilia	Testudines	319	XP_044872068.1	372	47.5	65.3
Protobothrops mucrosquamatus	Brown Spotted Pit Viper	Reptilia	Serpentes	319	XP_029139298.1	388	39.8	58.8
Gekko japonicus	Japanese Gecko	Reptilia	Squamata	319	XP_015273827.1	403	37.6	56.6
Geotrypetes seraphini	Gaboon Caecilian	Amphibia	Gymnophiona	353	XP_033807528.1	371	45.2	59.7
Xenopus tropicalus	Western Clawed Frog	Amphibia	Anura	353	NP_001072734.1	344	40.9	56.5
Rana temporaria	Common Frog	Amphibia	Anura	353	XP_040189126.1	367	36.2	52.4
Polypterus senegalus	Gray bichir	Actinopterygii	Polypteriformes	431	XP_039598035.1	364	39.8	57.3
Danio rerio	Zebrafish	Actinopterygii	Cypriniformes	431	XP_005169929.1	333	36.8	53.8
Rhincodon typus	Whale Shark	Chondrichthyes	Orectolobiformes	464	XP_020369405.1	365	33.3	50.6
Petromyzon marinus	Sea Lampray	Hyperoartia	Petromyzontiformes	599	XP_032812106.1	359	25.7	37
Strongylocentrotus purpuratus	Pacific Purple Sea Urchin	Echinoidea	Echinoida	619	XP_011675891.2	380	28.3	47.3
Trichoplax sp. H2	Trichoplax H2	Trichoplax	-	661	RDD44387.1	382	28.2	46.1
Crassostrea gigas	Sea Oyster	Bivalvia	Ostreida	694	XP_011447367.2	366	31.6	49.7

Table 1. Orthologs of NOXRED1. Orthologs are grouped by taxonomic class and then sorted first by increasing date of divergence (MYA) and second by percent sequence identity to the human protein. Date of divergence was calculated using the pairwise divergence median time from Timetree.org. Percent sequence identity and similarity were calculated using EMBOSS Needle.

== Function/Biochemistry ==
The human NOXRED1 protein is predicted to play a role in the L-proline biosynthesis pathway.

== Clinical significance ==
NOXRED1 has a few clinically significant associations. Chen et al., 2020 found that the variant rs8012548 (an intron variant) within NOXRED1 is significantly associated withcutaneous melanoma specific survival, meaning that patients with cutaneous melanoma who have carry rs8012548 are less likely to perish due to the disease. Tabe-Bordbar et al., 2020 found that rs12890411 within intron 5 of NOXRED1 lies within an Estrogen Receptor Alpha (Erα) enhancer region. This variant is an eQTL for breast cancer, and it at least partially decreases the binding affinity of the transcription factor RELA. Yuan et al., 2021 predicted that NOXRED1 influences the pathogenesis of Alzheimer's disease and mild cognitive impairment by increasing oxidative stress within the limbic region. Nacita et al., 2015 reported that a patient with the interstitial deletion of 14q24-14q32 exhibits developmental and neurological delays, face dysmorphology, and epilepsy. Relating to the transcript, MacNair et al., 2016 found that NOXRED1 is downregulated in the motor neurons in mice with a TDP-43 mutation related to amyotrophic lateral sclerosis (ALS). Relating to the protein, Vandenbrouck et al., 2016 found that NOXRED1 is found within the proteome of human spermatozoa.
