= Proline (disambiguation) =

Proline is an amino acid.

- Proline (data page)

Proline or Pro-Line may also refer to:

- Proline FC, football club in Uganda
- ProLine (company), an electronics brand
- Pro-Line Racing, a manufacturer of radio-controlled car accessories
- Sport Select, Canadian betting games also known as Pro-Line in some areas
- Proline, a line of prosumer camcorders manufactured by Panasonic
- ProLine, a software package with a Unix-like shell, used to run bulletin board systems on Apple II computers
