= Pyrroline-2-carboxylate reductase =

pyrroline-2-carboxylate reductase

Identifiers
- EC no.: 1.5.1.1
- CAS no.: 9029-16-7

Databases
- IntEnz: IntEnz view
- BRENDA: BRENDA entry
- ExPASy: NiceZyme view
- KEGG: KEGG entry
- MetaCyc: metabolic pathway
- PRIAM: profile
- PDB structures: RCSB PDB PDBe PDBsum
- Gene Ontology: AmiGO / QuickGO
Search
- PMC: articles
- PubMed: articles
- NCBI: proteins

In enzymology, pyrroline-2-carboxylate reductase (EC 1.5.1.1) is an enzyme that catalyzes the chemical reaction

1-pyrroline-2-carboxylic acid
+ NADH
H^{+}
H^{+}
L-proline
+ NAD^{+}

The three substrates of this enzyme are 1-pyrroline-2-carboxylic acid, reduced nicotinamide adenine dinucleotide (NADH), and a proton. Its products are L-proline and oxidised (NAD^{+}). Nicotinamide adenine dinucleotide phosphate can be used as an alternative cofactor. The equivalent 6-membered nitrogen containing ring is also reduced, giving L-pipecolic acid.

This enzyme belongs to the family of oxidoreductases, specifically those acting on the CH-NH group of donors with NAD+ or NADP+ as acceptor. The systematic name of this enzyme class is L-proline:NAD(P)+ 2-oxidoreductase. This enzyme is also called Delta1-pyrroline-2-carboxylate reductase. This enzyme participates in lysine degradation and arginine and proline metabolism.

== See also ==
- Pyrroline-5-carboxylate reductase
