= 1-Pyrroline-5-carboxylate dehydrogenase =

Class of enzymes

1-pyrroline-5-carboxylate dehydrogenase

Identifiers
- EC no.: 1.2.1.88
- CAS no.: 9054-82-4

Databases
- BRENDA: enzyme data
- ExPASy: NiceZyme view
- KEGG: enzyme entry
- MetaCyc: metabolic pathway
- Rhea: reactions
- PDB structures: RCSB PDB PDBe PDBsum
- Gene Ontology: AmiGO / QuickGO
Search
- PMC: articles
- PubMed: articles
- NCBI: proteins

In enzymology, 1-pyrroline-5-carboxylate dehydrogenase (EC 1.2.1.88) is an enzyme that catalyzes the chemical reaction

(S)-1-pyrroline-5-carboxylic acid
L-glutamate-5-semialdehyde
+ NAD^{+}
H_{2}O
H^{+}
H_{2}O
H^{+}
L-glutamic acid
+ NADH

The three substrates of this enzyme are (S)-1-pyrroline-5-carboxylate, nicotinamide adenine dinucleotide (NAD^{+}), and water. The starting material is in chemical equilibrium with L-glutamate-5-semialdehyde, which is oxidised to L-glutamic acid, giving reduced NADH, and a proton.

This enzyme belongs to the family of oxidoreductases, specifically those acting on the CH-NH group of donors with NAD+ or NADP+ as acceptor. The systematic name of this enzyme class is (S)-1-pyrroline-5-carboxylate:NAD^{+} oxidoreductase. Other names in common use include delta-1-pyrroline-5-carboxylate dehydrogenase, 1-pyrroline dehydrogenase, pyrroline-5-carboxylate dehydrogenase, pyrroline-5-carboxylic acid dehydrogenase, L-pyrroline-5-carboxylate-NAD^{+} oxidoreductase, and 1-pyrroline-5-carboxylate:NAD^{+} oxidoreductase. This enzyme participates in glutamate metabolism and arginine and proline metabolism.

== Structural studies ==
As of late 2007, 14 structures have been solved for this class of enzymes, with PDB accession codes PDB: 2BHP, PDB: 2BHQ, PDB: 2BJA, PDB: 2BJK, PDB: 2EHQ, PDB: 2EHU, PDB: 2EII, PDB: 2EIT, PDB: 2EIW, PDB: 2EJ6, PDB: 2EJD, PDB: 2EJL, PDB: 2IY6, and PDB: 2J40.

== Human gene ==
In human, the protein is encoded by ALDH4A1 gene.
