= Imine reductase =

Industrially relevant enzyme

SkIRED
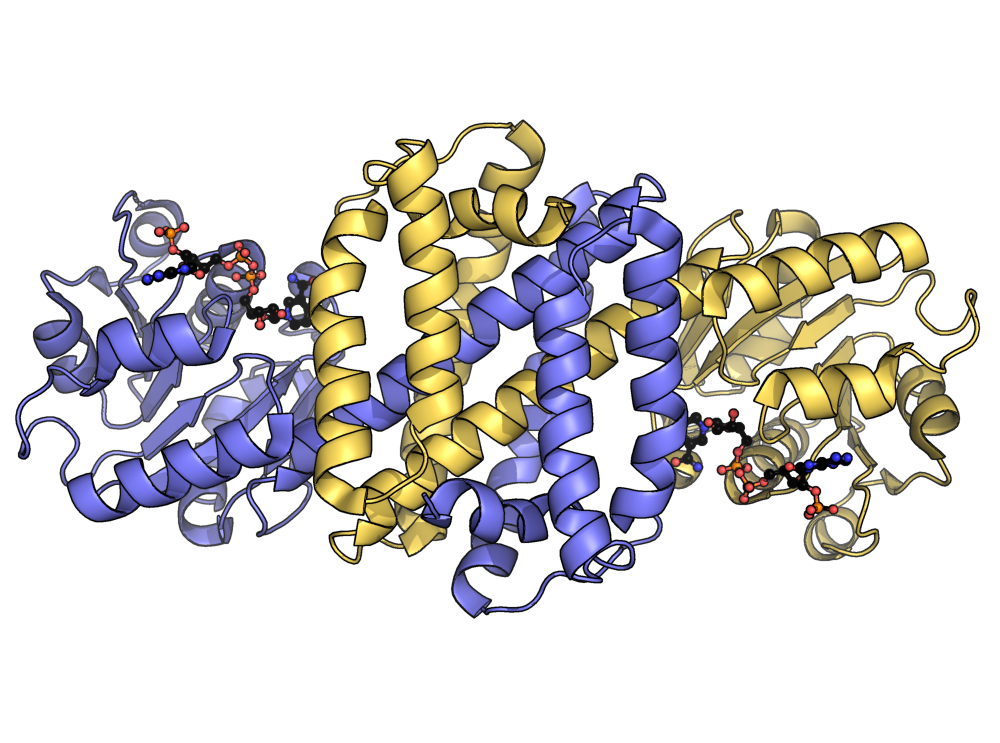
- Streptomyces kanamyceticus R-selective imine reductase PDB: 3ZHB

Identifiers
- EC no.: 1.5.1.48

Databases
- IntEnz: IntEnz view
- BRENDA: BRENDA entry
- ExPASy: NiceZyme view
- KEGG: KEGG entry
- MetaCyc: metabolic pathway
- PRIAM: profile
- PDB structures: RCSB PDB PDBe PDBsum
- Gene Ontology: AmiGO / QuickGO
Search
- PMC: articles
- PubMed: articles
- NCBI: proteins

An imine reductase (IRED) is an enzyme that reduces imines to amines. This family of enzymes is employed in the industrial production of amine-containing pharmaceuticals. The IRED enzymes that are found to catalyze both imine formation and imine reduction are called reductive aminases (RedAms).

== Discovery ==
IREDs were originally discovered in 2010 by screening bacterial strains for reducing activity on 2-methyl-1-pyrroline (2-MPN). Based on each member's ability to reduce 2-MPN to (R)- or (S)-2-methylpyrrolidine they are designated as R-selective or S-selective, respectively.

== Applications ==
IREDs have been employed to reduce imines formed from ketone-amine mixtures. The conversion is not a genuine reductive amination as only the second half of the two-part reaction is catalyzed. In 2017 an IRED was discovered that catalyzed both steps of reductive amination of a wide scope of ketone-amine pairs. These are dubbed reductive aminases (RedAms). Engineered RedAms have been employed in industrial processes to support production of pharmaceuticals for clinical trials and commercial manufacturing.

== Structure ==
IREDs are dimeric enzymes with each protomer having an N-terminal Rossmann nucleotide-binding domain and a C-terminal dimerization domain joined by a long interdomain α-helix. Each protomer's α-helical dimerization domain wraps around the interdomain helix of its dimer partner forming the substrate-binding cleft above the NAD(P)H cofactor binding site in the Rossmann domain. 3-Hydroxybutyrate dehydrogenases have similar N-terminal nucleotide-binding and C-terminal dimerization domains, but do not share the extensive dimerization interface of IREDs.

== See also ==
- 3-Hydroxybutyrate dehydrogenase
- Opine dehydrogenase
- Pyrroline-2-carboxylate reductase
- Pyrroline-5-carboxylate reductase
