= D-proline reductase (dithiol) =

Identifiers
- EC no.: 1.21.4.1
- CAS no.: 37255-43-9

Databases
- IntEnz: IntEnz view
- BRENDA: BRENDA entry
- ExPASy: NiceZyme view
- KEGG: KEGG entry
- MetaCyc: metabolic pathway
- PRIAM: profile
- PDB structures: RCSB PDB PDBe PDBsum
- Gene Ontology: AmiGO / QuickGO
Search
- PMC: articles
- PubMed: articles
- NCBI: proteins

In enzymology, a D-proline reductase (dithiol) (EC 1.21.4.1) is an enzyme that catalyzes the chemical reaction

5-aminopentanoate + lipoate $\rightleftharpoons$ D-proline + dihydrolipoate

Thus, the two substrates of this enzyme are 5-aminopentanoate and lipoate, whereas its two products are D-proline and dihydrolipoate.

This enzyme belongs to the family of oxidoreductases, specifically those acting on X-H and Y-H to form an X-Y bond with a disulfide as acceptor. The systematic name of this enzyme class is 5-aminopentanoate:lipoate oxidoreductase (cyclizing). This enzyme participates in arginine and proline metabolism. It employs one cofactor, pyruvate.
