= 4-oxoproline reductase =

Class of enzymes

Identifiers
- EC no.: 1.1.1.104
- CAS no.: 37250-37-6

Databases
- IntEnz: IntEnz view
- BRENDA: BRENDA entry
- ExPASy: NiceZyme view
- KEGG: KEGG entry
- MetaCyc: metabolic pathway
- PRIAM: profile
- PDB structures: RCSB PDB PDBe PDBsum
- Gene Ontology: AmiGO / QuickGO
Search
- PMC: articles
- PubMed: articles
- NCBI: proteins

In enzymology, 4-oxoproline reductase (EC 1.1.1.104) is an enzyme that catalyzes the chemical reaction

cis-4-hydroxyproline
+ NAD^{+}
H^{+}
H^{+}
4-oxo-L-proline
+ NADH

The substrates of this enzyme are cis-4-hydroxyproline, and oxidised nicotinamide adenine dinucleotide (NAD^{+}). Its products are 4-oxo-L-proline and reduced NADH.

This enzyme belongs to the family of oxidoreductases, specifically those acting on the CH-OH group of donor with NAD^{+} or NADP^{+} as acceptor. The systematic name of this enzyme class is 4-hydroxy-L-proline:NAD^{+} oxidoreductase. This enzyme is also called hydroxy-L-proline oxidase. This enzyme was originally thought to participate in the metabolism of arginine and proline. However, recent data show that it is unlikely since neither 4-oxo-L-proline nor cis-4-hydroxy-L-proline are metabolites of these metabolic pathways.

== Gene ==
The gene encoding 4-oxo-L-proline reductase was identified as 3-hydroxybutyrate dehydrogenase 2 (BDH2) by Sebastian Kwiatkowski and co-workers in 2022. The enzyme is a member of the Short-chain Dehydrogenases/Reductases (SDR) family of enzymes.
