= Cephalosporin-C transaminase =

Identifiers
- EC no.: 2.6.1.74
- CAS no.: 122096-91-7

Databases
- IntEnz: IntEnz view
- BRENDA: BRENDA entry
- ExPASy: NiceZyme view
- KEGG: KEGG entry
- MetaCyc: metabolic pathway
- PRIAM: profile
- PDB structures: RCSB PDB PDBe PDBsum
- Gene Ontology: AmiGO / QuickGO
Search
- PMC: articles
- PubMed: articles
- NCBI: proteins

Cephalosporin-C transaminase (EC 2.6.1.74) is an enzyme that catalyzes a reversible chemical reaction which interconverts a D-amino acid with the corresponding α-keto acid. The amino group is transferred to α-ketoglutaric acid, giving L-glutamic acid. Unlike D-amino-acid transaminase, which can also use D-amino acids such as D-alanine as substrates, cephalosporin-C transaminase has high activity with the β-lactam antibiotic, cephalosporin C. In that case, the product keto acid has the chemical name (7R)-7-(5-carboxy-5-oxopentanoyl)aminocephalosporinate.

Formally, the enzyme is a transferase, specifically a transaminase, which transfer nitrogenous groups. The systematic name of this enzyme class is cephalosporin-C:2-oxoglutarate aminotransferase. Other names in common use include cephalosporin C aminotransferase, and L-alanine:cephalosporin-C aminotransferase.

cephalosporin C
+
α-ketoglutaric acid
a keto acid
+
L-glutamic acid

It has been suggested that this reaction could be used as part of a sequence of enzyme-cataylsed reactions to remove the sidechain of cephalosporin C and produce 7-aminocephalosporanic acid, for conversion into other commercial antibiotics.
