= 4-hydroxyglutamate transaminase =

Class of enzymes

Identifiers
- EC no.: 2.6.1.23
- CAS no.: 37277-86-4

Databases
- IntEnz: IntEnz view
- BRENDA: BRENDA entry
- ExPASy: NiceZyme view
- KEGG: KEGG entry
- MetaCyc: metabolic pathway
- PRIAM: profile
- PDB structures: RCSB PDB PDBe PDBsum
- Gene Ontology: AmiGO / QuickGO
Search
- PMC: articles
- PubMed: articles
- NCBI: proteins

4-hydroxyglutamate transaminase (EC 2.6.1.23) is an enzyme that catalyzes the reversible chemical reaction

(4R)-4-hydroxy-L-glutamic acid
+
α-ketoglutaric acid
D-4-hydroxy-2-oxoglutaric acid
+
L-glutamic acid

The two substrates of this enzyme characterised from rat liver are (4R)-4-hydroxy-L-glutamic acid and α-ketoglutaric acid. Its products are D-4-hydroxy-2-oxoglutaric acid and L-glutamic acid. It has been suggested that this enzyme is the same as aspartate transaminase.

This enzyme is a transferase, specifically a transaminase, which transfer nitrogenous groups. The systematic name of this enzyme class is 4-hydroxy-L-glutamate:2-oxoglutarate aminotransferase. This enzyme is also called 4-hydroxyglutamate aminotransferase. It participates in arginine and proline metabolism.
