= Hydroxyproline dehydrogenase =

Enzyme found in humans

PRODH2

Identifiers
- Aliases: PRODH2, HSPOX1, HYPDH, proline dehydrogenase 2
- External IDs: OMIM: 616377; MGI: 1929093; GeneCards: PRODH2
Enzyme activity
EC #	BRENDA	ExPASy	KEGG	MetaCyc
1.5.5.2	↗	↗	↗	↗
1.5.5.3	↗	↗	↗	↗

Gene location (Human)
Chr.	Chromosome 19 (human)
Band	19q13.12	Start	35,799,988 bp
Band	19q13.12	End	35,813,299 bp

Gene location (Mouse)
Chr.	Chromosome 7 (mouse)
Band	7|7 B1	Start	30,193,047 bp
Band	7|7 B1	End	30,212,827 bp
RNA expression pattern
Bgee	Human / Mouse (ortholog); Top expressed in: right lobe of liver; kidney tubule; glomerulus; metanephric glomerulus; human kidney; Skeletal muscle tissue of rectus abdominis; renal medulla; sperm; body of pancreas; cartilage tissue / Top expressed in: left lobe of liver; right kidney; yolk sac; human kidney; gallbladder; parietal layer of glomerular capsule; urethra; tongue; morula; embryo; More reference expression data
BioGPS	n/a
Gene ontology
Molecular function	oxidoreductase activity; FAD binding; oxidoreductase activity, acting on the CH-NH group of donors; proline dehydrogenase activity
Cellular component	mitochondrion; mitochondrial inner membrane
Biological process	proline metabolic process; proline catabolic process; proline catabolic process to glutamate; glyoxylate metabolic process
Sources:Amigo / QuickGO
Orthologs
Databases	NCBI: entry; OMA: entry
Species	Human	Mouse
Entrez	58510	56189
Ensembl	ENSG00000250799	ENSMUSG00000036892
UniProt	Q9UF12	Q8VCZ9
RefSeq (mRNA)	NM_021232; NM_001378292; NM_001378293; NM_001378294	NM_019546
RefSeq (protein)	NP_067055; NP_001365221; NP_001365222; NP_001365223	NP_062419
Location (UCSC)	Chr 19: 35.8 – 35.81 Mb	Chr 7: 30.19 – 30.21 Mb
PubMed search
- Wikidata
View/Edit Human	View/Edit Mouse

Hydroxyproline dehydrogenase, also called proline dehydrogenase 2, is an enzyme that in humans is encoded by the PRODH2 gene. This enzyme is located in the mitochondrial inner membrane, where it is involved in breaking down hydroxyproline, a modified form of the amino acid proline and major component of collagen. The human enzyme is also able to act on proline (similar to PRODH), but with much lower affinity.

== Function ==
As an enzyme, hydroxyproline dehydrogenase (EC 1.5.5.3) acts on hydroxyproline to remove the two hydrogens bonded to the nitrogen atom. More precisely, it catalyses the following reaction:

trans-4-hydroxy-L-proline + a quinone = (3R,5S)-1-pyrroline-3-hydroxy-5-carboxylate + a quinol + H^{+}

In humans, the quinone cofactor used is coenzyme Q_{10}, and it does not act on other diastereomers like trans-4-D-hydroxyproline or cis-4-L-hydroxyproline. It is also able to act on proline as a proline dehydrogenase (EC 1.5.5.3) with low affinity.
