= C5H11NO3 =

The molecular formula C_{5}H_{11}NO_{3} (molar mass: 133.15 g/mol) may refer to:

- Amyl nitrate
- Hydroxyaminovaleric acid (HAVA)
