= Hyperprolinemia =

- Other names: Prolinemia, prolinuria
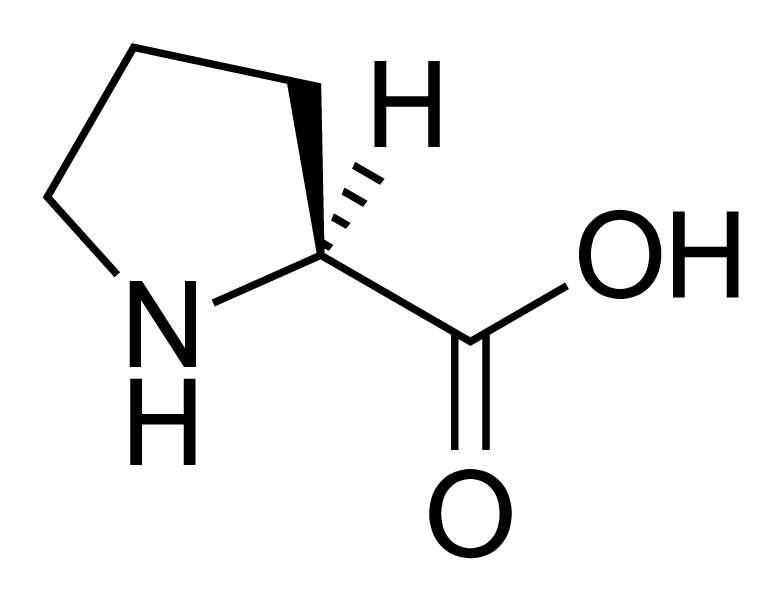
- Proline
- Specialty: Medical genetics

Hyperprolinemia is a condition which occurs when the amino acid proline is not broken down properly by the enzymes proline oxidase or pyrroline-5-carboxylate dehydrogenase, causing a buildup of proline in the body.

== Presentation ==
The clinical features of hyperprolinemia are unclear. Nephropathy, uncontrolled seizures, intellectual disabilities, and schizophrenia have been reported in hyperprolinemia I (mutation of PRODH gene), but a benign phenotype without neurological problems has also been reported. An evidence suggests that hyperprolinemia II (mutation of ALDH4A1 gene) might reduce the threshold for convulsions, thereby increasing the sensitivity of individuals with influenza-associated encephalopathy. Severity and manifestations of hyperprolinemia depending on the nature and number of hits affecting the gene locus.

== Genetics ==
Hyperprolinemia has an autosomal recessive pattern of inheritance.

Mutations in the ALDH4A1 and PRODH genes cause hyperprolinemia.

Hyperprolinemia type I is caused by a mutation in the PRODH gene, which codes for the enzyme proline oxidase. This enzyme begins the process of degrading proline by starting the reaction that converts it to pyrroline-5-carboxylate. A study found that four mutations of PRODH (R185Q, L289M, A455S, and A472T) result in mild (<30%), six (Q19P, A167V, R185W, D426N, V427M, and R431H) in moderate (30%-70%), and five (P406L, L441P, R453C, T466M, and Q521E) in severe (>70%) reduction in the proline oxidase activity, whereas one (Q521R) increases its activity. The V427M, R453C, T466M and A472T alleles have been reported repeatably in some schizophrenia patients. However, this risk is related to the PRODH gene variant rather than the excess proline in the body itself, as the T466M and A472T mutations were found to be risky although they did not cause hyperprolinemia.

Hyperprolinemia type II is caused by a mutation in the ALDH4A1 gene, for the enzyme 1-pyrroline-5-carboxylate dehydrogenase. This enzyme helps to break down the pyrroline-5-carboxylate produced in the previous reaction, converting it to the amino acid glutamate. The conversion between proline and glutamine, and the reverse reaction controlled by different enzymes, are important factors required to maintain proper metabolism and protein production.

A deficiency of either proline oxidase or pyrroline-5-carboxylate dehydrogenase results in a buildup of proline in the body. A deficiency of the latter enzyme leads to higher levels of proline and a buildup of the intermediate breakdown product pyrroline-5-carboxylate, causing the signs and symptoms of hyperprolinemia type II.Hyperprolinemia is inherited in an autosomal recessive pattern, which means two copies of the gene in each cell are altered. Most often, the parents of an individual with an autosomal recessive disorder are heterozygous carriers, having only one copy of the altered gene, without having signs and symptoms of the disorder.

In about one-third of cases of hyperprolinemia, individuals carrying one copy of an altered PRODH gene have moderately elevated levels of proline in their blood, but these levels do not cause any health problems. Individuals with one altered ALDH4A1 gene have normal levels of proline in their blood.

== Diagnosis ==
The diagnostic criteria for hyperprolinemia are based on blood plasma proline level, with or without measurements of urinary P5C.

=== Types ===
==== Hyperprolinemia type I ====
It is difficult to determine the prevalence of hyperprolinemia type I, as many people with the condition are asymptomatic. People with hyperprolinemia type I have proline levels in their blood between 3 and 10 times the normal level. Some individuals with type I exhibit seizures, intellectual disability, or other neurological problems.

==== Hyperprolinemia type II ====
Hyperprolinemia type II results in proline levels in the blood between 10 and 15 times higher than normal, and high levels of a related compound called pyrroline-5-carboxylate. This rare form of the disorder may appear benign at times, but often involves seizures, convulsions, and intellectual disability.

Hyperprolinemia can also occur with other conditions, such as malnutrition or liver disease. In particular, individuals with conditions that cause elevated levels of lactic acid in the blood, such as lactic acidemia, are likely to have elevated proline levels, because lactic acid inhibits the breakdown of proline.

== Treatment ==
Dietary restriction of proline intake. Some findings also support vitamin D supplementation in patients with elevated proline. Long-term vitamin B6 supplementation may prevent a risk of seizures in the case of hyperprolinaemia II. The strong oxidative stress was detected in the brain tissue from rats with hyperprolinemia, thefore antioxidants such as vitamin E, vitamin C, and glutathione may be effective therapeutic agents in this disorder and should be used for hyperprolinemia in patients as soon as possible.

== Research ==
A 2005 study on rats suggested that hyperprolinemia causes cognitive dysfunction.

== See also ==
- List of amino acid metabolism disorders
- Inborn error of metabolism
