= PYCR2 =

Protein-coding gene in humans

Identifiers
- Aliases: PYCR2, P5CR2, HLD10, pyrroline-5-carboxylate reductase family member 2, pyrroline-5-carboxylate reductase 2
- External IDs: OMIM: 616406; MGI: 1277956; GeneCards: PYCR2
Enzyme activity
EC #	BRENDA	ExPASy	KEGG	MetaCyc
1.5.1.2	↗	↗	↗	↗

Gene location (Human)
Chr.	Chromosome 1 (human)
Band	1q42.12	Start	225,919,877 bp
Band	1q42.12	End	225,924,340 bp

Gene location (Mouse)
Chr.	Chromosome 1 (mouse)
Band	1|1 H4	Start	180,731,858 bp
Band	1|1 H4	End	180,735,653 bp
RNA expression pattern
Bgee	Human / Mouse (ortholog); Top expressed in: cardiac muscle tissue of right atrium; right uterine tube; myocardium of left ventricle; C1 segment; right adrenal gland; anterior pituitary; left adrenal gland; right adrenal cortex; left adrenal cortex; granulocyte / Top expressed in: fetal liver hematopoietic progenitor cell; islet of Langerhans; endocardial cushion; lacrimal gland; condyle; seminal vesicula; endothelial cell of lymphatic vessel; fossa; somite; internal carotid artery; More reference expression data
BioGPS	n/a
Gene ontology
Molecular function	pyrroline-5-carboxylate reductase activity; oxidoreductase activity; protein binding
Cellular component	mitochondrial matrix; cytoplasm; mitochondrion
Biological process	L-proline biosynthetic process; cellular response to oxidative stress; proline biosynthetic process; cellular amino acid biosynthetic process
Sources:Amigo / QuickGO
Orthologs
Databases	NCBI: entry; OMA: entry
Species	Human	Mouse
Entrez	29920	69051
Ensembl	ENSG00000143811	ENSMUSG00000026520
UniProt	Q96C36	Q922Q4
RefSeq (mRNA)	NM_013328; NM_001271681	NM_133705
RefSeq (protein)	NP_001258610; NP_037460	NP_598466
Location (UCSC)	Chr 1: 225.92 – 225.92 Mb	Chr 1: 180.73 – 180.74 Mb
PubMed search
- Wikidata
View/Edit Human	View/Edit Mouse

Pyrroline-5-carboxylate reductase family, member 2 is a protein that in humans is encoded by the PYCR2 gene.

== Function ==
This gene belongs to the pyrroline-5-carboxylate reductase family. The encoded mitochondrial protein catalyzes the conversion of pyrroline-5-carboxylate to proline, which is the last step in proline biosynthesis. Loss of PYCR2 does not lead to a gross defect in mitochondrial protein synthesis, but loss of function of PYCR2 leads to increased apoptosis under oxidative stress.

== Clinical significance ==
Mutations in the PYCR2 gene have been identified as the cause of a unique syndrome characterized by postnatal microcephaly, hypomyelination, and reduced cerebral white-matter volume. Hypomyelination and the absence of wrinkly skin makes this condition distinct from that caused by previously reported mutations in the gene encoding PYCR2's isozyme, PYCR1, suggesting a unique and indispensable role for PYCR2 in the human CNS during development. This is substantiated by the fact that PYCR2 mRNA is moderately expressed in the developing human brain, and in much higher forms than either of the other two isoforms. Although PYCR2 is an enzyme for proline biosynthesis, systemic deprivation of proline does not appear to be the pathogenetic mechanism of this condition, given that plasma amino acid analysis in two affected individuals did not show low proline levels. Furthermore, mitochondrial protein synthesis was not affected in PYCR2-deficient cells. Therefore, deficiency of proline, as a building block of proteins, might not be the major pathophysiology. However, proline has been reported as a non-enzymatic antioxidant that suppresses apoptosis, and therefore local proline biosynthesis in neurons might be important for neuronal protection against oxidative stress.

The PYCR family also has been correlated with melanoma cells. PYCR2 as well as PYCR are abundant in melanoma cells but not detected in melanocytes.
