= 2,4-diaminopentanoate dehydrogenase =

Class of enzymes

Identifiers
- EC no.: 1.4.1.12
- CAS no.: 39346-26-4

Databases
- IntEnz: IntEnz view
- BRENDA: BRENDA entry
- ExPASy: NiceZyme view
- KEGG: KEGG entry
- MetaCyc: metabolic pathway
- PRIAM: profile
- PDB structures: RCSB PDB PDBe PDBsum
- Gene Ontology: AmiGO / QuickGO
Search
- PMC: articles
- PubMed: articles
- NCBI: proteins

In enzymology, 2,4-diaminopentanoate dehydrogenase (EC 1.4.1.12) is an enzyme that catalyzes the chemical reaction

2,4-diaminopentanoic acid
+ NAD^{+}
H_{2}O
H^{+}
H_{2}O
H^{+}
2-amino-4-oxopentanoic acid
+ NADH + NH_{3}

The substrates of this enzyme are (2R,4S)-2,4-diaminopentanoic acid, water, and oxidised nicotinamide adenine dinucleotide (NAD^{+}). Its products are (2R)-2-amino-4-oxopentanoic acid, reduced NADH, ammonia, and a proton. Nicotinamide adenine dinucleotide phosphate can be used as an alternative cofactor.

This enzyme belongs to the family of oxidoreductases, specifically those acting on the CH-NH_{2} group of donors with NAD+ or NADP+ as acceptor. The systematic name of this enzyme class is 2,4-diaminopentanoate:NAD(P)+ oxidoreductase (deaminating). This enzyme is also called 2,4-diaminopentanoic acid C4 dehydrogenase. This enzyme participates in 3 metabolic pathways: lysine degradation, arginine and proline metabolism, and d-arginine and d-ornithine metabolism.
