= Proline dehydrogenase 1 =

Enzyme found in humans

An Error has occurred retrieving Wikidata item for infobox

Proline dehydrogenase 1, mitochondrial, also called proline oxidase, is an enzyme that in humans is encoded by the PRODH gene.

The protein encoded by this gene is a mitochondrial proline dehydrogenase which catalyzes the first step in proline catabolism. Deletion of this gene has been associated with type I hyperprolinemia. The gene is located on chromosome 22q11.21, a region which has also been associated with the contiguous gene deletion syndromes: DiGeorge syndrome and CATCH22 syndrome.

== Function ==
Proline oxidase, or proline dehydrogenase, functions as the initiator of the proline cycle. Proline metabolism is especially important in nutrient stress because proline is readily available from the breakdown of extracellular matrix (ECM), and the degradation of proline through the proline cycle initiated by proline oxidase (PRODH), a mitochondrial inner membrane enzyme, can generate ATP. This degradative pathway generates glutamate and alpha-ketoglutarate, products that can play an anaplerotic role for the TCA cycle. The proline cycle is also in a metabolic interlock with the pentose phosphate pathway providing another bioenergetic mechanism. The induction of stress either by glucose withdrawal or by treatment with rapamycin, stimulated degradation of proline and increased PRODH catalytic activity. Under these conditions PRODH was responsible, at least in part, for maintenance of ATP levels. Activation of AMP-activated protein kinase (AMPK), the cellular energy sensor, by 5-aminoimidazole-4-carboxamide ribonucleoside (AICAR), also markedly upregulated PRODH and increased PRODH-dependent ATP levels, further supporting its role during stress. Glucose deprivation increased intracellular proline levels, and expression of PRODH activated the pentose phosphate pathway. Therefore, the induction of the proline cycle under conditions of nutrient stress may be a mechanism by which cells switch to a catabolic mode for maintaining cellular energy levels.

== Clinical significance ==
Mutations in the PRODH gene are associated with Proline Dehydrogenase deficiency. Many case studies have reported on this genetic disorder. In one such case study, 4 unrelated patients with HPI and a severe neurologic phenotype were shown to have the following common features: psychomotor delay from birth, often associated with hypotonia, severe language delay, autistic features, behavioral problems, and seizures. One patient who was heterozygous for a 22q11 microdeletion also had dysmorphic features. Four previously reported patients with HPI and neurologic involvement had a similar phenotype. This case study showed that Hyperprolinemia, Type I (HPI) may not always be a benign condition, and that the severity of the clinical phenotype appears to correlate with the serum proline level. Still, in another case study, clinical features from 4 unrelated patients included early motor and cognitive developmental delay, speech delay, autistic features, hyperactivity, stereotypic behaviors, and seizures. All patients had increased plasma and urine proline levels. All patients had biallelic mutations in the PRODH gene, often with several variants on the same allele. Residual enzyme activity ranged from null in the most severely affected patient to 25 to 30% in those with a relatively milder phenotype.
