= Aldehyde dehydrogenase 4 family, member A1 =

Protein found in humans

ALDH4A1

Identifiers
- Aliases: ALDH4A1, ALDH4, P5CD, P5CDh, Aldehyde dehydrogenase 4 family, member A1, aldehyde dehydrogenase 4 family member A1
- External IDs: OMIM: 606811; MGI: 2443883; GeneCards: ALDH4A1
Available structures
PDB	Ortholog search: PDBe RCSB
PDB	List of PDB id codes 3V9G, 3V9H, 3V9I, 4OE5
Enzyme activity
EC #	BRENDA	ExPASy	KEGG	MetaCyc
1.2.1.88	↗	↗	↗	↗

Gene location (Human)
Chr.	Chromosome 1 (human)
Band	1p36.13	Start	18,871,430 bp
Band	1p36.13	End	18,902,724 bp

Gene location (Mouse)
Chr.	Chromosome 4 (mouse)
Band	4 D3|4 70.79 cM	Start	139,350,177 bp
Band	4 D3|4 70.79 cM	End	139,377,001 bp
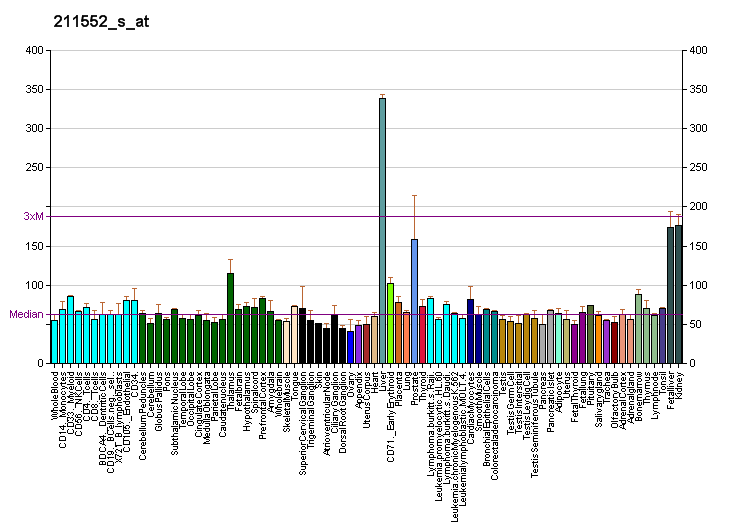

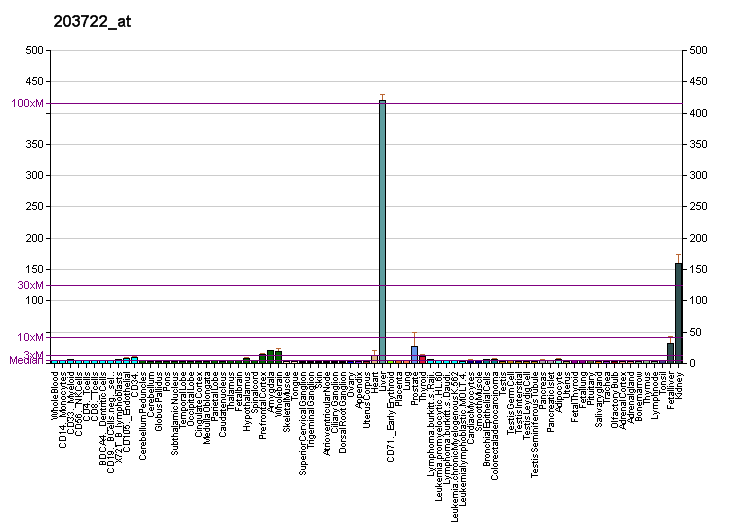
RNA expression pattern
Bgee	Human / Mouse (ortholog); Top expressed in: right lobe of liver; kidney tubule; human kidney; muscle of thigh; gastrocnemius muscle; putamen; amygdala; caudate nucleus; right frontal lobe; cingulate gyrus / Top expressed in: right kidney; left lobe of liver; human kidney; proximal tubule; muscle of thigh; lip; right ventricle; skeletal muscle tissue; triceps brachii muscle; granulocyte; More reference expression data
BioGPS	More reference expression data
Gene ontology
Molecular function	electron transfer activity; 1-pyrroline-5-carboxylate dehydrogenase activity; oxidoreductase activity; aldehyde dehydrogenase (NAD+) activity; identical protein binding; oxidoreductase activity, acting on the aldehyde or oxo group of donors, NAD or NADP as acceptor
Cellular component	mitochondrial matrix; mitochondrion
Biological process	metabolism; 4-hydroxyproline catabolic process; proline catabolic process to glutamate; proline catabolic process; proline metabolic process; glyoxylate metabolic process; electron transport chain
Sources:Amigo / QuickGO
Orthologs
Databases	NCBI: entry; OMA: entry
Species	Human	Mouse
Entrez	8659	212647
Ensembl	ENSG00000159423	ENSMUSG00000028737
UniProt	P30038	Q8CHT0
RefSeq (mRNA)	NM_001161504; NM_003748; NM_170726; NM_001319218	NM_175438
RefSeq (protein)	NP_001154976; NP_001306147; NP_003739; NP_733844	NP_780647
Location (UCSC)	Chr 1: 18.87 – 18.9 Mb	Chr 4: 139.35 – 139.38 Mb
PubMed search
- Wikidata
View/Edit Human	View/Edit Mouse

Delta-1-pyrroline-5-carboxylate dehydrogenase, mitochondrial is an enzyme that in humans is encoded by the ALDH4A1 gene.

This protein belongs to the aldehyde dehydrogenase family of proteins. This enzyme is a mitochondrial matrix NAD-dependent dehydrogenase that catalyzes the second step of the proline degradation pathway, converting pyrroline-5-carboxylate to glutamate. Deficiency of this enzyme is associated with type II hyperprolinemia, an autosomal recessive disorder characterized by accumulation of delta-1-pyrroline-5-carboxylate (P5C) and proline. Two transcript variants encoding the same protein have been identified for this gene.
