= Reductive amination =

Conversion of a carbonyl to an amine

Reaction type	Coupling reaction

Identifiers
RSC ontology ID	RXNO:0000335

Reductive amination (also known as reductive alkylation) is a form of amination that converts a carbonyl group to an amine via an intermediate imine. The carbonyl group is most commonly a ketone or an aldehyde. It is a common method to make amines and is widely used in green chemistry since it can be done catalytically in one-pot under mild conditions. In biochemistry, dehydrogenase enzymes use reductive amination to produce the amino acid glutamate. Additionally, there is ongoing research on alternative synthesis mechanisms with various metal catalysts which allow the reaction to be less energy taxing, and require milder reaction conditions. Investigation into biocatalysts, such as imine reductases, have allowed for higher selectivity in the reduction of chiral amines which is an important factor in pharmaceutical synthesis.

== Reaction process ==
Reductive amination occurs between a carbonyl such as an aldehyde or ketone and an amine in the presence of a reducing agent. The reaction conditions are neutral or weakly acidic.

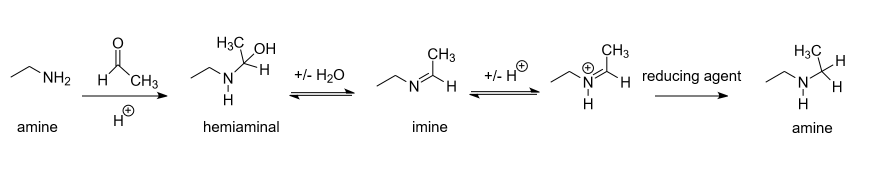
The intermediates of a reductive amination reaction.

=== Reaction steps ===
1. The nucleophilic amine reacts at the carbon of the carbonyl group to form a hemiaminal species
2. reversible loss of one molecule of water from the hemiaminal species by alkylimino-de-oxo-bisubstitution to form the imine intermediate. The equilibrium between aldehyde/ketone and imine is shifted toward imine formation by dehydration.
3. The intermediate imine can be isolated or reacted in-situ with a suitable reducing agent (e.g., sodium borohydride) to produce the amine product. Intramolecular reductive amination can also occur to afford a cyclic amine product if the amine and carbonyl are on the same molecule of starting material.

There are two ways to conduct a reductive amination reaction: direct and indirect.

=== Direct reductive amination ===
In a direct reaction, the carbonyl and amine starting materials and the reducing agent are combined and the reductions are done sequentially. These are often one-pot reactions since the imine intermediate is not isolated before the final reduction to the product. Instead, as the reaction proceeds, the imine becomes favoured for reduction over the carbonyl starting material. The two most common methods for direct reductive amination are hydrogenation with catalytic platinum, palladium, or nickel catalysts and the use of hydride reducing agents like cyanoborohydride (NaBH_{3}CN).

=== Indirect reductive amination ===
Indirect reductive amination, also called a stepwise reduction, isolates the imine intermediate. In a separate step, the isolated imine intermediate is reduced to form the amine product.

== Designing a reductive amination reaction ==
There are many considerations to be made when designing a reductive amination reaction.

1. Chemoselectivity issues may arise since the carbonyl group can also be reduced.
2. The reaction between the carbonyl and amine are in equilibrium, favouring the carbonyl unless water is removed from the system.
3. reduction-sensitive intermediates may form in the reaction which can affect chemoselectivity.
4. The amine substrate, imine intermediate, or amine product might deactivate the catalyst.
5. Acyclic imines have E/Z isomers. This makes it difficult to create enantiopure chiral compounds through stereoselective reductions.

To solve the last issue, asymmetric reductive amination reactions can be used to synthesize an enantiopure product of chiral amines. In asymmetric reductive amination, a carbonyl that can be converted from achiral to chiral is used. The carbonyl undergoes condensation with an amine in the presence of H_{2} and a chiral catalyst to form the imine intermediate, which is then reduced to form the amine. However, this method is still limiting to synthesize primary amines which are non-selective and prone to overalkylation.

== Common reducing agents ==
=== Sodium borohydride ===
Sodium borohydride (NaBH_{4)} reduces both imines and carbonyl groups. However, it is not very selective and can reduce other reducible functional groups present in the reaction. To ensure that this does not occur, reagents with weak electrophilic carbonyl groups, poor nucleophilic amines and sterically hindered reactive centres should not be used, as these properties do not favour the reduction of the carbonyl to form an imine and increases the chance that other functional groups will be reduced instead.

=== Sodium cyanoborohydride ===
Sodium cyanoborohydride (NaBH_{3}CN) is soluble in hydroxylic solvents, stable in acidic solutions, and has different selectivities depending on the pH. At low pH values, it efficiently reduces aldehydes and ketones. As the pH increases, the reduction rate slows and instead, the imine intermediate becomes preferential for reduction. For this reason, NaBH_{3}CN is an ideal reducing agent for one-pot direct reductive amination reactions that don't isolate the intermediate imine.

When used as a reducing agent, NaBH_{3}CN can release toxic by-products like HCN and NaCN during work up.

=== Sodium triacetoxyborohydride ===
Sodium triacetoxyborohydride (STAB, NaBH(OAc)_{3}) is a common reducing agent for reductive aminations. STAB selectively reduces the imine intermediate formed through dehydration of the molecule. STAB is a weaker reductant than NaBH_{4}, and can preferentially reduce the imine group in the presence of other reduction-sensitive functional groups. While STAB has also been reported as a selective reducing agent for aldehydes in the presence of keto groups, standard reductive amination reaction conditions greatly favour imine reduction to form an amine.

Physical and Chemical Characteristics of Common Reducing Agents
	H_{2}/Pd	NaBH_{4}	NaBH(OAc) _{3}	NaBH_{3}CN	CO/Rh
Selectivity	Low	Low	High	High	High
Atom economy	High	Solid wastes	Solid wastes	Solid wastes	High
Work up	Required	Not required	Not required	Not required	Required
Flammability	High	Low	High	High	High
Sensitivity to H_{2}O, O_{2}	Low	High	High	High	Low
Toxicity	None	High, Carcinogen	Low	High	High

== Variations and related reactions ==
The reductive amination reaction is related to the Eschweiler–Clarke reaction, in which amines are methylated to tertiary amines, the Leuckart–Wallach reaction, and other amine alkylation methods such as the Mannich reaction and Petasis reaction.

A classic named reaction is the Mignonac reaction (1921) involving reaction of a ketone with ammonia over a nickel catalyst. An example of this reaction is the synthesis of 1-phenylethylamine from acetophenone:

Reductive amination acetophenone ammonia

Additionally, many systems catalyze reductive aminations with hydrogenation catalysts. Generally, catalysis is preferred to stoichiometric reactions as they may improve reaction efficiency and atom economy, and produce less waste. These reactions can utilize homogeneous or heterogeneous catalyst systems. These systems provide alternative synthesis routes which are efficient, require fewer volatile reagents and are redox-economical. As well, this method can be used in the reduction of alcohols, along with aldehydes and ketones to form the amine product. One example of a heterogeneous catalytic system is the Ni-catalyzed reductive amination of alcohols. Nickel is commonly used as a catalyst for reductive amination because of its abundance and relatively good catalytic activity.

First, the nickel metal dehydrogenates the alcohol to form a ketone and Ni-H complex. Then, the ketone reacts with ammonia to form an imine. Finally, the imine reacts with Ni-H to regenerate catalyst and form primary amine.

An example of a homogeneous catalytic system is the reductive amination of ketones done with an iridium catalyst. Homogenous Iridium (III) catalysts have been shown to be effective in the reductive amination of carboxylic acids, which in the past has been more difficult than aldehydes and ketones. Homogeneous catalysts are often favored because they are more environmentally and economically friendly compared to most heterogeneous systems.

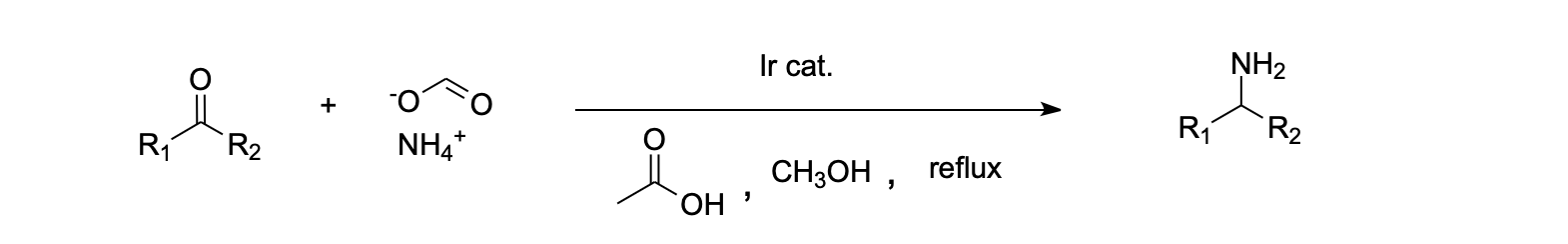
Ketone reacting with ammonium formate, catalyzed by iridium catalyst, to form primary amine.

In industry, tertiary amines such as triethylamine and diisopropylethylamine are formed directly from ketones with a gaseous mixture of ammonia and hydrogen and a suitable catalyst.

== In green chemistry ==
Reductive amination is commonly used over other methods for introducing amines to alkyl substrates, such as SN2-type reactions with halides, since it can be done in mild conditions and has high selectivity for nitrogen-containing compounds. Reductive amination can occur sequentially in one-pot reactions, which eliminates the need for intermediate purifications and reduces waste. Some multistep synthetic pathways have been reduced to one step through one-pot reductive amination. This makes it a highly appealing method to produce amines in green chemistry.

== Biochemistry ==
In biochemistry, dehydrogenase enzymes can catalyze the reductive amination of α-keto acids and ammonia to yield α-amino acids. Reductive amination is predominantly used for the synthesis of the amino acid glutamate starting from α-ketoglutarate, while biochemistry largely relies on transamination to introduce nitrogen in the other amino acids. The use of enzymes as a catalyst is advantageous because the enzyme active sites are often stereospecific and have the ability to selectively synthesize a certain enantiomer. This is useful in the pharmaceutical industry, particularly for drug-development, because enantiomer pairs can have different reactivities in the body. Additionally, enzyme biocatalysts are often quite selective in reactivity so they can be used in the presence of other functional groups, without the use of protecting groups. For instance a class of enzymes called imine reductases, IREDs, can be used to catalyze direct asymmetric reductive amination to form chiral amines.

== In popular culture ==
In the critically acclaimed drama Breaking Bad, main character Walter White uses the reductive amination reaction to produce his high purity methamphetamine, relying on phenyl-2-propanone and methylamine.

== See also ==
- Forster–Decker method
- Leuckart reaction
