= D-amino-acid transaminase =

D-alanine transaminase

Identifiers
- EC no.: 2.6.1.21
- CAS no.: 37277-85-3

Databases
- IntEnz: IntEnz view
- BRENDA: BRENDA entry
- ExPASy: NiceZyme view
- KEGG: KEGG entry
- MetaCyc: metabolic pathway
- PRIAM: profile
- PDB structures: RCSB PDB PDBe PDBsum
- Gene Ontology: AmiGO / QuickGO
Search
- PMC: articles
- PubMed: articles
- NCBI: proteins

D-amino-acid transaminase (EC 2.6.1.21) is an enzyme originally characterised from bacteria that catalyzes several reversible chemical reactions that interconvert specific D-amino acids and α-ketoglutaric acid with the corresponding α-keto acid and D-glutamic acid. For example, it can use D-alanine as a substrate:

D-alanine
+
α-ketoglutaric acid
pyruvic acid
+
D-glutamic acid

In some organisms, the enzyme can use alternative keto acids instead of α-ketoglutaric acid. It has been found in pea, and the genes coding for the enzyme have been studied in Bacillus sphaericus.

This enzyme belongs to the family of transferases, specifically the transaminases, which transfer nitrogenous groups. The systematic name of this enzyme class is D-alanine:2-oxoglutarate aminotransferase. Other names in common use include D-aspartate transaminase, D-alanine aminotransferase, D-aspartic aminotransferase, D-alanine-D-glutamate transaminase, D-alanine transaminase, and D-amino acid aminotransferase. This enzyme participates in 6 metabolic pathways: lysine degradation, arginine and proline metabolism, phenylalanine metabolism, D-arginine and D-ornithine metabolism, D-alanine metabolism, and peptidoglycan biosynthesis. It employs one cofactor, pyridoxal phosphate.

== Structural studies ==
As of late 2007, 8 structures have been solved for this class of enzymes, with PDB accession codes 1A0G, 1DAA, 1G2W, 2DAA, 2DAB, 3DAA, 4DAA, and 5DAA.
