= De Barsy syndrome =

- Other names: Cutis laxa-corneal clouding-intellectual disability syndrome
- De Barsy syndrome is inherited in an autosomal recessive manner.
- Usual onset: Infancy

De Barsy syndrome is a rare autosomal recessive genetic disorder. Symptoms include cutis laxa (loose hanging skin) as well as other eye, musculoskeletal, and neurological abnormalities. It is usually progressive, manifesting side effects that can include clouded corneas, cataracts, short stature, dystonia, or progeria (premature aging).

Alternative names for De Barsy syndrome include cutis laxa-corneal clouding-intellectual disability syndrome, cutis laxa-growth deficiency syndrome, De Barsy–Moens–Diercks syndrome, and progeroid syndrome of De Barsy.

== Signs and symptoms ==
Infants have the characteristic wrinkled, inelastic skin. Their abdomens and upper side of their hands and feet have visible veins. Their growth and development are affected. There are issues with cognitive function and speech. They may later have issues with hypermobility of joints, dislocation of their hips, foot deformity and scoliosis.

Children may have prematurely aged skin; the middle of their face have underdeveloped structure and skin. Infants may have widely spaced eyes, a prominent forehead, a small, upturned nose, large, malformed ears, and widely spaced eyes. Because of the rarity of the syndrome, there are no precise prevalence or incidence statistics.

Other reported features may include: intrauterine growth restriction, microcephaly, sutural bones, stiffness/mobility issues with fingers, cataract/corneal clouding.

== Genetics ==
It was first described in 1967 by De Barsy et al. and, as of 2011, there have been 27 cases reported worldwide. The genes that cause De Barsy syndrome have not been identified yet, although several studies have narrowed down the symptoms' cause. A study by Reversade et al. (2009) has shown that recessive mutations in PYCR1 or ALD18A1, the genetic sequences that codes for mitochondrial enzymes that synthesize L-proline, are prevalent in cases of autosomal recessive cutis laxa (ARCL), a condition very similar to De Barsy syndrome. A study by Leao-Teles et al. has shown that De Barsy syndrome may be related to mutations in ATP6V0A2 gene, known as ATP6V0A2-CDG by the new naming system.

Alternative names for De Barsy syndrome include cutis laxa-corneal clouding-intellectual disability syndrome, cutis laxa-growth deficiency syndrome, De Barsy–Moens–Diercks syndrome, and progeroid syndrome of De Barsy.

== Diagnosis ==
Individuals are diagnosed by recognition symptoms, a thorough patient history, laboratory tests and clinical evaluation. Tests include a biopsy of the skin looking for differences in elastic fibers. Diagnosis may include molecular genetic testing. In individuals with a suspected ALDH18A1-related cases, screening for a specific purine synthesis defect could be included.

There is a focus on treating and individual's symptoms. Interprofessional care is needed and families may need multiple specialists providing care for their child. Genetic counseling and psycho-social support can also help families.

=== Differential diagnoses ===
There are diseases that are like De Barsy syndrome which could be considered in any diagnosis. Examples include cutis laxa disorders, Ehlers–Danlos syndrome, and pseudoxanthoma elasticum.

== Treatment ==
Individuals with de Barsy syndrome often need multiple surgeries. Surgeries are often needed to treat skeletal, eye, or hernia issues. Skin issues may be improved with plastic surgery. Medications may be prescribed to individuals with ALDH18A1-related de Barsy syndrome. Children with De Barsy syndrome can be helped with physical therapy and early developmental intervention.
