= Hydroxyaminovaleric acid =

Names
- Other names 5-Hydroxynorvaline

Identifiers
CAS Number	533-88-0; 6152-89-2 L-enantiomer
3D model (JSmol)	Interactive image
ChEBI	CHEBI:165867
ChemSpider	86255
PubChem CID	95562
UNII	PKG8I0M67E
CompTox Dashboard (EPA)	DTXSID901315938
- InChI: InChI=1S/C5H11NO3/c6-4(5(8)9)2-1-3-7/h4,7H,1-3,6H2,(H,8,9) Key: CZWARROQQFCFJB-UHFFFAOYSA-N
- SMILES: C(CC(C(=O)O)N)CO

Properties
Chemical formula	C_{5}H_{11}NO_{3}
Molar mass	133.147 g·mol^{−1}
Appearance	white solid
Melting point	218–220 °C (424–428 °F; 491–493 K) 224 °C for L-enantiomer
- Except where otherwise noted, data are given for materials in their standard state (at 25 °C [77 °F], 100 kPa). Infobox references

Hydroxyaminovaleric acid (HAVA) is the organic compound with the formula HOCH_{2}(CH_{2})_{3}CH(NH_{2})CO_{2}H. A white solid, it is a rarely encountered amino acid. It is also produced by reduction of glutamate-5-semialdehyde residues followed by proteolysis.
