= Amino acid kinase domain =

AA_kinase
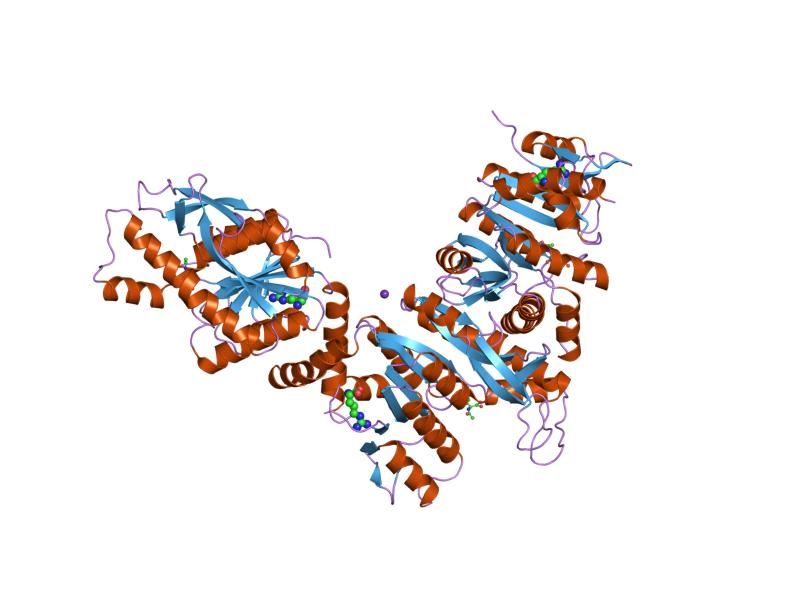
- acetylglutamate kinase from thermotoga maritima complexed with its inhibitor arginine

Identifiers
- Symbol: AA_kinase
- Pfam: PF00696
- InterPro: IPR001048
- PROSITE: PDOC00289
- SCOP2: 1e19 / SCOPe / SUPFAM
Available protein structures:
- PDB: IPR001048 PF00696 (ECOD; PDBsum)
- AlphaFold: IPR001048; PF00696

In molecular biology, the amino acid kinase domain is a protein domain. It is found in protein kinases with various specificities, including the aspartate, glutamate and uridylate kinase families. In prokaryotes and plants the synthesis of the essential amino acids lysine and threonine is predominantly regulated by feed-back inhibition of aspartate kinase (AK) and dihydrodipicolinate synthase (DHPS). In Escherichia coli, thrA, metLM, and lysC encode aspartokinase isozymes that show feedback inhibition by threonine, methionine, and lysine, respectively. The lysine-sensitive isoenzyme of aspartate kinase from spinach leaves has a subunit composition of 4 large and 4 small subunits.

In plants although the control of carbon fixation and nitrogen assimilation has been studied in detail, relatively little is known about the regulation of carbon and nitrogen flow into amino acids. The metabolic regulation of expression of an Arabidopsis thaliana aspartate kinase/homoserine dehydrogenase (AK/HSD) gene, which encodes two linked key enzymes in the biosynthetic pathway of aspartate family amino acids has been studied. The conversion of aspartate into either the storage amino acid asparagine or aspartate family amino acids may be subject to a coordinated, reciprocal metabolic control, and this biochemical branch point is a part of a larger, coordinated regulatory mechanism of nitrogen and carbon storage and utilization.
