= PYCR1 =

Protein-coding gene in the species Homo sapiens

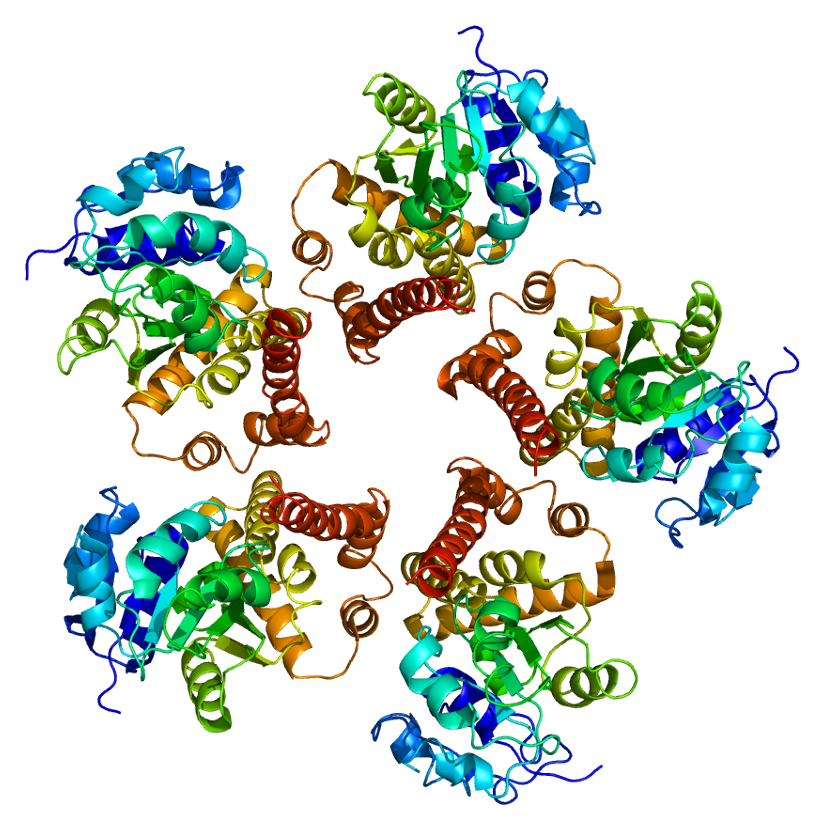

Identifiers
- Aliases: PYCR1, ARCL2B, ARCL3B, P5C, P5CR, PIG45, PP222, PRO3, PYCR, pyrroline-5-carboxylate reductase 1
- External IDs: OMIM: 179035; MGI: 2384795; GeneCards: PYCR1
Available structures
PDB	Ortholog search: PDBe RCSB
PDB	List of PDB id codes 2GER, 2GR9, 2GRA, 2IZZ
Enzyme activity
EC #	BRENDA	ExPASy	KEGG	MetaCyc
1.5.1.2	↗	↗	↗	↗

Gene location (Human)
Chr.	Chromosome 17 (human)
Band	17q25.3	Start	81,932,384 bp
Band	17q25.3	End	81,942,412 bp

Gene location (Mouse)
Chr.	Chromosome 11 (mouse)
Band	11|11 E2	Start	120,635,712 bp
Band	11|11 E2	End	120,643,769 bp
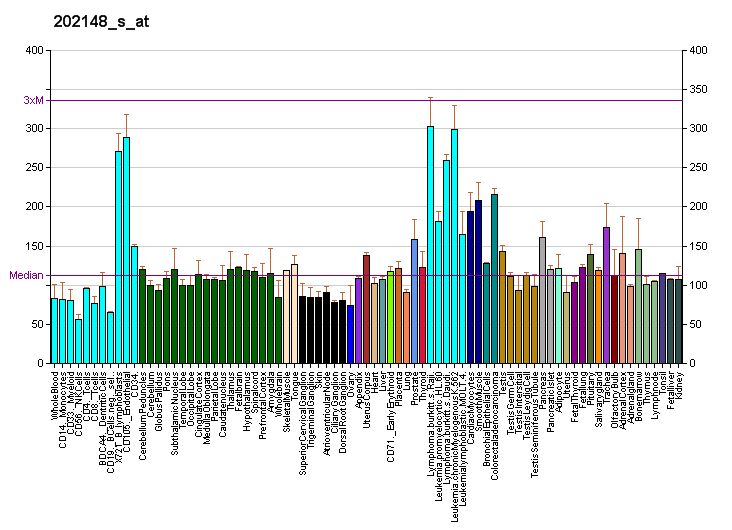
RNA expression pattern
Bgee	Human / Mouse (ortholog); Top expressed in: stromal cell of endometrium; body of pancreas; parotid gland; ventricular zone; mucosa of transverse colon; pancreatic ductal cell; embryo; ganglionic eminence; tibia; minor salivary glands / Top expressed in: parotid gland; lacrimal gland; clavicle; calvaria; molar; seminal vesicula; body of femur; internal carotid artery; external carotid artery; fossa; More reference expression data
BioGPS	More reference expression data
Gene ontology
Molecular function	oxidoreductase activity; protein binding; pyrroline-5-carboxylate reductase activity; identical protein binding
Cellular component	mitochondrial matrix; mitochondrion
Biological process	regulation of mitochondrial membrane potential; cellular response to oxidative stress; negative regulation of hydrogen peroxide-induced cell death; cellular amino acid biosynthetic process; L-proline biosynthetic process; proline biosynthetic process
Sources:Amigo / QuickGO
Orthologs
Databases	NCBI: entry; OMA: entry
Species	Human	Mouse
Entrez	5831	209027
Ensembl	ENSG00000183010	ENSMUSG00000025140
UniProt	P32322	Q922W5
RefSeq (mRNA)	NM_001282279; NM_001282280; NM_001282281; NM_006907; NM_153824 NM_001330523	NM_144795; NM_001348222
RefSeq (protein)	NP_001269208; NP_001269209; NP_001269210; NP_001317452; NP_008838 NP_722546	NP_001335151; NP_001366014; NP_001366015; NP_001366016; NP_001366017 NP_001366018
Location (UCSC)	Chr 17: 81.93 – 81.94 Mb	Chr 11: 120.64 – 120.64 Mb
PubMed search
- Wikidata
View/Edit Human	View/Edit Mouse

Pyrroline-5-carboxylate reductase 1, mitochondrial is an enzyme that in humans is encoded by the PYCR1 gene.

This gene encodes an enzyme that catalyzes the NAD(P)H-dependent conversion of pyrroline-5-carboxylate to proline. This enzyme may also play a physiologic role in the generation of NADP(+) in some cell types. The protein forms a homopolymer and localizes to the mitochondrion. Alternate splicing results in two transcript variants encoding different isoforms. As reported by Bruno Reversade and colleagues, PYCR1 deficiency in humans causes a progeroid disease known as De Barsy Syndrome mainly affecting connective tissues with dermis thinning and bone fragility.
