= Ornithine cyclodeaminase =

ornithine cyclodeaminase

Identifiers
- EC no.: 4.3.1.12
- CAS no.: 9054-76-6

Databases
- IntEnz: IntEnz view
- BRENDA: BRENDA entry
- ExPASy: NiceZyme view
- KEGG: KEGG entry
- MetaCyc: metabolic pathway
- PRIAM: profile
- PDB structures: RCSB PDB PDBe PDBsum
- Gene Ontology: AmiGO / QuickGO
Search
- PMC: articles
- PubMed: articles
- NCBI: proteins

The enzyme ornithine cyclodeaminase (EC 4.3.1.12) catalyzes the chemical reaction

L-ornithine $\rightleftharpoons$ L-proline + NH_{4}^{+}

This enzyme belongs to the family of lyases, specifically ammonia lyases, which cleave carbon-nitrogen bonds. The systematic name of this enzyme class is Lornithine ammonia-lyase (cyclizing; L-proline-forming). Other names in common use include ornithine cyclase, ornithine cyclase (deaminating), and L-ornithine ammonia-lyase (cyclizing). This enzyme participates in arginine and proline biosynthesis. It employs one cofactor, NAD^{+}.

== Structural studies ==
As of late 2007, two structures have been solved for this class of enzymes, with PDB accession codes 1U7H and 1X7D.
