= Arginine and proline metabolism =

Arginine and proline metabolism is one of the central pathways for the biosynthesis of the amino acids arginine and proline from glutamate. The pathways linking arginine, glutamate, and proline are bidirectional. Thus, the net utilization or production of these amino acids is highly dependent on cell type and developmental stage. Altered proline metabolism has been linked to metastasis formation in breast cancer.

== Reactions ==
Proline is biosynthetically derived from the amino acid L-glutamate. Glutamate-5-semialdehyde is first formed by glutamate 5-kinase (ATP-dependent) and glutamate-5-semialdehyde dehydrogenase (which requires NADH or NADPH). This can then either spontaneously cyclize to form 1-pyrroline-5-carboxylic acid, which is reduced to proline by pyrroline-5-carboxylate reductase (using NADH or NADPH), or turned into ornithine by ornithine aminotransferase, followed by cyclisation by ornithine cyclodeaminase to form proline.

Citrulline is made from ornithine and carbamoyl phosphate by ornithine carbamoyltransferase. Arginine is then synthesized from citrulline in the urea cycle by the sequential action of the cytosolic enzymes argininosuccinate synthetase (ASS) and argininosuccinate lyase (ASL).
