= Proline (data page) =

Chemical data page

The complete data for Proline
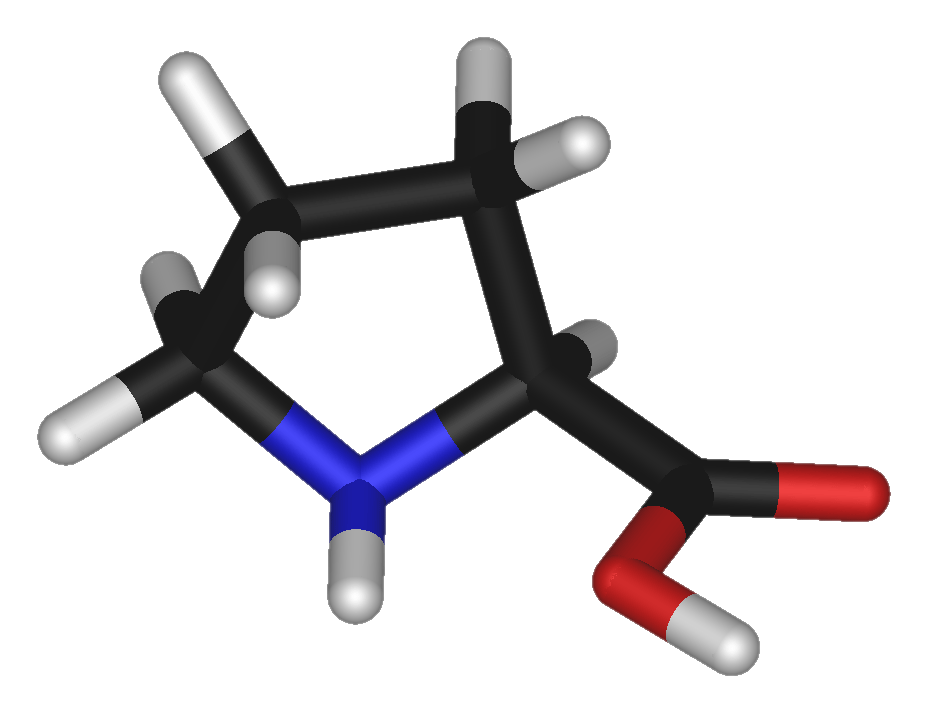
General information
Chemical formula: C_{5}H_{9}NO_{2}
Molar mass: 115.13 g·mol^{−1}
Systematic name:
(S)-Pyrrolidine-2-carboxylic acid
Abbreviations: P, Pro
Synonyms:
?
Database data
SMILES: C1CCNC1C(=O)O
InChI=1/C5H9NO2/c7-5(8)4-2-1-3-6-4/h4,6H,1-3H2,(H,7,8)/t4-/m1/s1/f/h7H

ATC: N/A	CAS: 147-85-3	DrugBank: N/A	EINECS: 205-702-2 ^{a}	PubChem: 614 (L) ^{a}, 8988 (D)^{a}

Physical properties

Structure	Crystal data	Spectral data: UV-Vis / IR / NMR / MS: Masses of main fragments: GMD MS Spectrum

Phase behavior	Solid properties T_{m}: 221 °C	Liquid properties	Gas properties

Hazard properties

MSDS N/A	Main hazards: N/A	NFPA 704	Flash point: N/A	RTECS number: N/A

Chemical properties

XLogP: -0.04	pI: 6.30	pK_{a}: 1.95, 10.47	Tautomers:	Hydrogen bond: donor - 2; acceptor - 3

Pharmacological properties

This box:
- Except where noted otherwise, data relate to Standard temperature and pressure.
- Reliability of data general note.
