= Pyrroline-5-carboxylate reductase =

pyrroline-5-carboxylate reductase
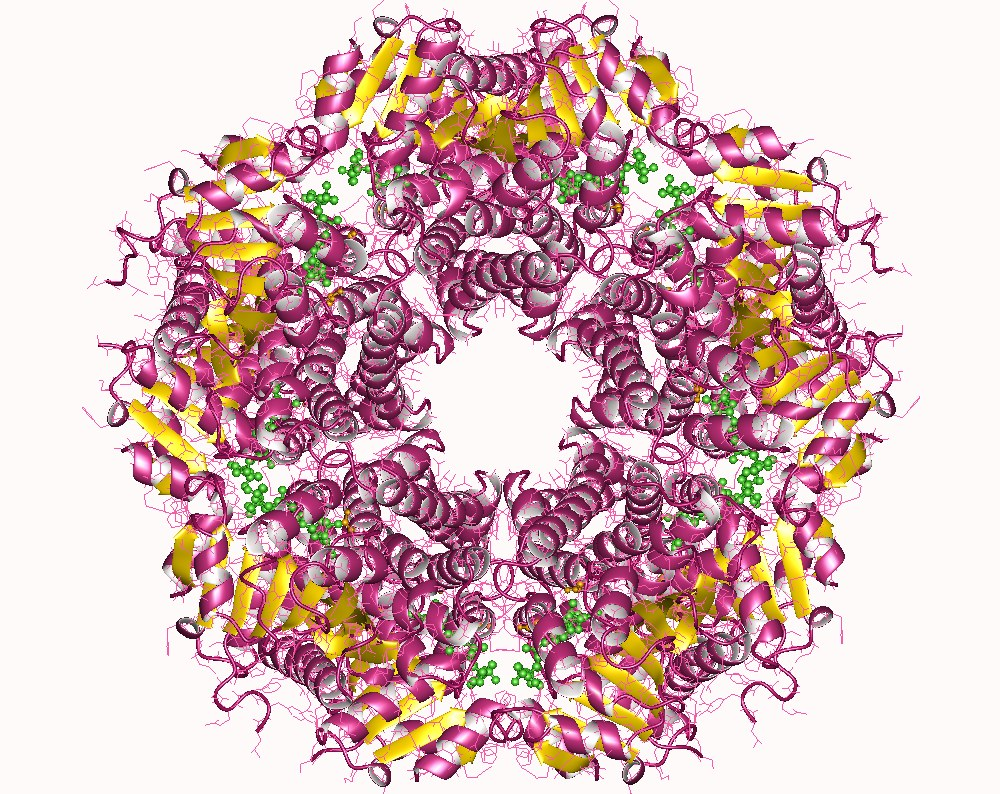
- Pyrroline-5-carboxylate reductase 1 decamer, Human

Identifiers
- EC no.: 1.5.1.2
- CAS no.: 9029-17-8

Databases
- IntEnz: IntEnz view
- BRENDA: BRENDA entry
- ExPASy: NiceZyme view
- KEGG: KEGG entry
- MetaCyc: metabolic pathway
- PRIAM: profile
- PDB structures: RCSB PDB PDBe PDBsum
- Gene Ontology: AmiGO / QuickGO
Search
- PMC: articles
- PubMed: articles
- NCBI: proteins

In enzymology, pyrroline-5-carboxylate reductase (EC 1.5.1.2) is an enzyme that catalyzes the chemical reaction

(S)-1-pyrroline-5-carboxylic acid
+ NADH
H^{+}
H^{+}
L-proline
+ NAD^{+}

The three substrates of this enzyme are (S)-1-pyrroline-5-carboxylic acid, reduced nicotinamide adenine dinucleotide (NADH), and a proton. Its products are L-proline and oxidised (NAD^{+}). Nicotinamide adenine dinucleotide phosphate can be used as an alternative cofactor.

This enzyme belongs to the family of oxidoreductases, specifically those acting on the CH-NH group of donors with NAD+ or NADP+ as acceptor. The systematic name of this enzyme class is L-proline:NAD(P)+ 5-oxidoreductase. Other names in common use include proline oxidase, L-proline oxidase, 1-pyrroline-5-carboxylate reductase, NADPH-L-Delta1-pyrroline carboxylic acid reductase, and L-proline-NAD(P)+ 5-oxidoreductase. This enzyme participates in arginine and proline metabolism.

== Structural studies ==
As of late 2007, 5 structures have been solved for this class of enzymes, with PDB accession codes 2AHR, 2GER, 2GR9, 2GRA, and 2IZZ.

== Human genes ==
- PYCR1, nuclear gene for mitochondrial protein
- PYCR2, nuclear gene for mitochondrial protein
- PYCR3 (formerly PYCRL), cytosolic protein
