= Glutamate 5-kinase =

Enzyme

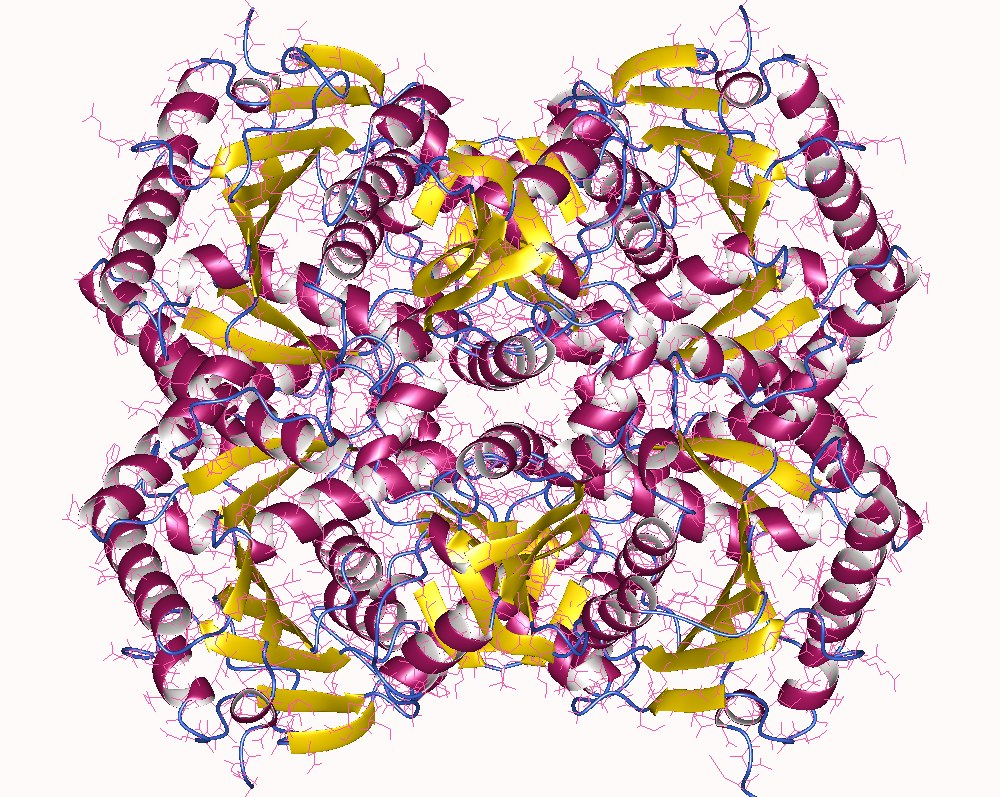
- Glutamate 5-kinase tetramer, Burkholderia thailandensis

Identifiers
- EC no.: 2.7.2.11
- CAS no.: 54596-30-4

Databases
- IntEnz: IntEnz view
- BRENDA: BRENDA entry
- ExPASy: NiceZyme view
- KEGG: KEGG entry
- MetaCyc: metabolic pathway
- PRIAM: profile
- PDB structures: RCSB PDB PDBe PDBsum
- Gene Ontology: AmiGO / QuickGO
Search
- PMC: articles
- PubMed: articles
- NCBI: proteins

Glutamate 5-kinase (EC 2.7.2.11) is an enzyme that catalyzes the chemical reaction

L-glutamic acid
ATP
ADP
ATP
ADP
L-γ-glutamyl phosphate

The enzyme characterised from Escherichia coli, converts L-glutamic acid, to L-γ-glutamyl phosphate by transferring a phosphate group from the cofactor, adenosine triphosphate (ATP), which is converted to adenosine diphosphate (ADP). The reaction is part of the biosynthesis of the amino acid, proline.

The product can spontaneously cyclise to (S)-pyroglutamic acid by loss of the phosphate group (P_{i}):

L-γ-glutamyl phosphate
P_{i}
(S)-pyroglutamic acid

This enzyme is a transferase, specifically one transferring phosphorus-containing groups (phosphotransferases) with a carboxy group as acceptor. The systematic name of this enzyme class is ATP:L-glutamate 5-phosphotransferase. Other names in common use include ATP-L-glutamate 5-phosphotransferase, ATP:gamma-L-glutamate phosphotransferase, gamma-glutamate kinase, gamma-glutamyl kinase, and glutamate kinase.

== Structural studies ==
As of late 2007, 3 structures have been solved for this class of enzymes, with PDB accession codes PDB: 2AKO, PDB: 2J5T, and PDB: 2J5V.
