= Glutamate-5-semialdehyde =

Names
- IUPAC name (2S)-2-Amino-5-oxopentanoic acid
- Other names L-Glutamate gamma-semialdehyde; gamma-Glutamyl semialdehyde

Identifiers
| CAS Number | 2886-91-1 |
| 3D model (JSmol) | Interactive image |
| ChEBI | CHEBI:17232 |
| ChemSpider | 167744 |
| DrugBank | DB04388 |
| KEGG | C01165 |
| PubChem CID | 193305 |
| UNII | B517ZPX7HX |
| CompTox Dashboard (EPA) | DTXSID601031870 |
- InChI: InChI=1S/C5H9NO3/c6-4(5(8)9)2-1-3-7/h3-4H,1-2,6H2,(H,8,9)/t4-/m0/s1 Key: KABXUUFDPUOJMW-BYPYZUCNSA-N
- SMILES: C(C[C@@H](C(=O)O)N)C=O

Properties
| Chemical formula | C_{5}H_{9}NO_{3} |
| Molar mass | 131.131 g·mol^{−1} |
- Except where otherwise noted, data are given for materials in their standard state (at 25 °C [77 °F], 100 kPa). Infobox references

Glutamate-5-semialdehyde is a non-proteinogenic amino acid involved in both the biosynthesis and degradation of proline and arginine (via ornithine), as well as in the biosynthesis of antibiotics, such as carbapenems. It is synthesized by the reduction of glutamyl-5-phosphate by glutamate-5-semialdehyde dehydrogenase. In solution in water, the aldehyde is in chemical equilibrium with (S)-1-pyrroline-5-carboxylic acid and this is the form in which many of its biochemical reactions occur.

L-glutamate-5-semialdehyde
(S)-1-pyrroline-5-carboxylic acid

Reduction of glutamic acid semialdehyde with sodium borohydride gives hydroxyaminovaleric acid.

== See also ==
- Glutamate-1-semialdehyde
