= Glutamate-5-semialdehyde dehydrogenase =

Chemical Enzyme

glutamate-5-semialdehyde dehydrogenase

Identifiers
- EC no.: 1.2.1.41
- CAS no.: 54596-29-1

Databases
- IntEnz: IntEnz view
- BRENDA: BRENDA entry
- ExPASy: NiceZyme view
- KEGG: KEGG entry
- MetaCyc: metabolic pathway
- PRIAM: profile
- PDB structures: RCSB PDB PDBe PDBsum
- Gene Ontology: AmiGO / QuickGO
Search
- PMC: articles
- PubMed: articles
- NCBI: proteins

In enzymology, glutamate-5-semialdehyde dehydrogenase (EC 1.2.1.41) is an enzyme that catalyzes the chemical reaction

L-glutamate-5-semialdehyde
+ NADP^{+}
P_{i}
H^{+}
P_{i}
H^{+}
L-γ-glutamyl phosphate
+ NADPH

The three substrates of this enzyme are L-glutamate-5-semialdehyde, oxidised nicotinamide adenine dinucleotide phosphate (NADP^{+}) and phosphate (P_{i}). Its products are L-γ-glutamyl phosphate, reduced NADPH, and a proton.

This enzyme belongs to the family of oxidoreductases, specifically those acting on the aldehyde or oxo group of donor with NAD+ or NADP+ as acceptor. The systematic name of this enzyme class is L-glutamate-5-semialdehyde:NADP+ 5-oxidoreductase (phosphorylating). Other names in common use include beta-glutamylphosphate reductase, gamma-glutamyl phosphate reductase, beta-glutamylphosphate reductase, glutamate semialdehyde dehydrogenase, and glutamate-gamma-semialdehyde dehydrogenase. This enzyme participates in urea cycle and metabolism of amino groups.

== Structural studies ==
As of late 2007, 3 structures have been solved for this class of enzymes, with PDB accession codes 1O20, 1VLU, and 2H5G.
