= 1-Pyrroline-5-carboxylic acid =

1-pyrroline-5-carboxylic acid

Names
- Preferred IUPAC name 3,4-Dihydro-2H-pyrrole-2-carboxylic acid
- Other names 1-Pyrroline-5-carboxylic acid δ-1-Pyrroline-5-carboxylic acid P5C

Identifiers
CAS Number	2906-39-0
3D model (JSmol)	Interactive image; Interactive image
ChEBI	CHEBI:1372
ChEMBL	ChEMBL1161508
ChemSpider	1159
KEGG	C04322
MeSH	Delta-1-pyrroline-5-carboxylate
PubChem CID	1196
UNII	52TNU46DHL
CompTox Dashboard (EPA)	DTXSID00863056
- InChI: InChI=1S/C5H7NO2/c7-5(8)4-2-1-3-6-4/h3-4H,1-2H2,(H,7,8) Key: DWAKNKKXGALPNW-UHFFFAOYSA-N; InChI=1/C5H7NO2/c7-5(8)4-2-1-3-6-4/h3-4H,1-2H2,(H,7,8) Key: DWAKNKKXGALPNW-UHFFFAOYAB
- SMILES: C1CC(N=C1)C(=O)O; O=C(O)C1/N=C\CC1

Properties
Chemical formula	C_{5}H_{7}NO_{2}
Molar mass	113.115 g/mol
Acidity (pK_{a})	1.82/6.07
- Except where otherwise noted, data are given for materials in their standard state (at 25 °C [77 °F], 100 kPa). verify (what is ?) Infobox references

1-Pyrroline-5-carboxylic acid (systematic name 3,4-dihydro-2H-pyrrole-2-carboxylic acid) is a cyclic imino acid. Its conjugate base and anion is 1-pyrroline-5-carboxylate (P5C). In solution, P5C is in spontaneous equilibrium with glutamate-5-semialdehyde (GSA).

== Biochemistry ==
The stereoisomer (S)-1-pyrroline-5-carboxylate (also referred to as L-P5C) is an intermediate metabolite in the biosynthesis and degradation of proline and arginine.

In prokaryotic proline biosynthesis, GSA is synthesized from γ-glutamyl phosphate by the enzyme γ-glutamyl phosphate reductase.

L-γ-glutamyl phosphate
+ NADPH
H^{+}
P_{i}
H^{+}
P_{i}
L-glutamate-5-semialdehyde
+ NADP^{+}

In most eukaryotes, GSA is synthesised from the amino acid glutamate by the bifunctional enzyme 1-pyrroline-5-carboxylate synthase (P5CS). The human P5CS is encoded by the ALDH18A1 gene. The enzyme pyrroline-5-carboxylate reductase converts L-P5C into proline.

L-P5C
+ NADH
H^{+}
H^{+}
L-proline
+ NAD^{+}

In proline degradation, the enzyme proline dehydrogenase produces P5C from proline, and the enzyme 1-pyrroline-5-carboxylate dehydrogenase converts GSA to glutamate. In many prokaryotes, proline dehydrogenase and P5C dehydrogenase form a bifunctional enzyme that prevents the release of P5C during proline degradation.

A reciprocal regulation of delta 1-pyrroline-5-carboxylate synthetase (P5CS) and proline dehydrogenase genes controls proline levels during and after osmotic stress in plants proportional to the level of proline. This allows an optimum level of proline to be produced from reduced nitrogen to control osmotic stress.
