= Proline =

Structural formula of proline

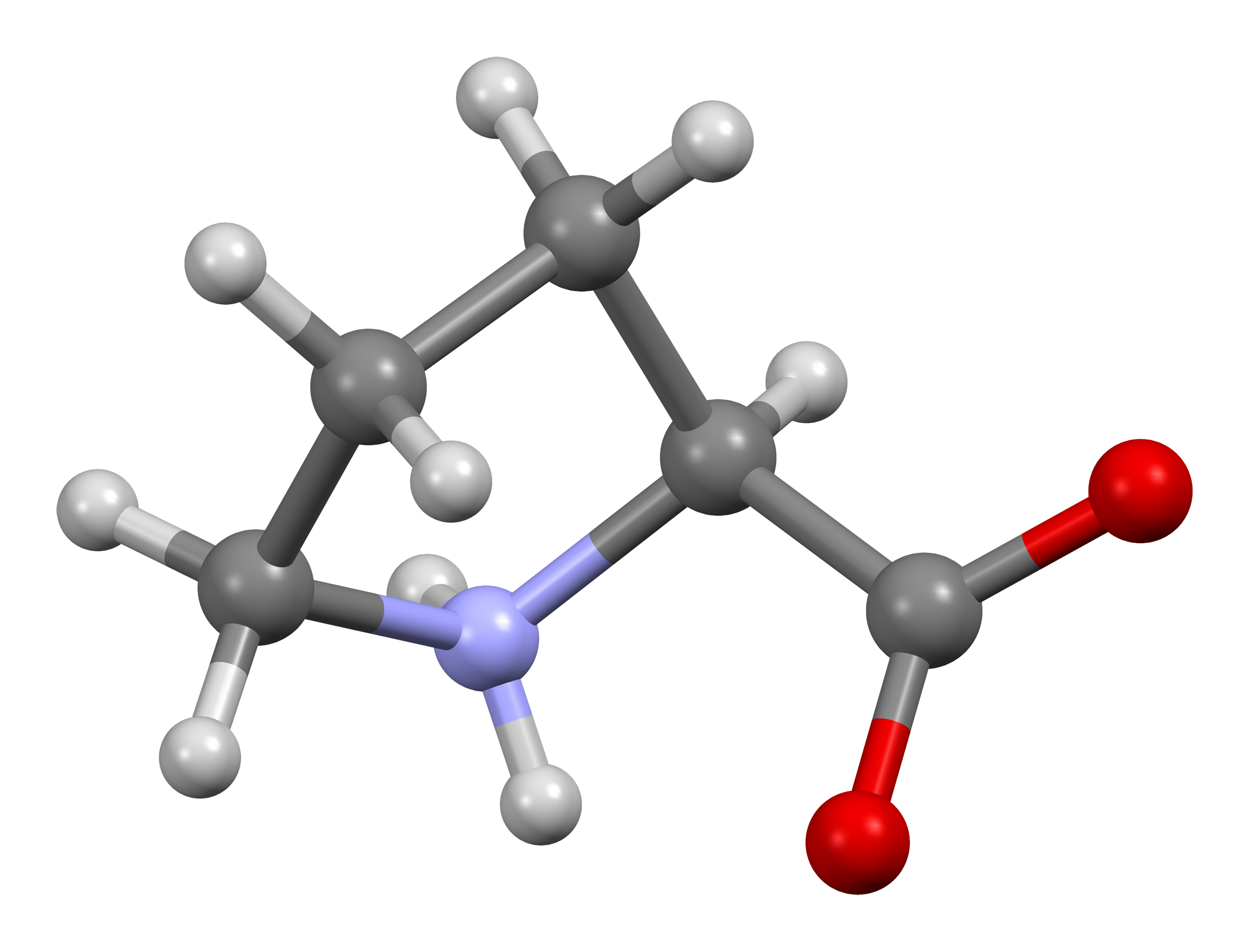
ball-and-stick model
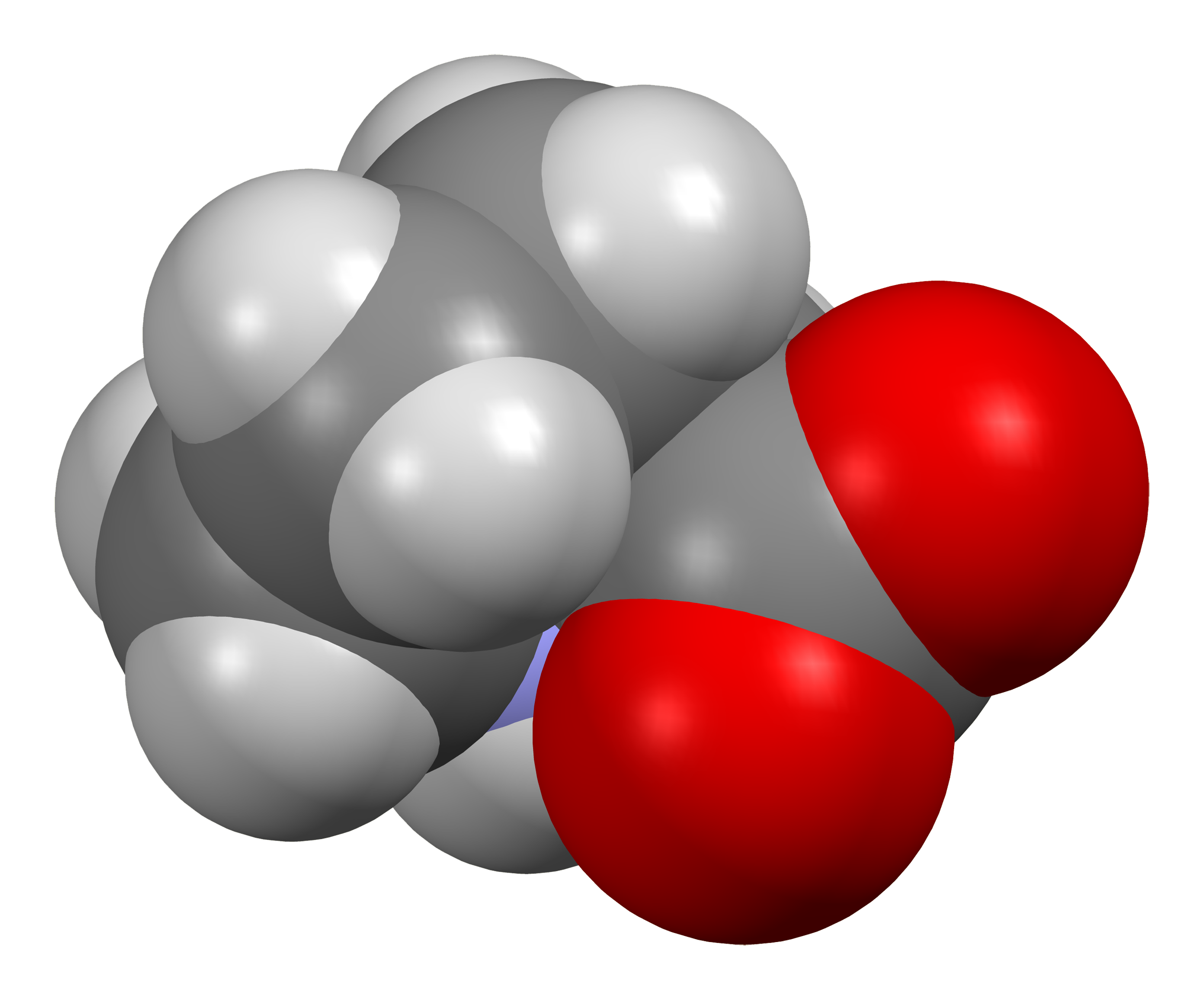
space-filling model

Names
- IUPAC name Proline
- Systematic IUPAC name Pyrrolidine-2-carboxylic acid

Identifiers
| CAS Number | L: 147-85-3; D/L: 609-36-9; D: 344-25-2 |
| 3D model (JSmol) | L: Interactive image; L Zwitterion: Interactive image |
| Beilstein Reference | 80812 |
| ChEBI | L: CHEBI:17203; D/L: CHEBI:26271; D: CHEBI:16313 |
| ChEMBL | L: ChEMBL72275 |
| ChemSpider | L: 128566; D/L: 594; D: 8640 |
| DrugBank | L: DB00172 |
| ECHA InfoCard | 100.009.264 |
| EC Number | L: 210-189-3 |
| Gmelin Reference | 26927 |
| KEGG | L: C00148 |
| MeSH | Proline |
| PubChem CID | L: 145742; D/L: 614; D: 8988 |
| RTECS number | L: TW3584000 |
| UNII | L: 9DLQ4CIU6V; D/L: DCS9E77JPQ; D: L01Q4LGZ5L |
| CompTox Dashboard (EPA) | L: DTXSID9041104 |
- InChI: InChI=1S/C5H9NO2/c7-5(8)4-2-1-3-6-4/h4,6H,1-3H2,(H,7,8)/t4-/m0/s1 Key: ONIBWKKTOPOVIA-BYPYZUCNSA-N; D/L: Key: ONIBWKKTOPOVIA-UHFFFAOYSA-N; D: Key: ONIBWKKTOPOVIA-SCSAIBSYSA-N
- SMILES: L: C1C[C@H](NC1)C(=O)O; L Zwitterion: [O-]C(=O)[C@H](CCC2)[NH2+]2

Properties
| Chemical formula | C_{5}H_{9}NO_{2} |
| Molar mass | 115.132 g·mol^{−1} |
| Appearance | Transparent crystals |
| Melting point | 205 to 228 °C (401 to 442 °F; 478 to 501 K) (decomposes) |
| Solubility | 1.5g/100g ethanol 19 degC |
| log P | −0.06 |
| Acidity (pK_{a}) | 1.99 (carboxyl), 10.96 (amino) |

Supplementary data page
- Proline (data page)
- Except where otherwise noted, data are given for materials in their standard state (at 25 °C [77 °F], 100 kPa). Infobox references

Proline ball and stick model spinning

Proline (symbol Pro or P) is an organic acid classed as a proteinogenic amino acid (used in the biosynthesis of proteins), although it does not contain the amino group -NH_{2} but is rather a secondary amine. The secondary amine nitrogen is in the protonated form (NH_{2}^{+}) under biological conditions, while the carboxyl group is in the deprotonated −COO^{−} form. The "side chain" from the α carbon connects to the nitrogen forming a pyrrolidine loop, classifying it as a aliphatic amino acid. It is non-essential in humans, meaning the body can synthesize it from the non-essential amino acid L-glutamate. It is encoded by all the codons starting with CC (CCU, CCC, CCA, and CCG).

Proline is the only proteinogenic amino acid which is a secondary amine, as the nitrogen atom is attached both to the α-carbon and to a chain of three carbons that together form a five-membered ring.

== History and etymology ==
Proline was first isolated in 1900 by Richard Willstätter who obtained the amino acid while studying N-methylproline, and synthesized proline by the reaction of sodium salt of diethyl malonate with 1,3-dibromopropane. The next year, Emil Fischer isolated proline from casein and the decomposition products of γ-phthalimido-propylmalonic ester, and published the synthesis of proline from phthalimide propylmalonic ester.

The name proline comes from pyrrolidine, one of its constituents.

== Biosynthesis ==
Proline is biosynthetically derived from the amino acid L-glutamate. Glutamate-5-semialdehyde is first formed by glutamate 5-kinase (ATP-dependent) and glutamate-5-semialdehyde dehydrogenase (which requires NADH or NADPH). This can then either spontaneously cyclize to form 1-pyrroline-5-carboxylic acid, which is reduced to proline by pyrroline-5-carboxylate reductase (using NADH or NADPH), or turned into ornithine by ornithine aminotransferase, followed by cyclisation by ornithine cyclodeaminase to form proline.

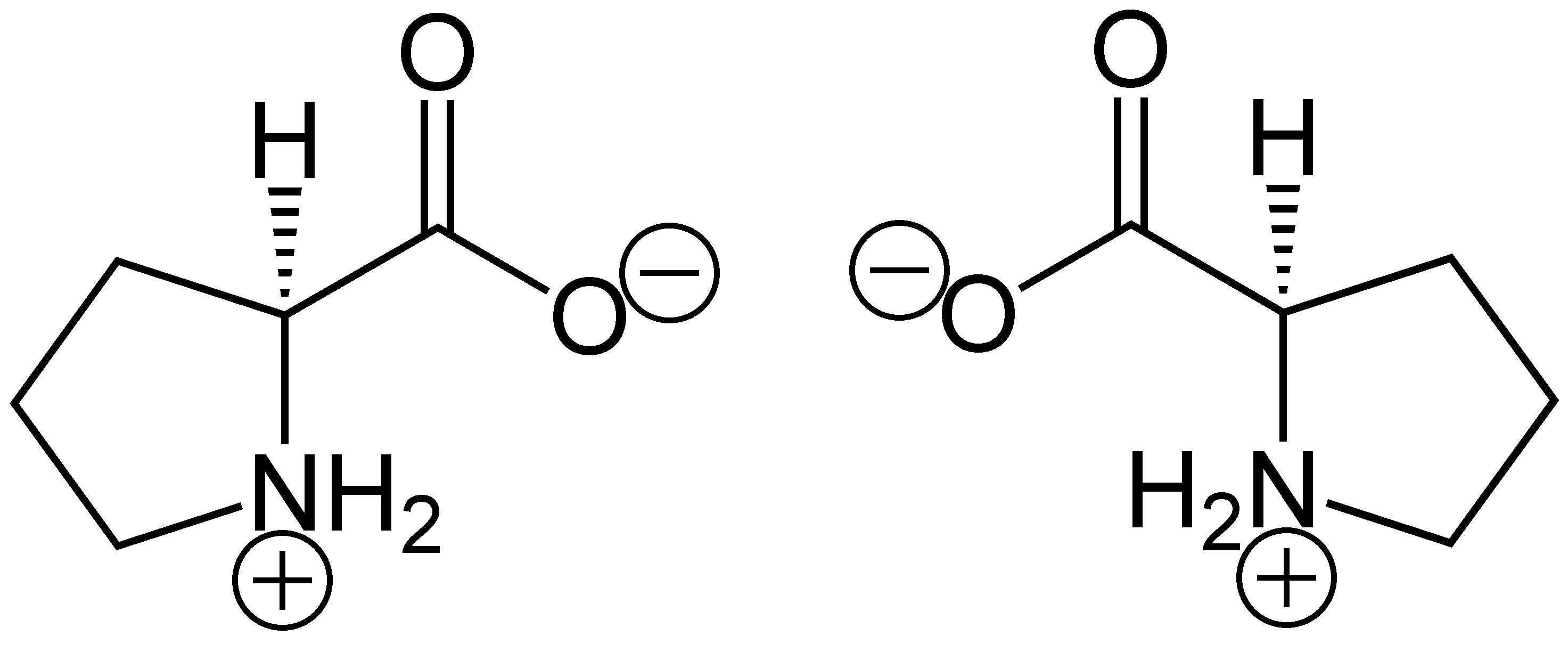
Zwitterionic structure of both proline enantiomers: (S)-proline (left) and (R)-proline

== Biological activity ==
L-Proline has been found to act as a weak agonist of the glycine receptor and of both NMDA and non-NMDA (AMPA/kainate) ionotropic glutamate receptors. It has been proposed to be a potential endogenous excitotoxin. In plants, proline accumulation is a common physiological response to various stresses but is also part of the developmental program in generative tissues (e.g. pollen).

EPRS1 charges with proline to transfer it to tRNA, which can incorporate it into newly synthesized peptide chain during protein translation.

EPRS1 acts, in human cells, as a proviral factor in mammarenaviruses infection, including LCMV, JUNV, and LASV, and its inhibition using halofuginon compound, a prolyl domain inhibitor, completely abolishes the viral infection by interrupting viral assembly and budding.

A diet rich in proline was linked to an increased risk of depression in humans in a study from 2022 that was tested on a limited pre-clinical trial on humans and primarily in other organisms. Results were significant in the other organisms.

== Properties in protein structure ==
The distinctive cyclic structure of proline's side chain gives proline an exceptional conformational rigidity compared to other amino acids. It also affects the rate of peptide bond formation between proline and other amino acids. When proline is bound as an amide in a peptide bond, its nitrogen is not bound to any hydrogen, meaning it cannot act as a hydrogen bond donor, but can be a hydrogen bond acceptor.

Peptide bond formation with incoming Pro-tRNA^{Pro} in the ribosome is considerably slower than with any other tRNAs, which is a general feature of N-alkylamino acids. Peptide bond formation is also slow between an incoming tRNA and a chain ending in proline; with the creation of proline-proline bonds slowest of all.

The exceptional conformational rigidity of proline affects the secondary structure of proteins near a proline residue and may account for proline's higher prevalence in the proteins of thermophilic organisms. Protein secondary structure can be described in terms of the dihedral angles φ, ψ and ω of the protein backbone. The cyclic structure of proline's side chain locks the angle φ at approximately −65°.

Proline acts as a structural disruptor in the middle of regular secondary structure elements such as alpha helices and beta sheets; however, proline is commonly found as the first residue of an alpha helix and also in the edge strands of beta sheets. Proline is also commonly found in turns (another kind of secondary structure), and aids in the formation of beta turns. This may account for the curious fact that proline is usually solvent-exposed, despite having a completely aliphatic side chain.

Multiple prolines and/or hydroxyprolines in a row can create a polyproline helix, the predominant secondary structure in collagen. The hydroxylation of proline by prolyl hydroxylase (or other additions of electron-withdrawing substituents such as fluorine) increases the conformational stability of collagen significantly. Hence, the hydroxylation of proline is a critical biochemical process for maintaining the connective tissue of higher organisms. Severe diseases such as scurvy can result from defects in this hydroxylation, e.g., mutations in the enzyme prolyl hydroxylase or lack of the necessary ascorbate (vitamin C) cofactor.

== Cis–trans isomerization ==
Peptide bonds to proline, and to other N-substituted amino acids (such as sarcosine), are able to populate both the cis and trans isomers. Most peptide bonds overwhelmingly adopt the trans isomer (typically 99.9% under unstrained conditions), chiefly because the amide hydrogen (trans isomer) offers less steric repulsion to the preceding C_{α} atom than does the following C_{α} atom (cis isomer). By contrast, the cis and trans isomers of the X-Pro peptide bond (where X represents any amino acid) both experience steric clashes with the neighboring substitution and have a much lower energy difference. Hence, the fraction of X-Pro peptide bonds in the cis isomer under unstrained conditions is significantly elevated, with cis fractions typically in the range of 3-10%. However, these values depend on the preceding amino acid, with Gly and aromatic residues yielding increased fractions of the cis isomer. Cis fractions up to 40% have been identified for aromatic–proline peptide bonds.

From a kinetic standpoint, cis–trans proline isomerization is a very slow process that can impede the progress of protein folding by trapping one or more proline residues crucial for folding in the non-native isomer, especially when the native protein requires the cis isomer. This is because proline residues are exclusively synthesized in the ribosome as the trans isomer form. All organisms possess prolyl isomerase enzymes to catalyze this isomerization, and some bacteria have specialized prolyl isomerases associated with the ribosome. However, not all prolines are essential for folding, and protein folding may proceed at a normal rate despite having non-native conformers of many X–Pro peptide bonds.

== Uses ==
Proline and its derivatives are often used as asymmetric catalysts in proline organocatalysis reactions. The CBS reduction and proline catalysed aldol condensation are prominent examples.

In brewing, proteins rich in proline combine with polyphenols to produce haze (turbidity).

L-Proline is an osmoprotectant and therefore is used in many pharmaceutical and biotechnological applications.

The growth medium used in plant tissue culture may be supplemented with proline. This can increase growth, perhaps because it helps the plant tolerate the stresses of tissue culture. For proline's role in the stress response of plants, see § Biological activity.

== Specialties ==
Proline is one of the two amino acids that do not follow along with the typical Ramachandran plot, along with glycine. Due to the ring formation connected to the beta carbon, the ψ and φ angles about the peptide bond have fewer allowable degrees of rotation. As a result, it is often found in "turns" of proteins as its free entropy (ΔS) is not as comparatively large to other amino acids and thus in a folded form vs. unfolded form, the change in entropy is smaller. Furthermore, proline is rarely found in α and β structures as it would reduce the stability of such structures, because its side chain α-nitrogen can only form one nitrogen bond.

Additionally, proline is the only amino acid that does not form a red-purple colour when developed by spraying with ninhydrin for uses in chromatography. Proline, instead, produces an orange-yellow colour.

== Synthesis ==
Racemic proline can be synthesized from diethyl malonate and acrylonitrile:

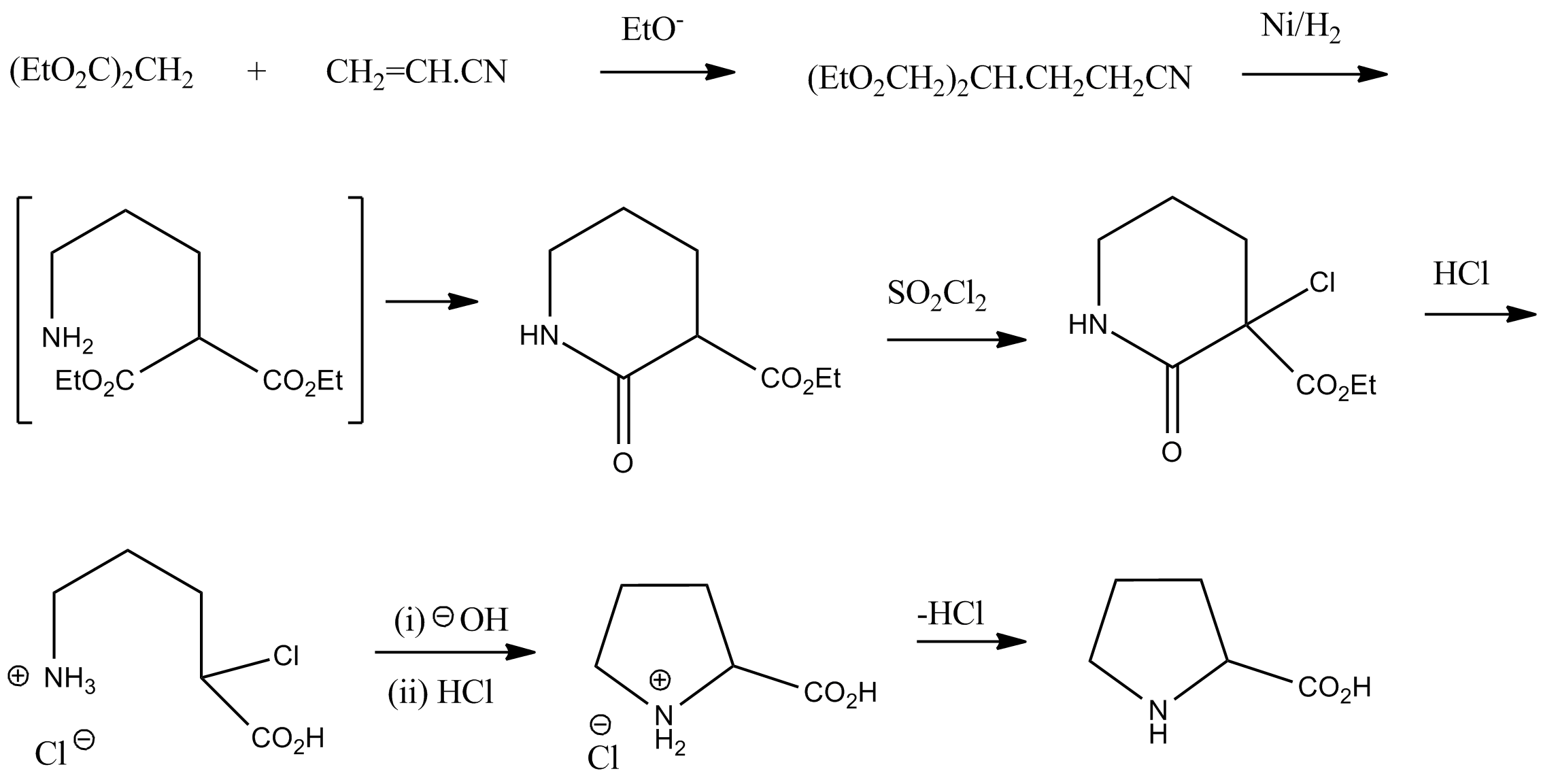

== See also ==
- Hyperprolinemia
- Inborn error of metabolism
- Prolidase deficiency
- Prolinol
