= Secondary amino acid =

Amino acids containing a secondary amine

In organic chemistry, secondary amino acids are amino acids which do not contain the amino group −NH_{2} but are rather a secondary amine (>NH). Secondary amino acids can be classified to cyclic acids, such as proline, and acyclic N-substituted amino acids.

In nature, proline, hydroxyproline, pipecolic acid and sarcosine are well-known secondary amino acids. Proline is the only proteinogenic secondary amino acid; all other secondary amino acids are non-proteinogenic. Hydroxyproline is incorporated into proteins by hydroxylation of proline. Pipecolic acid, a heavier analog of proline, is found in efrapeptin. Sarcosine is a N-methylated glycine in which the methyl group is used in many biochemical reactions. Azetidine-2-carboxylic acid is a smaller homolog of proline that is found in plants.

== Properties ==
Proline and its higher homolog pipecolic acid affect the secondary structure of protein. D-alpha-amino acid - L-alpha-amino acid sequence can induce beta hairpin. It suggested that acyclic secondary amino acids are more flexible than cyclic secondary amino acids in protein by replacement of pipecolic acid by N-methyl-L-alanine in efrapeptin C.

Ninhydrin tests of proline and hydroxyproline give yellow results.

In enzymology, a N-methyl-L-amino-acid oxidase is an oxidase of a subtype of secondary amino acids.

== See also ==
- Imino acid
- Imidic acid
- Secondary amine
