= HIF1A =

Protein-coding gene in the species Homo sapiens

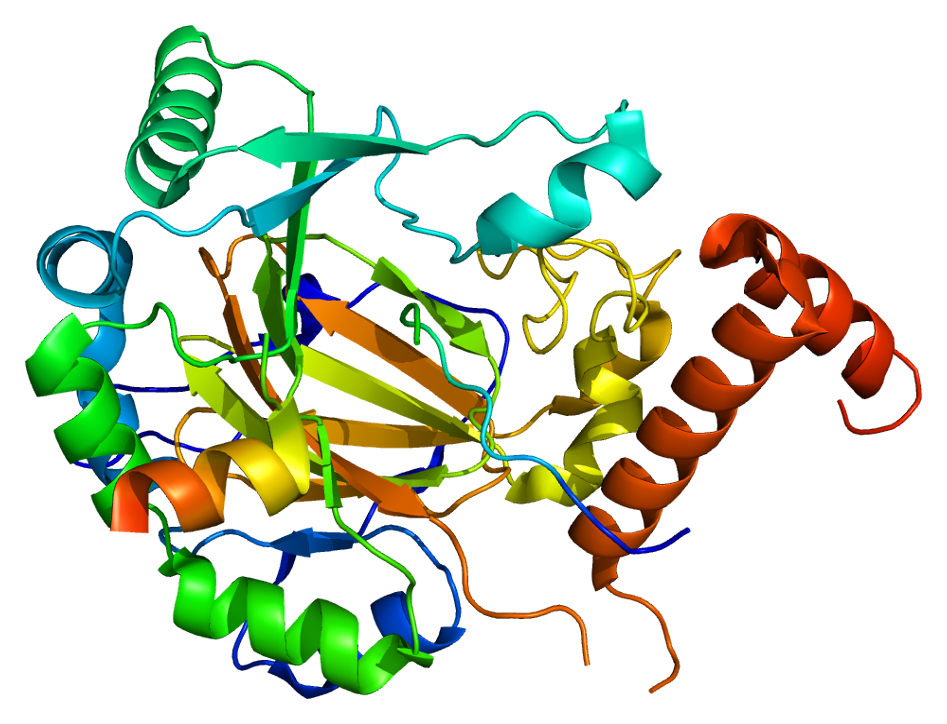

Identifiers
- Aliases: HIF1A, HIF-1-alpha, HIF-1A, HIF-1alpha, HIF1, HIF1-ALPHA, MOP1, PASD8, bHLHe78, hypoxia inducible factor 1 alpha subunit, hypoxia inducible factor 1 subunit alpha, HIF-1α
- External IDs: OMIM: 603348; MGI: 106918; GeneCards: HIF1A
Available structures
PDB	Ortholog search: PDBe RCSB
PDB	List of PDB id codes 1H2K, 1H2L, 1H2M, 1L3E, 1L8C, 1LM8, 1LQB, 2ILM, 3HQR, 3HQU, 4AJY, 4H6J

Gene location (Human)
Chr.	Chromosome 14 (human)
Band	14q23.2	Start	61,695,513 bp
Band	14q23.2	End	61,748,259 bp

Gene location (Mouse)
Chr.	Chromosome 12 (mouse)
Band	12 C3|12 31.99 cM	Start	73,948,149 bp
Band	12 C3|12 31.99 cM	End	73,994,304 bp
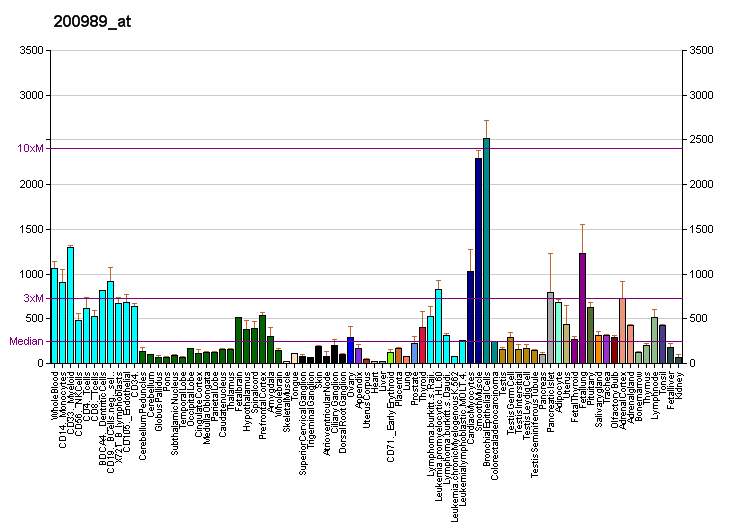
RNA expression pattern
Bgee	Human / Mouse (ortholog); Top expressed in: pancreatic ductal cell; corpus epididymis; caput epididymis; tibia; cartilage tissue; gingival epithelium; visceral pleura; tail of epididymis; seminal vesicula; epithelium of nasopharynx / Top expressed in: pineal gland; retina; stria vascularis; cumulus cell; epithelium of lens; iris; Gonadal ridge; calvaria; abdominal wall; vestibular sensory epithelium; More reference expression data
BioGPS	More reference expression data
Gene ontology
Molecular function	protein dimerization activity; DNA-binding transcription factor activity; DNA-binding transcription activator activity, RNA polymerase II-specific; histone deacetylase binding; transcription factor binding; enzyme binding; protein binding; histone acetyltransferase binding; protein kinase binding; Hsp90 protein binding; sequence-specific DNA binding; DNA binding; transcription factor activity, RNA polymerase II distal enhancer sequence-specific binding; ubiquitin protein ligase binding; protein heterodimerization activity; E-box binding; p53 binding; protein domain specific binding; DNA-binding transcription factor activity, RNA polymerase II-specific; RNA polymerase II transcription regulatory region sequence-specific DNA binding
Cellular component	cytoplasm; cytosol; nucleus; nuclear speck; motile cilium; transcription regulator complex; RNA polymerase II transcription regulator complex; axon cytoplasm; nucleoplasm; nuclear body; protein-containing complex
Biological process	negative regulation of neuron apoptotic process; B-1 B cell homeostasis; regulation of transforming growth factor beta2 production; muscle cell cellular homeostasis; outflow tract morphogenesis; negative regulation of ossification; heart looping; negative regulation of TOR signaling; blood vessel development; hemoglobin biosynthetic process; angiogenesis; positive regulation of chemokine-mediated signaling pathway; positive regulation of insulin secretion involved in cellular response to glucose stimulus; positive regulation of hormone biosynthetic process; negative regulation of mesenchymal cell apoptotic process; regulation of aerobic respiration; positive regulation of neuroblast proliferation; dopaminergic neuron differentiation; lactate metabolic process; regulation of transcription, DNA-templated; blood vessel morphogenesis; positive regulation of erythrocyte differentiation; glucose homeostasis; vascular endothelial growth factor production; regulation of thymocyte apoptotic process; positive regulation of epithelial cell migration; negative regulation of thymocyte apoptotic process; transcription, DNA-templated; positive regulation of transcription, DNA-templated; axonal transport of mitochondrion; positive regulation of macroautophagy; cartilage development; positive regulation of nitric-oxide synthase activity; regulation of transcription from RNA polymerase II promoter in response to hypoxia; lactation; negative regulation of oxidative stress-induced neuron intrinsic apoptotic signaling pathway; positive regulation of pri-miRNA transcription by RNA polymerase II; digestive tract morphogenesis; cell differentiation; neural fold elevation formation; positive regulation of autophagy; retina vasculature development in camera-type eye; collagen metabolic process; embryonic placenta development; negative regulation of apoptotic process; positive regulation of angiogenesis; regulation of glycolytic process; epithelial to mesenchymal transition; cerebral cortex development; regulation of gene expression; positive regulation of chemokine production; intestinal epithelial cell maturation; regulation of catalytic activity; positive regulation of autophagy of mitochondrion; cardiac ventricle morphogenesis; response to muscle activity; epithelial cell differentiation involved in mammary gland alveolus development; visual learning; positive regulation of vascular endothelial growth factor receptor signaling pathway; negative regulation of bone mineralization; negative regulation of growth; response to hypoxia; positive regulation of endothelial cell proliferation; regulation of transcription from RNA polymerase II promoter in response to oxidative stress; iris morphogenesis; mRNA transcription by RNA polymerase II; hypoxia-inducible factor-1alpha signaling pathway; vasculature development; regulation of cell population proliferation; neural crest cell migration; embryonic hemopoiesis; connective tissue replacement involved in inflammatory response wound healing; positive regulation of transcription from RNA polymerase II promoter in response to hypoxia; negative regulation of reactive oxygen species metabolic process; positive regulation of vascular endothelial growth factor production; elastin metabolic process; positive regulation of glycolytic process; oxygen homeostasis; signal transduction; positive regulation of transcription by RNA polymerase II; cellular iron ion homeostasis; camera-type eye morphogenesis; cellular response to hypoxia; cellular response to interleukin-1; transcription by RNA polymerase II; protein deubiquitination; post-translational protein modification; response to iron ion; negative regulation of gene expression; positive regulation of blood vessel endothelial cell migration; positive regulation of gene expression; cytokine-mediated signaling pathway; regulation of transcription by RNA polymerase II; protein ubiquitination
Sources:Amigo / QuickGO
Orthologs
Databases	NCBI: entry; OMA: entry
Species	Human	Mouse
Entrez	3091	15251
Ensembl	ENSG00000100644	ENSMUSG00000021109
UniProt	Q16665	Q61221
RefSeq (mRNA)	NM_181054; NM_001243084; NM_001530	NM_010431; NM_001313919; NM_001313920
RefSeq (protein)	NP_001230013; NP_001521; NP_851397; NP_001521.1	NP_001300848; NP_001300849; NP_034561
Location (UCSC)	Chr 14: 61.7 – 61.75 Mb	Chr 12: 73.95 – 73.99 Mb
PubMed search
- Wikidata
View/Edit Human	View/Edit Mouse

Hypoxia-inducible factor 1-alpha, also known as HIF-1-alpha, is a subunit of a heterodimeric transcription factor hypoxia-inducible factor 1 (HIF-1) that is encoded by the HIF1A gene. The Nobel Prize in Physiology or Medicine 2019 was awarded for the discovery of HIF.

HIF1A is a basic helix-loop-helix PAS domain containing protein, and is considered as the master transcriptional regulator of cellular and developmental response to hypoxia. The dysregulation and overexpression of HIF1A by either hypoxia or genetic alternations have been heavily implicated in cancer biology, as well as a number of other pathophysiologies, specifically in areas of vascularization and angiogenesis, energy metabolism, cell survival, and tumor invasion. The presence of HIF1A in a hypoxic environment is required to push forward normal placental development in early gestation. Two other alternative transcripts encoding different isoforms have been identified.

== Structure ==
HIF1 is a heterodimeric basic helix-loop-helix structure that is composed of HIF1A, the alpha subunit (this protein), and the aryl hydrocarbon receptor nuclear translocator (Arnt), the beta subunit. HIF1A contains a basic helix-loop-helix domain near the C-terminal, followed by two distinct PAS (PER-ARNT-SIM) domains, and a PAC (PAS-associated C-terminal) domain. The HIF1A polypeptide also contains a nuclear localization signal motif, two transactivating domains CTAD and NTAD, and an intervening inhibitory domain (ID) that can repress the transcriptional activities of CTAD and NTAD. There are a total of three HIF1A isoforms formed by alternative splicing, however isoform1 has been chosen as the canonical structure, and is the most extensively studied isoform in structure and function.

== Gene and expression ==
The human HIF1A gene encodes for the alpha subunit, HIF1A of the transcription factor hypoxia-inducible factor (HIF1). Its protein expression level can be measured by antibodies against HIF-1-alpha through various biological detection methods including western blot or immunostaining. HIF1A expression level is dependent on its GC-rich promoter activation. In most cells, HIF1A gene is constitutively expressed in low levels under normoxic conditions, however, under hypoxia, HIF1A transcription is often significantly upregulated. Typically, oxygen-independent pathway regulates protein expression, and oxygen-dependent pathway regulates degradation. In hypoxia-independent ways, HIF1A expression may be upregulated through a redox-sensitive mechanism.

== Function ==
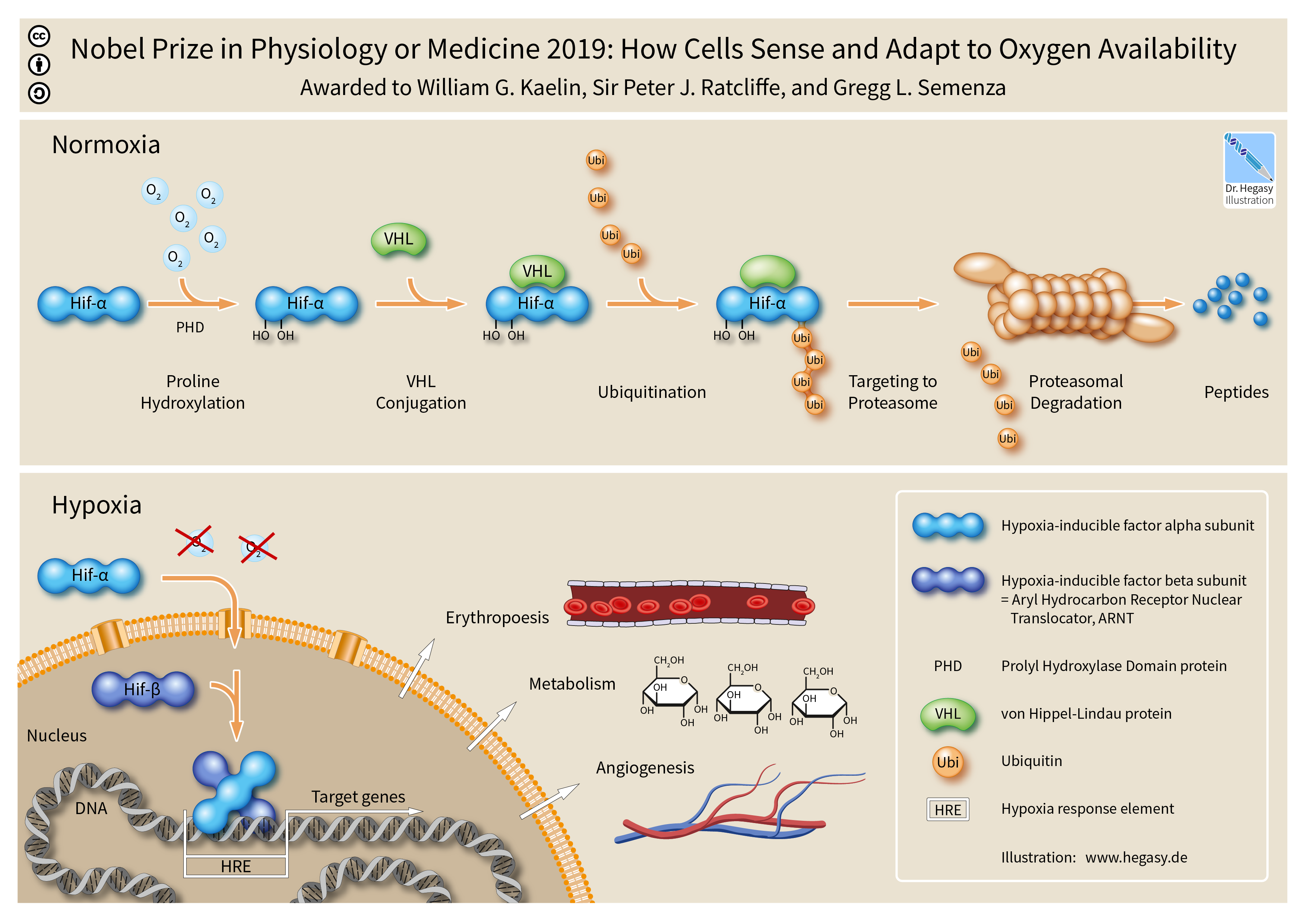
Nobel Prize in Physiology/ Medicine 2019: Cellular Oxygen Sensing and Adaptation by Hif-alpha

The transcription factor HIF-1 plays an important role in cellular response to systemic oxygen levels in mammals. HIF1A activity is regulated by a host of post-translational modifications: hydroxylation, acetylation, and phosphorylation. HIF-1 is known to induce transcription of more than 60 genes, including VEGF and erythropoietin that are involved in biological processes such as angiogenesis and erythropoiesis, which assist in promoting and increasing oxygen delivery to hypoxic regions. HIF-1 also induces transcription of genes involved in cell proliferation and survival, as well as glucose and iron metabolism. In accordance with its dynamic biological role, HIF-1 responds to systemic oxygen levels by undergoing conformational changes, and associates with HRE regions of promoters of hypoxia-responsive genes to induce transcription.

HIF1A stability, subcellular localization, as well as transcriptional activity are especially affected by oxygen level. The alpha subunit forms a heterodimer with the beta subunit. Under normoxic conditions, VHL-mediated ubiquitin protease pathway rapidly degrades HIF1A; however, under hypoxia, HIF1A protein degradation is prevented and HIF1A levels accumulate to associate with HIF1B to exert transcriptional roles on target genes Enzymes prolyl hydroxylase (PHD) and HIF prolyl hydroxylase (HPH) are involved in specific post-translational modification of HIF1A proline residues (P402 and P564 within the ODD domain), which allows for VHL association with HIF1A. The enzymatic activity of oxygen sensor dioxygenase PHD is dependent on oxygen level as it requires oxygen as one of its main substrates to transfer to the proline residue of HIF1A. The hydroxylated proline residue of HIF1A is then recognized and buried in the hydrophobic core of von Hippel-Lindau tumor suppressor protein (VHL), which itself is part of a ubiquitin ligase enzyme. Once the hydroxylated HIF1A is buried in the VHL protein, VHL will transport it to a proteasome to digest and destroy HIF1A. This prevents HIF1A from entering the cell nucleus to carry out the transcription of many regulatory pathways. Many of these pathways are necessary for proper placental development in early gestation. Under normoxic conditions, HIF1A will be hydroxylated and destroyed, which leads to placental tissue necrosis, disorganization, and overgrowth. The hydroxylation of HIF1A proline residue also regulates its ability to associate with co-activators under hypoxia. The function of the HIF1A gene can be effectively examined by siRNA knockdown based on an independent validation.

=== Repair, regeneration and rejuvenation ===
In normal circumstances, after injury, HIF1A is degraded by prolyl hydroxylases (PHDs). In June 2015, scientists found that continued up-regulation of HIF1A via PHD inhibitors regenerates lost or damaged tissue in mammals with a repair response, whereas continued down-regulation of HIF1A results in healing with a scarring response in mammals that previously responded regeneratively to tissue loss. The act of regulating HIF1A can either turn off, or turn on the key processes of mammalian regeneration. One such regenerative process in which HIF1A is involved is peripheral nerve regeneration. Following axon injury, HIF1A activates VEGFA to promote regeneration and functional recovery. HIF1A also controls skin healing. Researchers at the Stanford University School of Medicine demonstrated that HIF1A activation was able to prevent and treat chronic wounds in diabetic and aged mice. Not only did the wounds in the mice heal more quickly, but the quality of the new skin was even better than the original. Additionally the regenerative effect of HIF-1A modulation on aged skin cells was described and a rejuvenating effect on aged facial skin was demonstrated in patients. HIF modulation has also been linked to a beneficial effect on hair loss.

== Regulation ==
HIF1A abundance (and its subsequent activity) is regulated transcriptionally in an NF-κB-dependent manner. In addition, the coordinated activity of the prolyl hydroxylases (PHDs) maintain the appropriate balance of HIF1A protein in the post-translation phase.

PHDs rely on iron among other molecules to hydroxylate HIF1A; as such, iron chelators such as desferrioxamine (DFO) have proven successful in HIF1A stabilization. HBO (Hyperbaric oxygen therapy) and HIF1A imitators such as cobalt chloride have also been successfully utilized.

Factors increasing HIF1A

- Modulator of degradation:
  - Oxygen-dependent:
    - EPF UCP (degrades pHVL)
    - VDU2 (de-ubiquitinates HIF1A)
    - SUMOylation (via RSUME)
    - DeSUMOylation ( via SENP1)
  - Oxygen-independent:
    - Calcineurin A (Ca2+-dependent via RACK1)
- Modulators of translation:
  - RNA-binding proteins, PTB, and HuR
  - PtdIns3K and MAPK pathways
  - IRES-mediated translation
  - calcium signaling
  - miRNAs

Factors decreasing HIF1A

- Modulator of degradation:
  - Oxygen-dependent:
    - PHD, VHL, OS-9 and SSAT2
    - SUMOylation
  - Oxygen-independent
    - RACK1 and SSAT1
    - GSK3β
    - FOXO4
- Modulators of translation:
  - Calcium signaling
  - miRNAs

== Role in cancer ==
HIF1A is overexpressed in many human cancers. HIF1A overexpression is heavily implicated in promoting tumor growth and metastasis through its role in initiating angiogenesis and regulating cellular metabolism to overcome hypoxia. Hypoxia promotes apoptosis in both normal and tumor cells. However, hypoxic conditions in tumor microenvironment especially, along with accumulation of genetic alternations often contribute to HIF1A overexpression.

Significant HIF1A expression has been noted in most solid tumors studied, which include cancers of the gastric, colon, breast, pancreas, kidneys, prostate, ovary, brain, and bladder. Clinically, elevated HIF1A levels in a number of cancers, including cervical cancer, non-small-cell lung carcinoma, breast cancer (LV-positive and negative), oligodendroglioma, oropharyngeal cancer, ovarian cancer, endometrial cancer, esophageal cancer, head and neck cancer, and stomach cancer, have been associated with aggressive tumor progression, and thus has been implicated as a predictive and prognostic marker for resistance to radiation treatment, chemotherapy, and increased mortality. HIF1A expression may also regulate breast tumor progression. Elevated HIF1A levels may be detected in early cancer development, and have been found in early ductal carcinoma in situ, a pre-invasive stage in breast cancer development, and is also associated with increased microvasculature density in tumor lesions. Moreover, despite histologically determined low-grade, lymph-node negative breast tumor in a subset of patients examined, detection of significant HIF1A expression was able to independently predict poor response to therapy. Similar findings have been reported in brain cancer and ovarian cancer studies as well, and suggest a regulatory role of HIF1A in initiating angiogenesis through interactions with pro-angiogenic factors such as VEGF. Studies of glioblastoma multiforme show striking similarity between HIF1A expression pattern and that of VEGF gene transcription level. In addition, high-grade glioblastoma multiform tumors with high VEGF expression pattern, similar to breast cancer with HIF1A overexpression, display significant signs of tumor neovascularization. This further suggests the regulatory role of HIF1A in promoting tumor progression, likely through hypoxia-induced VEGF expression pathways.

HIF1A overexpression in tumors may also occur in a hypoxia-independent pathway. In hemangioblastoma, HIF1A expression is found in most cells sampled from the well-vascularized tumor. Although in both renal carcinoma and hemangioblastoma, the von Hippel-Lindau gene is inactivated, HIF1A is still expressed at high levels. In addition to VEGF overexpression in response to elevated HIF1A levels, the PI3K/AKT pathway is also involved in tumor growth. In prostate cancers, the commonly occurring PTEN mutation is associated with tumor progression toward aggressive stage, increased vascular density and angiogenesis.

During hypoxia, tumor suppressor p53 overexpression may be associated with HIF1A-dependent pathway to initiate apoptosis. Moreover, p53-independent pathway may also induce apoptosis through the Bcl-2 pathway. However, overexpression of HIF1A is cancer- and individual-specific, and depends on the accompanying genetic alternations and levels of pro- and anti-apoptotic factors present. One study on epithelial ovarian cancer shows HIF1A and nonfunctional tumor suppressor p53 is correlated with low levels of tumor cell apoptosis and poor prognosis. Further, early-stage esophageal cancer patients with demonstrated overexpression of HIF1 and absence of BCL2 expression also failed photodynamic therapy.

While research efforts to develop therapeutic drugs to target hypoxia-associated tumor cells have been ongoing for many years, there has not yet been any breakthrough that has shown selectivity and effectiveness at targeting HIF1A pathways to decrease tumor progression and angiogenesis. Successful therapeutic approaches in the future may also be highly case-specific to particular cancers and individuals, and seem unlikely to be widely applicable due to the genetically heterogenous nature of the many cancer types and subtypes.

== Role in stroke ==
HIF-1α (Hypoxia-Inducible Factor-1 Alpha) is a critical regulator of cellular responses to hypoxia and plays dual roles in both adaptive survival and pathological injury during stroke. In the event of an ischemic stroke, reduced cerebral blood flow creates a hypoxic environment that stabilizes HIF-1α by preventing its usual proteasomal degradation. This stabilization allows HIF-1α entering into the cell nucleus and to dimerize with HIF-1β, forming the active HIF-1 transcription complex, which then binds to hypoxia-response elements (HREs) in the DNA to regulate a broad array of genes. The resulting gene expression program initiates both protective and detrimental pathways, depending on the severity and duration of the ischemic insult.

In its adaptive role, HIF-1α upregulates genes that support cell survival under low-oxygen conditions. It enhances glycolysis by increasing the expression of glucose transporters (such as GLUT1) and key glycolytic enzymes (like PDK1), thereby facilitating anaerobic ATP production to maintain neuronal metabolism. Furthermore, HIF-1α induces the expression of vascular endothelial growth factor (VEGF), which is essential for angiogenesis and the revascularization of the ischemic penumbra. The factor also promotes erythropoiesis by stimulating erythropoietin (EPO) production, thereby improving oxygen delivery and exerting direct neuroprotective and anti-apoptotic effects. Additionally, transient HIF-1α activation—as seen in ischemic preconditioning—can prime cells to better tolerate subsequent episodes of ischemia through the development of ischemic tolerance mechanisms.

Conversely, HIF-1α can also mediate maladaptive processes that exacerbate brain injury after stroke. Although VEGF-induced angiogenesis is beneficial for restoring blood flow, excessive VEGF can increase vascular permeability, leading to blood-brain barrier (BBB) disruption, cerebral edema, and the infiltration of inflammatory cells. HIF-1α further contributes to the inflammatory cascade by upregulating pro-inflammatory cytokines such as TNF-α and IL-1β, which intensify neuroinflammation and secondary damage. In addition, prolonged activation of HIF-1α can upregulate pro-apoptotic genes like BNIP3 and NIX, triggering mitochondrial dysfunction and cell death. The reliance on glycolytic metabolism during hypoxia also leads to lactic acid accumulation, which lowers pH and induces acidotoxicity, thereby compounding neuronal injury.

The temporal and contextual dynamics of HIF-1α activity are crucial in determining its overall impact during stroke. In the acute phase, HIF-1α activation predominantly supports cell survival through mechanisms such as enhanced glycolysis and angiogenesis. However, if activation persists into the subacute or chronic phase, the shift towards pro-inflammatory and pro-apoptotic pathways can worsen outcomes by promoting BBB breakdown and neuronal death. Moreover, the balance of HIF-1α's effects is influenced by the degree of hypoxia: mild hypoxia tends to favor adaptive responses, whereas severe or prolonged hypoxia shifts the balance toward deleterious outcomes.

These complex roles of HIF-1α have significant therapeutic implications for stroke management. Targeted modulation of HIF-1α activity could optimize its protective benefits while minimizing its harmful effects. For instance, agents that stabilize HIF-1α—such as cobalt chloride or prolyl hydroxylase domain (PHD) inhibitors—might be used in the preconditioning or subacute phase to enhance recovery. Conversely, in the acute phase, strategies aimed at inhibiting HIF-1α activity (using approaches like siRNA or small molecule inhibitors) may help to reduce edema, inflammation, and apoptosis. Ultimately, achieving the correct spatiotemporal modulation of HIF-1α represents a promising strategy for developing targeted therapies to improve outcomes in stroke patients.

== Role in fetal development ==
HIF1a is a critical factor involved in placentation during the early phases of pregnancy. The placenta is a crucial organ for pregnancy and serves as the primary source of nutrients, oxygen, waste removal, endocrine regulation, and immune protection for the developing fetus. As a critical oxygen sensor and growth regulator, HIF1a senses the hypoxic conditions present in utero during early pregnancy and initiates the growth of syncytiotrophoblast cells to remodel maternal spiral arteries. This remodeling is crucial to the continuous flow of nutrients and oxygen from maternal blood to the fetus via the placenta in the later stages of pregnancy. The inactivation of HIF1a during early pregnancy can lead to failure of the placenta to adequately vascularize, which can result in fetal death during later pregnancy; additionally, overexpression of HIF1a during middle to late pregnancy due to sustained hypoxia, genetic mutation, or other abnormal stimuli has been associated with the development of pre-eclampsia and intrauterine growth restriction. Due to the significant role of HIF1a in interpreting and responding to systemic oxygen levels at all stages of life, there does exist a gene knockout model that can be used for study.

== Interactions ==
HIF1A has been shown to interact with:

- ARNTL,
- ARNT,
- CREBB,
- EP300,
- HIF1AN,
- Mdm2,
- NR4A,
- P53,
- PSMA7,
- STAT3,
- UBC,
- VH and
- VHL.
- GR (NR3C1).

== Role in Fish ==
=== Hypoxia in fish ===
On an organismal level, when a fish is introduced to hypoxic conditions they may have a sudden reaction to the drop in oxygen levels, but as time persists, breathing through the gills will become more shallow to conserve energy. The gills play a crucial role in oxygen transport, ion exchange, osmoregulation and ammonia excretion, so if the gills cannot extract oxygen from hypoxic water efficiently, then it may impact other functions in the fish. If the oxygen threshold is crossed, a fish may switch from aerobic metabolism to anaerobic metabolism to alternatively produce less ATP in the absence of oxygen. For example, Japanese flounder (Paralichthys olivaceus) increased both HIF-1α genes and LDH-A genes during acute hypoxic treatment (dissolved oxygen at 2.07 ± 0.08 mg/L), suggesting that HIF directly regulates the genes directly involved with anaerobic metabolism. Over time, a fish's gill morphology may change to acclimate or adapt to these oxygen or temperature fluxes caused by hypoxic environments on chronic timelines.

=== HIF-1α molecular process in fish ===
Hypoxia responses in fish are primarily mediated by HIF-1α, a transcription factor that is degraded in metazoans under normoxic conditions, but activates in expression under hypoxia. Thus, HIF-1α is known as the master regulator in hypoxia response within the cell. The regulation of HIF-1α is dependent upon the inhibition of Prolyl Hydroxylation (PHD) and Factors Inhibiting HIF (FIH) which are abundant in normoxic conditions in the cell. When the cell experiences normoxia, the mitochondria consume the available oxygen and ubiquitin binds to VHL E3 ubiquitin ligase which results in a degradation of HIF. When hypoxia occurs in the cell, all oxygen is consumed by the mitochondria and the inhibition of PHD occurs which triggers the transcription of HIF-1α subunits. In fish, HIF-1α regulates the gene expression of oxygen transport systems, helping them cope with low oxygen levels over acute and acclimatory timescales. Furthermore, the HIF pathway is known to regulate metabolic demands through the upregulation of LDH-A genes that convert pyruvate to lactate during anaerobic metabolism. Another role of HIF-1a as a master regulator in the cell is promoting the transport of glucose through GLUT 1. Largemouth bass (Micropterus salmoides) showed an increase in HIF-1a genes and GLUT 1 genes in response to acute hypoxia (DO: 1.2 ± 0.2 mg/L) in a laboratory setting. Additionally in this study, bass also upregulated red blood cells (RBC) and other antioxidant enzymes were upregulated after exposure. HIF-1α is known to increase erythropoiesis (formation of red blood cells) and the oxygen-carrying pigment hemoglobin in mammalian cells. Fish possess Erythropoietin (EPO) which drives red blood cell production and thus oxygen transport for key tissue types like gills in fish that extract oxygen from the water flow.

HIF-1α also affects ammonia excretion, HIF-1a has also shown to upregulate Rhbg and down regulate mRNA expression of HIF1α over 3 days in Amur Ide (Leuciscus waleckii) in high alkaline water (54 mM, pH 9.6) The author also notes that oxygen had no effect on HIF-1a expression, but rather alkalinity, since HIF-1a was shown to binding to Rhbg's promoter region. An additional role HIF-1a plays is the regulation of angiogenesis which can turn on and off the formation of new blood vessels to transport blood and oxygen to the body of an animal. Therefore, HIF-1α is not only in charge in regulating hypoxia response within the cell, but also other pathways including glycolysis, metabolism, angiogenesis, and erythropoiesis.

=== HIF-1α in fish physiology ===
In an attempt to maintain homeostasis and compensate with hypoxic conditions, fish will upregulate HIF-1α and other stress related genes to handle the low oxygen conditions. HIF-1α has been used in numerous studies to quantify the biochemical changes that occur within fish tissue before, during, and after hypoxia exposure. One study analyzing the effects of progressive hypoxia and reoxygenation in Korean Black rockfish (Sebastes schlegelii), showed that HIF-1α mRNA in gill and liver were significantly upregulated at loss of equilibrium (LOE) and 50% lethal time (LT50). One study showed that flatfish turbot (Scophthalmus maximus) increased gene expression in the HIF pathway (HIF-1α, HIF-2α, HIF-3α) under acute hypoxia as they attempted to compensate for the lack of DO in the environment. Flatfish are generally known to be more hypoxia tolerant and efficient at regulating low oxygenated environments than other fish. At the proteomic level, fat greenling (Hexagrammos otakii), showed increased levels of HIF-1α protein when oxygen levels were 2.2 ± 0.2 DO mg/L for 6 hours, 12 hours, 24 hours, and at 48 hours, compared with the control group at 7.8 ± 0.2 DO mg/L using qRT-PCR and ELISA assays. Furthermore, HIF-1a was also correlated with hemoglobin (HB), ERO-1α, and lactic acid (LA) showing how it is involved with other metabolites. However, this upregulation in HIF introduces energetic trade-offs that may inhibit other cellular functions such as mitochondrial oxygen consumption and disruption of the citric acid cycle. One study using crucian carp (Carassius carassius) found that HIF-1a increased in liver, gills and heart under hypoxia (0.7 mg l(-1) O2) at all temperatures (26, 18 and 8 degrees C). This study shows how HIF-1a is also upregulated under extreme temperature changes like cold treatment, HIF-1α increased in liver, gills and heart under the coldest treatment (8 degrees C). Therefore, many environmental factors may influence and trigger the HIF-1a pathway in fish.

=== HIF-1α in mammals and fish ===
HIF-1α in mammals and fish behave very similarly with both having the same amount of genes present and structure and function is virtually the same. However, the expression of HIF-1α differs within tissue type and species of fish, showing how specific isomers may differ in function with varying tissue types. Using ovoviviparous Korean Black rockfish (Sebastes schlegelii) in the Eastern Pacific, researchers found that HIF-1α pathway mRNA transcripts were upregulated during acute hypoxic stress. They also found that all of the motifs of the HIF proteins from mammalian species were present in Korean black rockfish and the rockfish had a shorter length of protein sequence than mammals. Another study using bighead carp (Aristichthys nobilis) found that the tertiary structure of HIF-1α is very similar to that of mammalian mice showing that mice and fish HIF-1a levels may be comparable in future studies.

=== HIF-1α quantification ===
HIF-1α may be measured in many ways, including cDNA, mRNA, protein (using methods such as RT-qPCR, qPCR, Western blot and ELISA). These various molecular techniques are able to piece apart how HIF-1a operates within the cell and outside of the cell in the fish. Using RT-qPCR, researchers found a significant increase in the expression of HIF-1α in brain, liver, gonad, and kidney tissues of Korean black rockfish exposed to high water temperature (27°C), showing how temperature directly impacts the surrounding oxygen concentrations in the water due to lower solubility. One of the first studies using cDNA in rainbow trout, researchers cloned HIF-1a (3605 base pairs) and found that HIF-1a accumulates most when the fish is experiencing 5 % oxygen levels (38 tor). After cloning, they used Western Blot analysis to detect the amount of protein between chinook salmon and rainbow trout cells.

It has been shown that mRNA levels of HIF-1α are not a direct one to one correlation with actual protein output. Using Gulf killifish (Fundulus grandis), researchers found that HIF-1a mRNA levels were unaffected by hypoxia compared with the actual protein output which saw increases in brain, ovary, and skeletal muscle over acute stress (24 hour at 1 mg O2 l−1). One study using ELISA assays, found that speckled sand dabs (Citharichthys stigmaeus) and English sole (Parophrys vetulus) showed no significant changes in HIF-1a in fish in hypoxic conditions (8.0, 6.0, 4.0, 3.0, 2.0, and 1.5 mg/L), but also showed elevated ventilation rates in both species, showing that biochemical changes may not affect the physiological condition of the fish. HIF-1α has also been tested in various tissue types in fish, including gills, brain, muscle, ovary, kidneys, blood plasma and liver. HIF-1a may behave differently in tissue types that provide a unique function in the animal, therefore, studies should use multiple tissue types to understand how HIF-1α functions in different tissues.

=== HIF-1α as a biomarker ===
The potential for HIF-1α to become a biomarker of hypoxia response has been tested in a variety of studies, most of which find that HIF-1α to be a suitable biomarker for acute hypoxic stress in fish. However, their application from the laboratory setting to in situ situations need further study. Biomarkers of physiological stress identified in a laboratory setting may not be ecologically relevant in a natural setting. For example, a study using juvenile Senegalese sole (Solea senegalensis) exposed to varying estuary sediments found the laboratory and in situ assays of DNA damage and chromosomal errors were correlated, but exhibited different genotoxicity profiles. These differences likely reflect the myriad of co-occurring and interacting environmental factors in field studies, highlighting the value of using both approaches for biomarker validation. Laboratory experiments are able to control for specific environmental factors, which may be useful to test the independent and combined effects of multiple stressors like DO and pH on biomarker responses. However, in situ experiments and sampling across a range of naturally varying environmental conditions may be more ecologically relevant, even with the introduction of unaccounted variables. The combination of both types of experiments can provide a holistic understanding of the mechanisms driving energetic and stress responses in the fish.

== See also ==
- Hypoxia inducible factors
