= L-pipecolate dehydrogenase =

Identifiers
- EC no.: 1.5.99.3
- CAS no.: 9076-63-5

Databases
- IntEnz: IntEnz view
- BRENDA: BRENDA entry
- ExPASy: NiceZyme view
- KEGG: KEGG entry
- MetaCyc: metabolic pathway
- PRIAM: profile
- PDB structures: RCSB PDB PDBe PDBsum
- Gene Ontology: AmiGO / QuickGO
Search
- PMC: articles
- PubMed: articles
- NCBI: proteins

L-pipecolate dehydrogenase (EC 1.5.99.3) is an enzyme that catalyzes the chemical reaction

L-pipecolic acid
+ electron
acceptor
(2S)-2,3,4,5-tetrahydropyridine-2-carboxylic acid
+ reduced
acceptor

The two substrates of this enzyme are L-pipecolic acid and an electron acceptor. Its products are (2S)-2,3,4,5-tetrahydropyridine-2-carboxylic acid and the corresponding reduced acceptor.

This enzyme belongs to the family of oxidoreductases, specifically those acting on the CH-NH group of donors with other acceptors. The systematic name of this enzyme class is L-pipecolate:acceptor 1,6-oxidoreductase. This enzyme is also called L-pipecolate:(acceptor) 1,6-oxidoreductase. It participates in lysine degradation. The exact nature of the electron acceptor is unknown, unlike for the enzyme L-pipecolate oxidase, which uses oxygen.
