= P4HA2 =

Protein-coding gene in the species Homo sapiens

Identifiers
- Aliases: P4HA2, prolyl 4-hydroxylase subunit alpha 2, MYP25, lncRNA-PE
- External IDs: OMIM: 600608; MGI: 894286; GeneCards: P4HA2
Enzyme activity
EC #	BRENDA	ExPASy	KEGG	MetaCyc
1.14.11.2	↗	↗	↗	↗

Gene location (Human)
Chr.	Chromosome 5 (human)
Band	5q31.1	Start	132,190,147 bp
Band	5q31.1	End	132,295,315 bp

Gene location (Mouse)
Chr.	Chromosome 11 (mouse)
Band	11 B1.3|11 32.13 cM	Start	53,990,921 bp
Band	11 B1.3|11 32.13 cM	End	54,022,491 bp
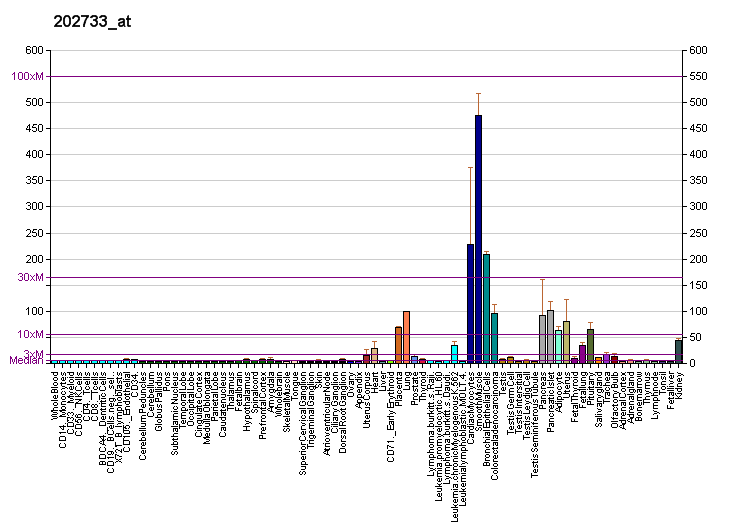
RNA expression pattern
Bgee	Human / Mouse (ortholog); Top expressed in: stromal cell of endometrium; tibia; body of pancreas; islet of Langerhans; bronchial epithelial cell; cartilage tissue; apex of heart; smooth muscle tissue; right auricle of heart; corpus epididymis / Top expressed in: molar; calvaria; epithelium of lens; umbilical cord; gastrula; body of femur; stroma of bone marrow; right lung lobe; otic placode; muscle of thigh; More reference expression data
BioGPS	More reference expression data
Gene ontology
Molecular function	iron ion binding; electron transfer activity; L-ascorbic acid binding; oxidoreductase activity; protein binding; oxidoreductase activity, acting on single donors with incorporation of molecular oxygen, incorporation of two atoms of oxygen; dioxygenase activity; procollagen-proline 4-dioxygenase activity; oxidoreductase activity, acting on paired donors, with incorporation or reduction of molecular oxygen; metal ion binding
Cellular component	endoplasmic reticulum; intracellular membrane-bounded organelle; endoplasmic reticulum lumen; nucleoplasm; cytosol
Biological process	peptidyl-proline hydroxylation; electron transport chain; peptidyl-proline hydroxylation to 4-hydroxy-L-proline
Sources:Amigo / QuickGO
Orthologs
Databases	NCBI: entry; OMA: entry
Species	Human	Mouse
Entrez	8974	18452
Ensembl	ENSG00000072682	ENSMUSG00000018906
UniProt	O15460	Q60716
RefSeq (mRNA)	NM_001017974; NM_001142598; NM_001142599; NM_004199; NM_001365677 NM_001365678; NM_001365679; NM_001365680; NM_001365681	NM_001136076; NM_011031
RefSeq (protein)	NP_001017974; NP_001136070; NP_001136071; NP_004190; NP_001352606 NP_001352607; NP_001352608; NP_001352609; NP_001352610	NP_001129548; NP_035161
Location (UCSC)	Chr 5: 132.19 – 132.3 Mb	Chr 11: 53.99 – 54.02 Mb
PubMed search
- Wikidata
View/Edit Human	View/Edit Mouse

Prolyl 4-hydroxylase subunit alpha-2 is an enzyme that in humans is encoded by the P4HA2 gene.

This gene encodes a component of prolyl 4-hydroxylase, a key enzyme in collagen synthesis composed of two identical alpha subunits and two beta subunits. The encoded protein is one of several different types of alpha subunits and provides the major part of the catalytic site of the active enzyme. In collagen and related proteins, prolyl 4-hydroxylase catalyzes the formation of 4-hydroxyproline that is essential to the proper three-dimensional folding of newly synthesized procollagen chains. Alternatively spliced transcript variants encoding different isoforms have been described.
