= X-Pro dipeptidase =

Class of enzymes

Xaa-Pro dipeptidase
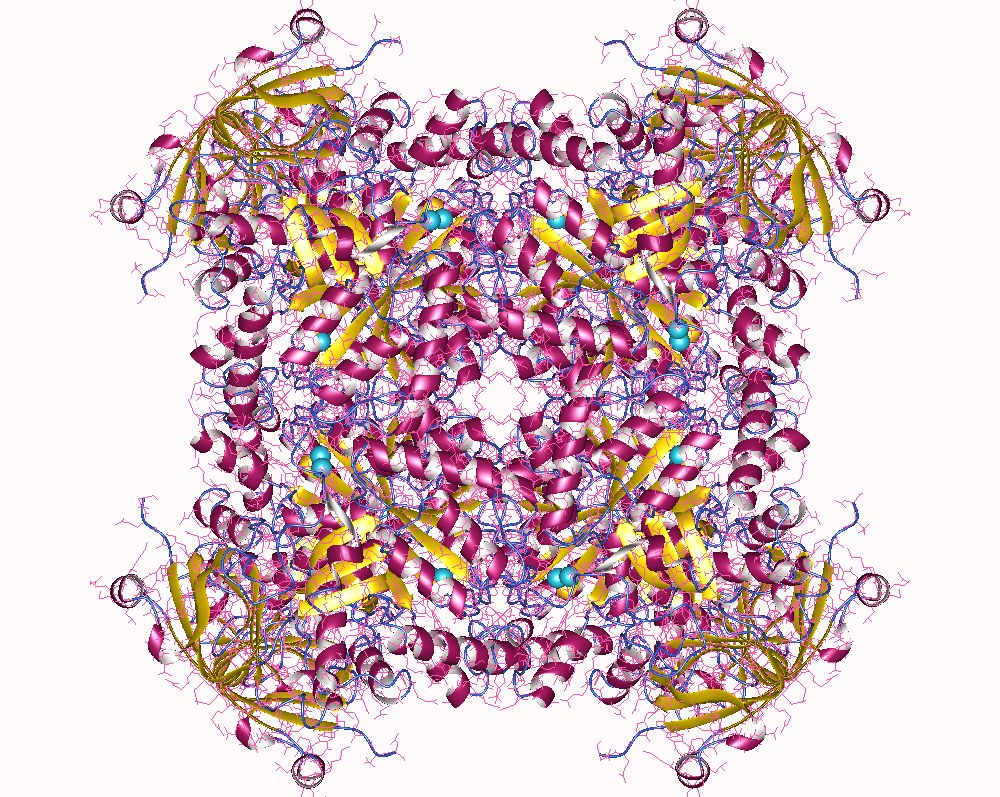
- Ochratoxinase oktamer, Aspergillus niger

Identifiers
- EC no.: 3.4.13.9
- CAS no.: 9025-32-5

Databases
- IntEnz: IntEnz view
- BRENDA: BRENDA entry
- ExPASy: NiceZyme view
- KEGG: KEGG entry
- MetaCyc: metabolic pathway
- PRIAM: profile
- PDB structures: RCSB PDB PDBe PDBsum
Search
- PMC: articles
- PubMed: articles
- NCBI: proteins

Xaa-Pro dipeptidase (EC 3.4.13.9, prolidase, imidodipeptidase, proline dipeptidase, peptidase D, gamma-peptidase) is an enzyme. This enzyme catalyses the following chemical reaction

Hydrolysis of Xaa!Pro dipeptides; also acts on aminoacyl-hydroxyproline analogs

This enzyme is Mn^{2+}-activated.
