= Delta1-piperideine-2-carboxylate reductase =

delta1-piperideine-2-carboxylate reductase

Identifiers
- EC no.: 1.5.1.21
- CAS no.: 52037-88-4

Databases
- IntEnz: IntEnz view
- BRENDA: BRENDA entry
- ExPASy: NiceZyme view
- KEGG: KEGG entry
- MetaCyc: metabolic pathway
- PRIAM: profile
- PDB structures: RCSB PDB PDBe PDBsum
- Gene Ontology: AmiGO / QuickGO
Search
- PMC: articles
- PubMed: articles
- NCBI: proteins

In enzymology, Delta1-piperideine-2-carboxylate reductase (EC 1.5.1.21) is an enzyme that catalyzes the chemical reaction

(-)-pipecolic acid
+ NADP^{+}
H^{+}
H^{+}
1-piperideine-2-carboxylic acid
+ NADPH

The two substrates of this enzyme are (–)-pipecolic acid and oxidised nicotinamide adenine dinucleotide phosphate (NADP^{+}). Its products are 1-piperideine-2-carboxylic acid, reduced NADPH, and a proton.

This enzyme belongs to the family of oxidoreductases, specifically those acting on the CH-NH group of donors with NAD+ or NADP+ as acceptor. The systematic name of this enzyme class is L-pipecolate:NADP+ 2-oxidoreductase. Other names in common use include 1,2-didehydropipecolate reductase, P2C reductase, and 1,2-didehydropipecolic reductase. This enzyme participates in lysine degradation.
