= Pyrrole-2-carboxylate decarboxylase =

Class of enzymes

Identifiers
- EC no.: 4.1.1.93

Databases
- BRENDA: enzyme data
- ExPASy: NiceZyme view
- KEGG: enzyme entry
- MetaCyc: metabolic pathway
- Rhea: reactions
- PDB structures: RCSB PDB PDBe PDBsum
Search
- PMC: articles
- PubMed: articles
- NCBI: proteins

Pyrrole-2-carboxylate decarboxylase (EC 4.1.1.93) is an enzyme characterised from Bacillus megaterium with systematic name pyrrole-2-carboxylate carboxy-lyase. It catalyses the decarboxylation of pyrrole-2-carboxylic acid to pyrrole and carbon dioxide. It can also perform carboxylation in the reverse direction, which is analogous to the Kolbe–Schmitt reaction.

pyrrole-2-carboxylic acid
CO_{2}
HCO_{3}^{−}
pyrrole

The enzyme requires an organic acid such as acetic acid or butyric acid for functionality. In the forward direction it releases carbon dioxide but bicarbonate is the best source of carbon for the reverse reaction.

Biosynthetic pathways involving this enzyme have been suggested for the sustainable production of aromatic derivatives.
