= C2H3NO2 =

The molecular formula C_{2}H_{3}NO_{2} (molar mass: 73.051 g/mol) may refer to:

- Nitroethylene
- Dehydroglycine
