= PEPD =

Protein-coding gene in the species Homo sapiens

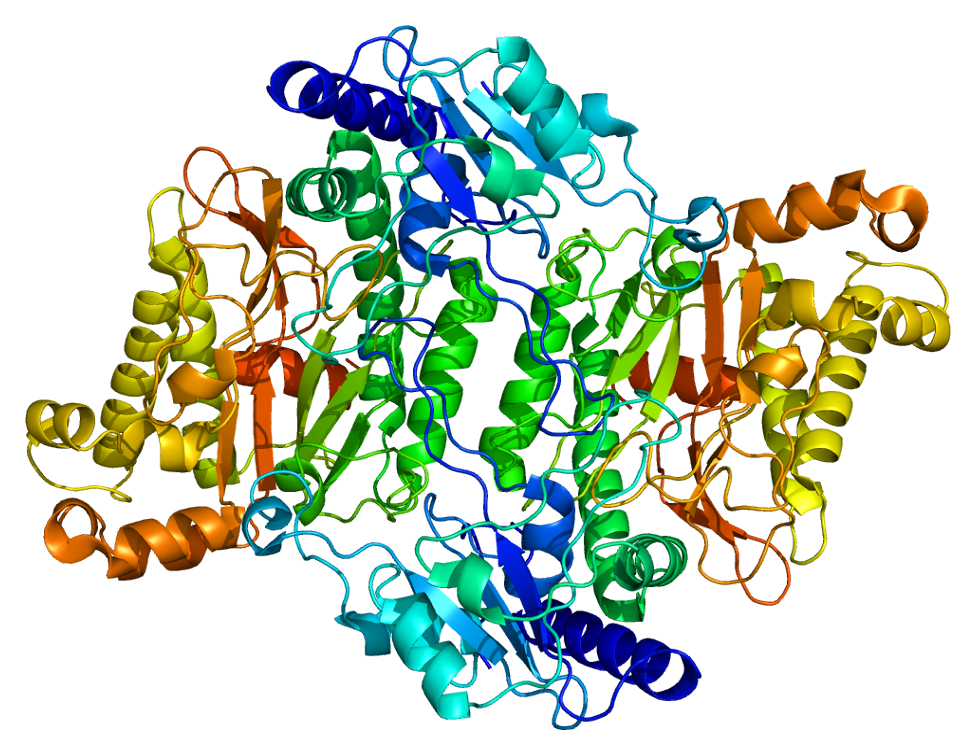

Identifiers
- Aliases: PEPD, PROLIDASE, peptidase D
- External IDs: OMIM: 613230; MGI: 97542; GeneCards: PEPD
Available structures
PDB	Ortholog search: PDBe RCSB
PDB	List of PDB id codes 2IW2, 2OKN
Enzyme activity
EC #	BRENDA	ExPASy	KEGG	MetaCyc
3.4.13.9	↗	↗	↗	↗

Gene location (Human)
Chr.	Chromosome 19 (human)
Band	19q13.11	Start	33,386,950 bp
Band	19q13.11	End	33,521,791 bp

Gene location (Mouse)
Chr.	Chromosome 7 (mouse)
Band	7 B2|7 20.7 cM	Start	34,611,804 bp
Band	7 B2|7 20.7 cM	End	34,744,133 bp
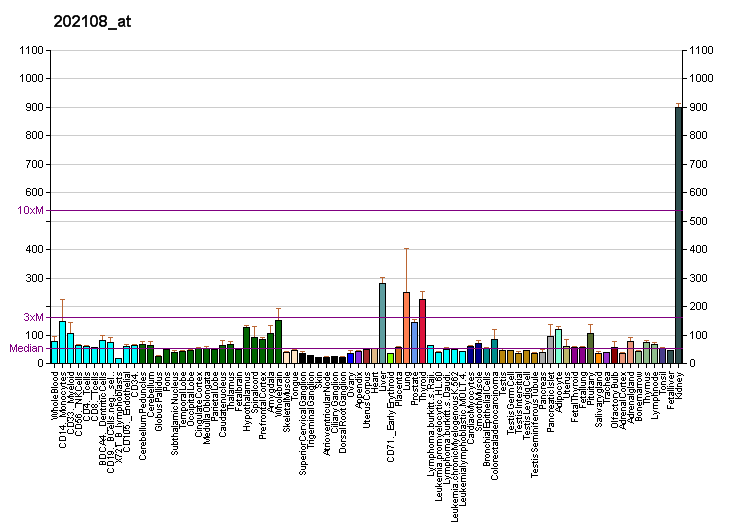
RNA expression pattern
Bgee	Human / Mouse (ortholog); Top expressed in: mucosa of ileum; human kidney; right lobe of liver; jejunal mucosa; kidney tubule; duodenum; C1 segment; left adrenal cortex; stromal cell of endometrium; right adrenal cortex / Top expressed in: right kidney; intestinal villus; jejunum; Ileal epithelium; proximal tubule; human kidney; vestibular membrane of cochlear duct; duodenum; Paneth cell; yolk sac; More reference expression data
BioGPS	More reference expression data
Gene ontology
Molecular function	peptidase activity; aminopeptidase activity; protein binding; hydrolase activity; metallopeptidase activity; dipeptidase activity; manganese ion binding; metal ion binding; metallocarboxypeptidase activity; proline dipeptidase activity
Cellular component	extracellular exosome; nucleus; nucleoplasm
Biological process	collagen catabolic process; cellular amino acid metabolic process; proteolysis
Sources:Amigo / QuickGO
Orthologs
Databases	NCBI: entry; OMA: entry
Species	Human	Mouse
Entrez	5184	18624
Ensembl	ENSG00000124299	ENSMUSG00000063931
UniProt	P12955	Q11136
RefSeq (mRNA)	NM_001166057; NM_000285; NM_001166056	NM_008820
RefSeq (protein)	NP_000276; NP_001159528; NP_001159529	NP_032846
Location (UCSC)	Chr 19: 33.39 – 33.52 Mb	Chr 7: 34.61 – 34.74 Mb
PubMed search
- Wikidata
View/Edit Human	View/Edit Mouse

Xaa-Pro dipeptidase, also known as prolidase, is an enzyme that in humans is encoded by the PEPD gene. Prolidase is an enzyme in humans that plays a crucial role in protein metabolism and collagen recycling through the catalysis of the rate-limiting step in these chemical reactions. This enzyme is coded by the gene PEPD (peptidase D), located on chromosome 19. Serum prolidase activity is also currently being explored as a biomarker for diseases.

== Function ==
Xaa-Pro dipeptidase is a cytosolic dipeptidase that hydrolyzes dipeptides with proline or hydroxyproline at the carboxy terminus (but not Pro-Pro). It is important in collagen metabolism because of the high levels of imino acids. Mutations at the PEPD locus cause prolidase deficiency. This is characterised by Iminodipeptidurea, skin ulcers, mental retardation and recurrent infections.

Serum prolidase falls into the category of proteases, specifically exopeptidases. These EC numbers range from 3.4.11 to 3.4.19.

== Structure ==
Prolidases fall under a subclass of metallopeptidases that involve binuclear active site metal clusters. This metal cluster facilitates catalysis by serving as a substrate binding site, activating nucleophiles, and stabilizing the transition state. Furthermore, prolidases are classified under a smaller family called "pita-bread" enzymes, which cleave amido-, imido-, and amidino- containing bonds. The "pita-bread" fold, containing a metal center flanked by two well-defined substrate binding pockets enabled prolidase to specifically cleave between any non-proline amino acid and proline.

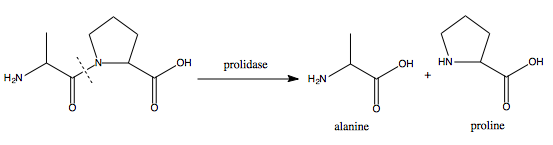

=== Pfprol ===
The first ever solved structure of prolidase came from the hyperthermophilic archaeon Pyrococcus furiosus (Pfprol). This dimer has a crystal structure shows two approximately symmetrical monomers that both have an N-terminal domain, made up of a six-stranded mixed β-sheet flanked by five α-helices, a helical linker, and C-terminal domain, consisting of a mixed six-stranded β-sheet flanked by four α-helices. The curved β-sheet of Domain II has a "pita-bread" fold. The active site lies on the inner surface of the β-sheet of Domain II, with a notable dinuclear Co cluster anchored by the side chains of two aspartate residues (Asp209 and Asp220), two glutamate residues (Glu313 and Glu327), and a histidine residue (His284). Carboxylate groups of aspartate and glutamine residues serve as bridges between the two Co atoms. In the crystallization process, the Co atoms are replaced with Zn, which hinders enzymatic activity.

Sequence homology between human and Pfprol yield only 25% identity and 43% similarity.

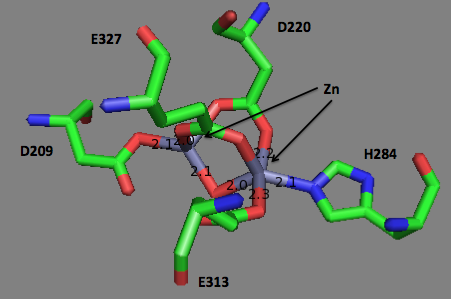
Asp209, Asp220, Glu313, Glu327, and His284 make up the active site of prolidase from Pyrococcus furiosus (1PV9). The zinc ions are bridged by the carboxylate groups of aspartate and glutamine residues. Bond lengths between the zinc ions and carboxylate groups of the amino acids are also indicated.

=== Human serum prolidase ===
Two 493 amino acid chains construct serum prolidase, held together with C2 symmetry. This C2 symmetry refers to the molecule's two-fold rotational symmetry without mirror symmetry. Simply put, if serum prolidase were to be rotated at a 180º angle, it would look the same, however, it does not look the same in a mirror image. Furthermore, this structure has two domains: the N-terminal domain and the C-terminal domain, the latter of which carries the active site in the amino acid residues 185-493. The active site is the area on the enzyme to which the substrate binds and catalysis occurs. This C-terminal domain has the ability to covalently bond to other prolidase enzymes to create a tetramer through disulfide bonds. This domain performs a "pita-bread" fold, consisting of a bimetallic active center held together by two ɑ-helices and one antiparallel β-sheet. Prolidase enzyme is considered homodimeric, meaning it is formed by two identical polypeptide chains. There are both hydrophilic and hydrophobic residues in this enzyme, distributed evenly throughout.

Manganese ions (Mn^{2+}) are utilized by serum prolidase as co-factors. Research into the crystal structure has found that two Mn^{2+} ions are required for the catalytic activity of this enzyme. This requirement leads to prolidase being deemed a metal-activated peptidase, a term used to describe enzymes that catalyze the hydrolysis reaction changing peptides into amino acids having increased ability through the existence of metal ions. It has been indicated that one Mn^{2+} ion is tightly bound to His370, while the second is loosely bound to Asp276.

Human prolidase has four crystal structures, HsProl-Mn, HsProl-Na-GlyPro, HsProl-Mg-LeuPro, and HsProl-Mn-Pro. The first of these structures, HsProl-Mn, pertains to the activity of serum prolidase before binding the substrate. Furthermore, HsProl-Na-GlyPro results from substrate degradation caused by the exchange of the Mn^{2+} ion with Na^{+}. This is caused by the substrate GlyPro binding to the enzyme. The third crystal structure of serum prolidase is HsProl-Mg-LeuPro. This structure functions similarly to HsProl-Na-GlyPro; however, the substrate utilized in this structure is LeuPro. Additionally, Mn^{2+} is replaced by Mg^{2+}. These differences cause the structure to be more stable with a lower turnover rate. The final crystal structure of serum prolidase is HsProl-Mn-Pro, which employs Pro as the substrate. This Pro comes from the reaction being catalyzed by this enzyme. The crystal structure of prolidase is well-researched and recorded in the Protein Data Bank.

== Function ==
The role of prolidase in human physiology is collagen breakdown. Collagen, the most prevalent protein in the human body, is necessary for maintaining strong connective tissues, cellular proliferation, and wound healing, among other functions. As collagen is degraded, dipeptides are released as a byproduct. Serum prolidase absorbs and digests these byproducts so they can be reused in collagen production. Proline is required for collagen production, further indicating the necessity of serum prolidase, as proline is a product of the prolidase reaction. Wound healing is a paramount function in maintaining good health of the human body. Collagen uses its rigid properties to structurally support wounds and speed up the healing process. As the wound heals, type III collagen is produced by fibroblasts, which is later replaced by type II collagen, then type I collagen. These changes indicate different stages of the wound-healing process.

Due to proline's cyclic structure, only few peptidases could cleave the bond between proline and other amino acids. Along with prolinase, prolidase are the only known enzymes that can break down dipeptides to yield free proline. Prolidase serve to hydrolyze both dietary and endogenous Xaa-Pro dipeptides. More specifically, it is essential in catalyzing the last step of the degradation of procollagen, collagen, and other proline-containing peptides into free amino acids to be used for cellular growth. Additionally, it also participates in the process of recycling proline from Xaa-Pro dipeptides for collagen resynthesis. Proline and hydroyxyproline make up a quarter of the amino acid residues in collagen, which is the most abundant protein in the body by mass and plays an important role in maintaining connective tissue in the body.

== Mechanism ==
Biochemical and structural analyses of aminopeptidase (APPro), methionine aminopeptidase (MetAP), and prolidase, all members of the "pita-bread" metalloenzymes, suggest that they share a common mechanism scheme. The main difference arises in the location of the carbonyl oxygen atom of the scissile peptide bond.

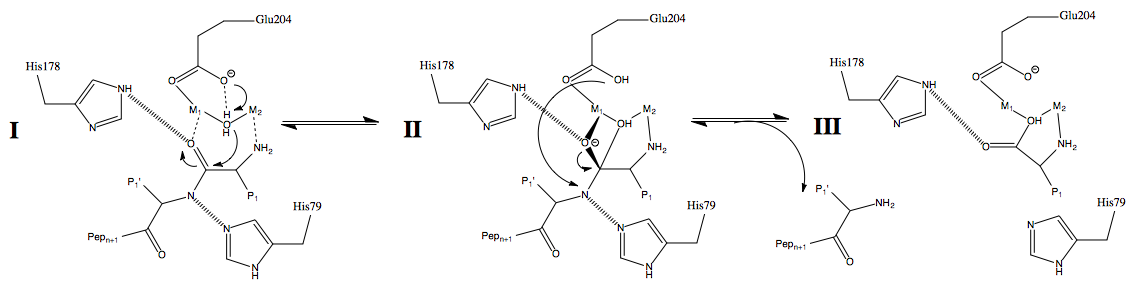
Proposed mechanism scheme for metal-dependent "pita-bread" enzyme with eMetAP residue numbering.

The following mechanism shows a proposed scheme for a metal-dependent "pita-bread" enzyme with residue numbering corresponding to those found in methionine aminopeptidase from E. coli. As shown in Intermediate I of the figure, three potential acidic amino acid residues interact with the N-terminus of the substrate in a fashion that is yet to be determined. The carbonyl and amide groups of the scissile peptide bond interact with the first metal ion, M1, in addition to His178 and His79, respectively. M1 and Glu204 activate a water molecule to prepare it nucleophilic attack at the carbonyl carbon of the scissile peptide bond. Then, the tetrahedral intermediate (Intermediate II) becomes stabilized from interactions with M1 and His178. Lastly, Glu204 donates a proton to the amine of the leaving peptide (P1'). This leads to the breakdown of the intermediate (Intermediate III), which retains its interactions with M1 and His178.

The reaction pathway of prolidase is a fairly complicated process with many components involved. After a proton is removed from the bridge between the two Mn^{2+} ions, the GlyPro substrate causes a conformational change as it binds to the active site. This GlyPro is held in place by hydrogen bonds formed by multiple amino acids in this structure. The Gly-N atom of the GlyPro substrate and the Gly-O atom of the peptide bond each interact with the Mn^{2+} ions, which are stabilized by additional amino acids, leading to polarization. This reaction causes the carbonyl carbon atom located on the peptide bond to receive a positive charge, which then reacts with the hydroxide ion formed by the Mn^{2+} ions, creating a tetrahedral intermediate. A conformational change occurs, releasing the initial product glycine while the protein is still closed. An additional conformation change from closed to open occurs when proline, the final product of this reaction, is released.

== Regulation ==
Post-translational modifications of prolidase regulate its enzymatic abilities. Phosphorylation of prolidase has been shown to increase its activity while dephosphorylation leads to a decrease in enzyme activity. Analysis of known consensus sequence required for serine/threonine phosphorylation revealed that prolidase contains at least three potential sites for serine/threonine phosphorylation. Nitric oxide, both exogenously acquired and endogenously generated, was shown to increase prolidase activity in a time- and dose-dependent manner via phosphorylation at these serine and threonine sites. Additionally, prolidase may also be regulated at tyrosine phosphorylation sites, which are mediated by FAK and MAPK signaling pathways.

== Disease relevance ==
The presence of serum prolidase in the blood is a good indicator of the presence and severity of many types of diseases. For instance, Type 2 Diabetes mellitus patients have elevated levels of serum prolidase. This is expected because high blood glucose leads to a decrease in collagen production and inflammatory cell generation, which depreciates wound healing ability. Furthermore, Rheumatoid Arthritis, Ankylosing spondylitis, and benign joint hypermobility syndrome have corresponded with low serum prolidase levels. Prolidase has become a prominent marker of cancer progression in patients with various types of cancer. Depending on the elevated levels of serum prolidase in the blood, physicians are able to determine tumor size, stage of cancer, and prognosis, all of which help significantly in treating these diseases.

Analysis of serum prolidase levels has been used to detect the severity of liver disease in some instances. Research has indicated the correlation between chronic liver diseases and serum prolidase. For instance, one study suggested an increase in serum prolidase levels during the initial stages of cirrhotic liver fibrosis, followed by a decrease as the disease progressed. Moreover, analysis of serum prolidase levels in alcoholic hepatitis patients has displayed higher levels compared to cirrhosis patients.

Serum prolidase is a highly necessary enzyme in the human body. Through its many functions, most notably collagen recycling, prolidase is widely used in the overall metabolism of humans. The reaction pathway of this enzyme is key in regulating the synthesis and degradation of collagen, a vital protein necessary for multiple aspects of the body. Irregular levels of serum prolidase in the blood are indicative of various diseases and conditions in humans.

Deficiency in prolidase leads to a rare, severe autosomal recessive disorder (prolidase deficiency) that causes many chronic, debilitating health conditions in humans. These phenotypical symptoms vary and may include skin ulcerations, mental retardation, splenomegaly, recurrent infections, photosensitivity, hyperkeratosis, and unusual facial appearance. Furthermore, prolidase activity was found to be abnormal compared to healthy levels in various medical conditions including but limited to: bipolar disorder, breast cancer, endometrial cancer, keloid scar formation, erectile dysfunction, liver disease, lung cancer, hypertension, melanoma, and chronic pancreatitis. In some cancers with increased levels of prolidase activity, such as melanoma, the differential expression of prolidase and its substrate specificity for dipeptides with proline at the carboxyl end suggests the potential of prolidase in becoming a viable, selective endogenous enzyme target for proline prodrugs. Serum prolidase enzyme activity is also currently being explored as a possible, reliable marker for diseases including chronic hepatitis B and liver fibrosis.

== Other applications ==
Decontamination: Prolidase from the hyperthermophilic archaeon Pyrococcus furiosus (Pfprol) shows potential for application in decontamination of organophosphorus nerve agents in chemical warfare agents. Additionally, prolidase could also serve to detect fluorine-containing organophosphorus neurotoxins, like the G-type chemical warfare agents, and could antagonize organophosphorous intoxication and protect against the effects of diisopropylfluorophosphate when encapsulated in liposomes.
