= Pyrrole-2-carboxylate monooxygenase =

Class of enzymes

Identifiers
- EC no.: 1.14.13.130

Databases
- IntEnz: IntEnz view
- BRENDA: BRENDA entry
- ExPASy: NiceZyme view
- KEGG: KEGG entry
- MetaCyc: metabolic pathway
- PRIAM: profile
- PDB structures: RCSB PDB PDBe PDBsum
Search
- PMC: articles
- PubMed: articles
- NCBI: proteins

Pyrrole-2-carboxylate monooxygenase (EC 1.14.13.130, pyrrole-2-carboxylate oxygenase) is an enzyme with systematic name pyrrole-2-carboxylate,NADH:oxygen oxidoreductase (5-hydroxylating). This enzyme catalyses the following chemical reaction

Pyrrole-2-carboxylic acid
+ NADH + H^{+}
O_{2}
H_{2}O
5-Hydroxypyrrole-2-carboxylic acid
+ NAD^{+}

The four substrates of this enzyme are pyrrole-2-carboxylic acid, reduced nicotinamide adenine dinucleotide (NADH), oxygen, and a proton. Its products are 5-hydroxypyrrole-2-carboxylic acid, oxidised NAD^{+}, and water. It is a flavoprotein that uses flavin adenine dinucleotide as a cofactor.
