= CRYM =

Protein-coding gene in the species Homo sapiens

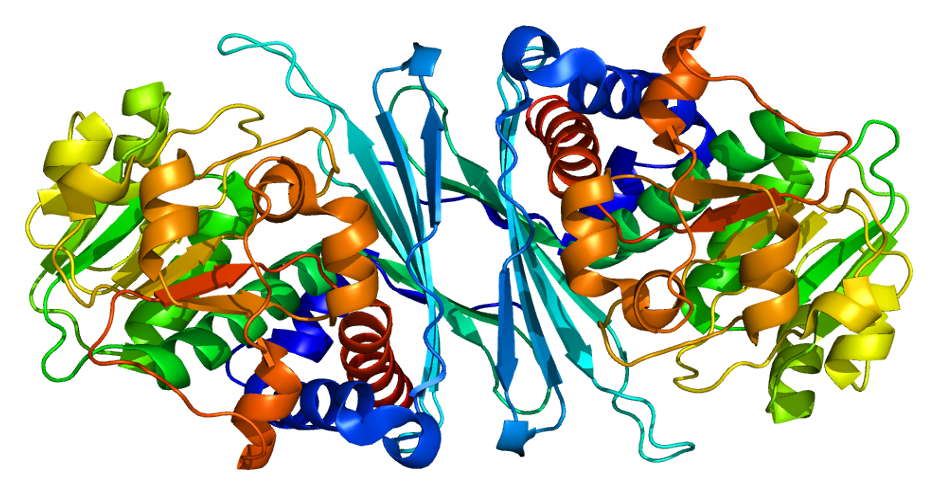
Available structures
PDB	Ortholog search: PDBe RCSB
PDB	List of PDB id codes 2I99

Identifiers
- Aliases: CRYM, DFNA40, THBP, crystallin mu
- External IDs: OMIM: 123740; MGI: 102675; HomoloGene: 1424; GeneCards: CRYM; OMA:CRYM - orthologs

Gene location (Human)
Chr.	Chromosome 16 (human)
Band	16p12.2	Start	21,238,874 bp
Band	16p12.2	End	21,303,083 bp

Gene location (Mouse)
Chr.	Chromosome 7 (mouse)
Band	7 F2|7 64.47 cM	Start	119,785,603 bp
Band	7 F2|7 64.47 cM	End	119,801,334 bp
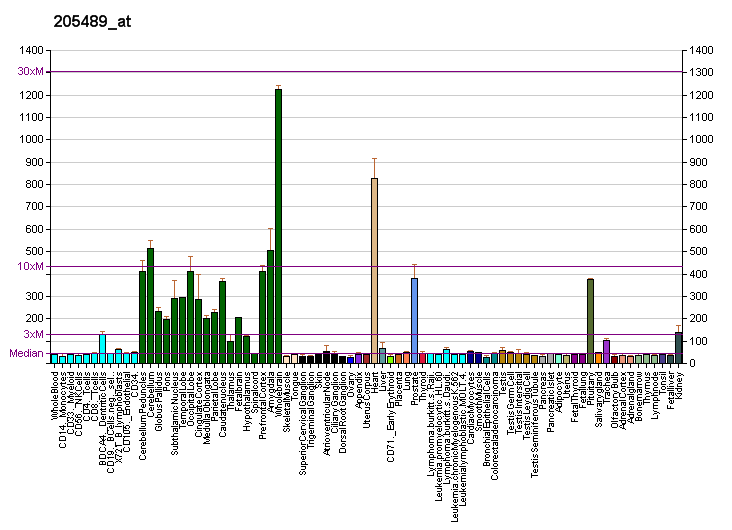
RNA expression pattern
Bgee	Human / Mouse (ortholog); Top expressed in: cerebellar vermis; frontal pole; paraflocculus of cerebellum; right hemisphere of cerebellum; Brodmann area 10; orbitofrontal cortex; apex of heart; nucleus accumbens; Brodmann area 9; right frontal lobe / Top expressed in: dentate gyrus of hippocampal formation granule cell; hippocampus proper; olfactory tubercle; nucleus accumbens; subiculum; lip; dorsal striatum; Region I of hippocampus proper; superior frontal gyrus; CA3 field; More reference expression data
BioGPS	More reference expression data
Gene ontology
Molecular function	oxidoreductase activity; hormone binding; protein binding; protein homodimerization activity; transcription corepressor activity; NADP binding; thyroid hormone binding; thiomorpholine-carboxylate dehydrogenase activity; oxidoreductase activity, acting on the CH-NH2 group of donors, NAD or NADP as acceptor
Cellular component	cytoplasm; extracellular exosome; mitochondrion; nucleus; peroxisomal matrix; cytosol
Biological process	thyroid hormone transport; negative regulation of transcription by RNA polymerase II; hearing; lysine catabolic process; thyroid hormone metabolic process
Sources:Amigo / QuickGO
Orthologs
Species	Human	Mouse
Entrez	1428	12971
Ensembl	ENSG00000103316	ENSMUSG00000030905
UniProt	Q14894	O54983
RefSeq (mRNA)	NM_001014444; NM_001888; NM_001376256	NM_016669
RefSeq (protein)	NP_001879; NP_001363185	NP_057878
Location (UCSC)	Chr 16: 21.24 – 21.3 Mb	Chr 7: 119.79 – 119.8 Mb
PubMed search
- Wikidata
View/Edit Human	View/Edit Mouse

Mu-crystallin homolog also known as NADP-regulated thyroid-hormone-binding protein (THBP) is a protein that in humans is encoded by the CRYM gene. Multiple alternatively spliced transcript variants have been found for this gene.

== Function ==
Crystallins are separated into two classes: taxon-specific and ubiquitous. The former class is also called phylogenetically restricted crystallins. The latter class constitutes the major proteins of vertebrate eye lens and maintains the transparency and refractive index of the lens. This gene encodes a taxon-specific crystallin protein that binds NADPH and has sequence similarity to bacterial ornithine cyclodeaminases. The encoded protein does not perform a structural role in lens tissue, and instead it binds thyroid hormone for possible regulatory or developmental roles.

Its enzyme function has been determined as a ketimine reductase, reducing cyclic ketimines to their reduced forms. Either NADH or NADPH can be used as cofactor. The most active substrate at pH 5.0 is aminoethylcysteine ketimine (AECK), however at neutral pH (pH 7.2) the most active substrate is 1-piperideine-2-carboxylate which is an important part of the pipecolic acid pathway. The active form of thyroxine, T_{3}, has been found to be a potent inhibitor at nanomolar concentrations.

Besides its role in lens biology, CRYM seems also to be involved in thyroid hormone signalling in other tissues. It could be demonstrated that CRYM mutations may cause deafness through thyroid hormone binding effects on the fibrocytes of the cochlea. Disruption of the CRYM gene leads to decreased T_{3} concentrations in both tissues and serum without alteration of peripheral T_{3} action in vivo.

The existence of intracellular thyroid hormone binding proteins has been postulated from mathematical modelling of pituitary-thyroid homeostasis. Binding properties have been assumed to be similar to those of extracellular binding proteins, however it is not clear, if THBP is the only intracellular thyroid hormone binding protein.
