= Dehydroglycine =

Names
- IUPAC name 2-Iminoacetic acid
- Other names Glycine imine, iminoacetic acid

Identifiers
CAS Number	4472-12-2
3D model (JSmol)	Interactive image
ChEBI	CHEBI:53647
ChemSpider	13375419
Gmelin Reference	1780785
KEGG	C15809
PubChem CID	3080609
CompTox Dashboard (EPA)	DTXSID501344248
- InChI: InChI=1S/C2H3NO2/c3-1-2(4)5/h1,3H,(H,4,5) Key: TVMUHOAONWHJBV-UHFFFAOYSA-N
- SMILES: C(=N)C(=O)O

Properties
Chemical formula	C_{2}H_{3}NO_{2}
Molar mass	73.051 g·mol^{−1}
- Except where otherwise noted, data are given for materials in their standard state (at 25 °C [77 °F], 100 kPa). Infobox references

Dehydroglycine is the organic compound with the formula HNCHCO_{2}H. This rarely observed species is invoked as the product of oxidation (dehydrogenation) of glycine by glycine oxidase (ThiO), which is a step in the biosynthesis of thiamin. It is also invoked as a product of the radical SAM-induced fragmentation of tyrosine. It is an imino acid.
