= Hydroxylation =

Chemical reaction which adds an –OH group to an organic compound

In chemistry, hydroxylation refers to the installation of a hydroxyl group (−OH) into an organic compound. Hydroxylations generate alcohols and phenols, which are very common functional groups. Hydroxylation confers some degree of water-solubility. Hydroxylation of a hydrocarbon is an oxidation, thus a step in degradation.

== Atmospheric hydroxylation ==
Hydroxylation via reaction with tropospheric hydroxyl radicals and oxygen is one possible pathway for the degradation of aromatic compounds:

ArH + HO^{•} ⇌ [Ar(OH)H]^{•}
[Ar(OH)H]^{•} + O_{2} → ArOH + HO_{2}^{•}

== Biological hydroxylation ==
In biochemistry, hydroxylation reactions are often facilitated by enzymes called hydroxylases. These enzymes insert an O atom into a C−H bond. Typical stoichiometries for the hydroxylation of a generic hydrocarbon are these:

2R_{3}C−H + O_{2} → 2 R_{3}C−OH
R_{3}C−H + O_{2} + 2e^{−} + 2H^{+} → R_{3}C−OH + H_{2}O

Since O_{2} itself is a slow and unselective hydroxylating agent, catalysts are required to accelerate the pace of the process and to introduce selectivity.

Hydroxylation is important in detoxification since it converts lipophilic compounds into water-soluble (hydrophilic) products that are more readily removed by the kidneys or liver and excreted. Some drugs (for example, steroids) are activated or deactivated by hydroxylation.

The principal hydroxylation catalyst in nature is cytochrome P450, hundreds of variations of which are known. Other hydroxylating agents include flavins, alpha-ketoglutarate-dependent hydroxylases (2-oxoglutarate-dependent dioxygenases), and some diiron hydroxylases.

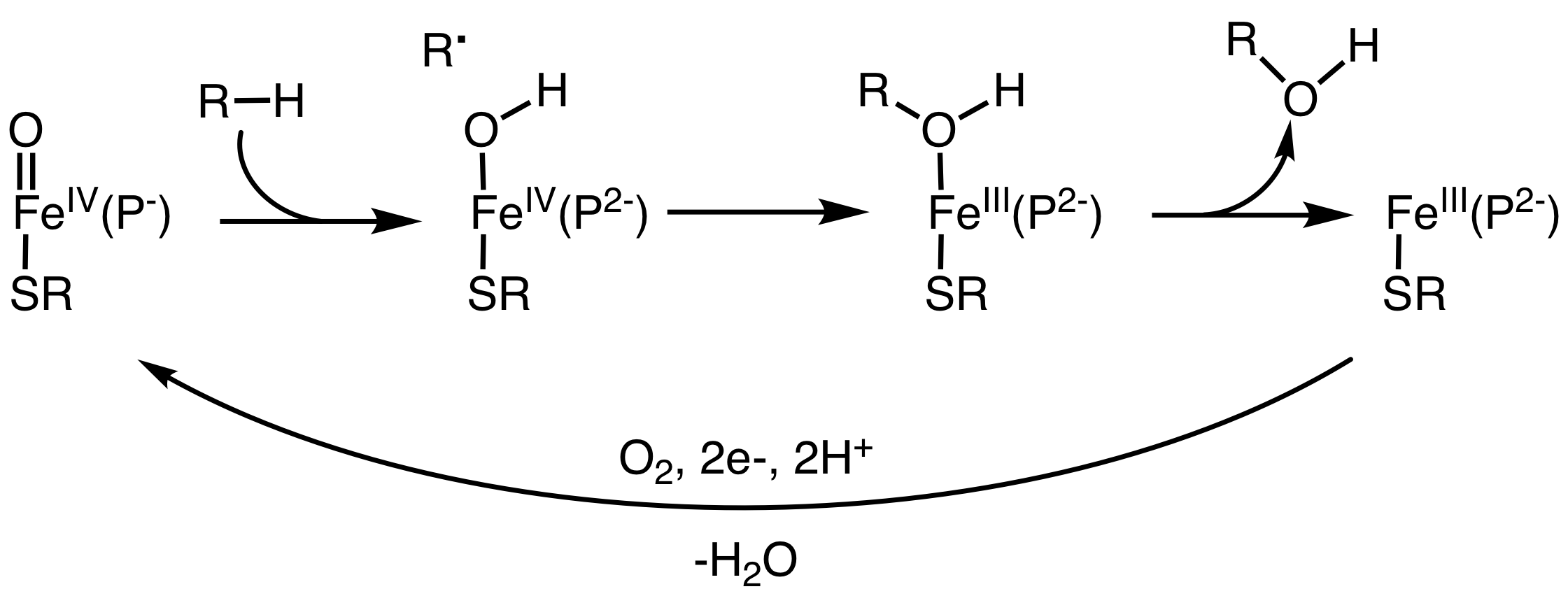
Steps in an oxygen rebound mechanism that explains many iron-catalyzed hydroxylations: H-atom abstraction, oxygen rebound, alcohol decomplexation.

=== Of proteins ===
The hydroxylation of proteins occurs as a post-translational modification and is catalyzed by 2-oxoglutarate-dependent dioxygenases. Hydroxylation improves water‐solubility, as well as affecting their structure and function.

The most frequently hydroxylated amino acid residue in human proteins is proline. This is because collagen makes up about 25–35% of the protein in our bodies and contains a hydroxyproline at almost every 3rd residue in its amino acid sequence. Collagen consists of both 3‐hydroxyproline and 4‐hydroxyproline residues. Hydroxylation occurs at the γ-C atom, forming hydroxyproline (Hyp), which stabilizes the secondary structure of collagen due to the strong electronegative effects of oxygen. Proline hydroxylation is also a vital component of hypoxia response via hypoxia inducible factors. In some cases, proline may be hydroxylated instead on its β-C atom. These three reactions are catalyzed by large, multi-subunit enzymes prolyl 4-hydroxylase, prolyl 3-hydroxylase, and lysyl 5-hydroxylase, respectively. These enzymes require iron (as well as molecular oxygen and α-ketoglutarate). They consume oxygen (the oxidant) and ascorbic acid (vitamin C, the reductant). Deprivation of ascorbate leads to deficiencies in proline hydroxylation, which leads to less stable collagen, which can manifest itself as the disease scurvy. Since citrus fruits are rich in vitamin C, British sailors were given limes to combat scurvy on long ocean voyages; hence, they were called "limeys".

Several other amino acids aside from proline are susceptible to hydroxylation, especially lysine, asparagine, aspartate, and histidine. Lysine may be hydroxylated on its δ-C atom, forming hydroxylysine (Hyl). Several endogenous proteins contain hydroxyphenylalanine and hydroxytyrosine residues. These residues are formed by hydroxylation of phenylalanine and tyrosine, a process in which the hydroxylation converts phenylalanine residues into tyrosine residues. Hydroxylation at C-3 of tyrosine gives 3,4- dihydroxyphenylalanine (DOPA), which is a precursor to hormones and can be converted into dopamine.

=== Hydroxylation enzymes ===
- 17α-Hydroxylase
- Cholesterol 7 alpha-hydroxylase
- Dopamine beta-hydroxylase
- Phenylalanine hydroxylase
- Tyrosine hydroxylase

== Synthetic hydroxylations ==
Hydroxylations are well explored but only rarely practical in organic synthesis. Peroxytrifluoroacetic acid converts some arenes to phenols. Salts of peroxydisulfate converts phenols to quinols in the Elbs persulfate oxidation. Mixtures of ferrous sulfate and hydrogen peroxide, the Fenton reagent, behaves similarly.

Installing hydroxyl groups into organic compounds can be effected by biomimetic catalysts, i.e. catalysts whose design is inspired by enzymes such as cytochrome P450.

Whereas many hydroxylations insert O atoms into C−H bonds, some reactions add OH groups to unsaturated substrates. The Sharpless dihydroxylation is such a reaction: it converts alkenes into diols. The hydroxy groups are provided by hydrogen peroxide, which adds across the double bond of alkenes.

== Hydroxylation of methane ==
Methane is one of the most studied substrates for hydroxylation because it is abundant in natural gas. Although methane has value as a fuel, converting it to methanol can yield higher value. Studies on the hydroxylation of methane spans both synthetic and biological approaches. Nature has evolved enzymes called methane monooxygenases, which are efficient but impractical for commercial applications. Instead, synthetic catalysts have received much attention, but they too are not yet of practical value.
