= Imino acid =

Organic compound

1-Pyrroline-5-carboxylic acid, an N-substituted imino acid

In organic chemistry, an imino acid is any molecule that contains both imine (>C=NH) and carboxyl (-C(=O)-OH) functional groups.

Imino group attached to carbon

Carboxylic acid

The two functional groups that together define an imino acid

Imino acids are structurally related to amino acids, which have amino group instead of imine—a difference of single vs double-bond between nitrogen and carbon. The simplest example is dehydroglycine.

D-Amino acid oxidase is an enzyme that is able to convert amino acids into imino acids. Also the direct biosynthetic precursor to the amino acid proline is the imino acid (S)-Δ^{1}-pyrroline-5-carboxylate (P5C).

== Related terminology ==
proline

Secondary amino acids, amino acids containing a secondary amine group are sometimes named imino acids, though this usage is obsolescent. The only proteinogenic amino acid of this type is proline, although the related non-proteinogenic amino acids hydroxyproline and pipecolic acid have often been included in studies of this class of compounds.

The term imino acid is also the obsolete term for imidic acids, structures containing the -C(=NH)-OH group, and should not be used for them.
