= L-pipecolate oxidase =

Identifiers
- EC no.: 1.5.3.7
- CAS no.: 81669-65-0

Databases
- IntEnz: IntEnz view
- BRENDA: BRENDA entry
- ExPASy: NiceZyme view
- KEGG: KEGG entry
- MetaCyc: metabolic pathway
- PRIAM: profile
- PDB structures: RCSB PDB PDBe PDBsum
- Gene Ontology: AmiGO / QuickGO
Search
- PMC: articles
- PubMed: articles
- NCBI: proteins

L-pipecolate oxidase (EC 1.5.3.7) is an enzyme that catalyzes the chemical reaction

L-pipecolic acid
O_{2}
H_{2}O_{2}
O_{2}
H_{2}O_{2}
(2S)-2,3,4,5-tetrahydropyridine-2-carboxylic acid

The two substrates of this enzyme are L-pipecolic acid and oxygen. Its products are (2S)-2,3,4,5-tetrahydropyridine-2-carboxylic acid and hydrogen peroxide.

This enzyme belongs to the family of oxidoreductases, specifically those acting on the CH-NH group of donors with oxygen as acceptor. The systematic name of this enzyme class is L-pipecolate:oxygen 1,6-oxidoreductase. Other names in common use include pipecolate oxidase, and L-pipecolic acid oxidase.

In water, the product is hydrolysed to L-allysine, which can be converted to L-lysine in the yeasts such as Rhodotorula glutinis in which the enzyme is found.

product
H_{2}O
H_{2}O
L-allysine
L-lysine
