= Thiomorpholine-carboxylate dehydrogenase =

thiomorpholine-carboxylate dehydrogenase

Identifiers
- EC no.: 1.5.1.25
- CAS no.: 115232-54-7

Databases
- IntEnz: IntEnz view
- BRENDA: BRENDA entry
- ExPASy: NiceZyme view
- KEGG: KEGG entry
- MetaCyc: metabolic pathway
- PRIAM: profile
- PDB structures: RCSB PDB PDBe PDBsum
- Gene Ontology: AmiGO / QuickGO
Search
- PMC: articles
- PubMed: articles
- NCBI: proteins

In enzymology, thiomorpholine-carboxylate dehydrogenase (EC 1.5.1.25) is an enzyme that catalyzes the chemical reaction

thiomorpholine 3-carboxylate + NAD(P)+ $\rightleftharpoons$ 3,4-dehydro-thiomorpholine-3-carboxylate + NAD(P)H + H^{+}

The two substrates of this enzyme are thiomorpholine 3-carboxylate and oxidised nicotinamide adenine dinucleotide (NAD^{+}). Its products are 3,4-dehydro-thiomorpholine-3-carboxylate, reduced NADH, and a proton. Nicotinamide adenine dinucleotide phosphate can be used as an alternative cofactor.

This enzyme belongs to the family of oxidoreductases, specifically those acting on the CH-NH group of donors with NAD+ or NADP+ as acceptor. The systematic name of this enzyme class is thiomorpholine-3-carboxylate:NAD(P)+ 5,6-oxidoreductase. Other names in common use include ketimine reductase, and ketimine-reducing enzyme.

CRYM, a taxon-specific crystallin protein that also binds thyroid hormones has thiomorpholine-carboxylate dehydrogenase activity.
