= Glycine oxidase =

Class of enzymes

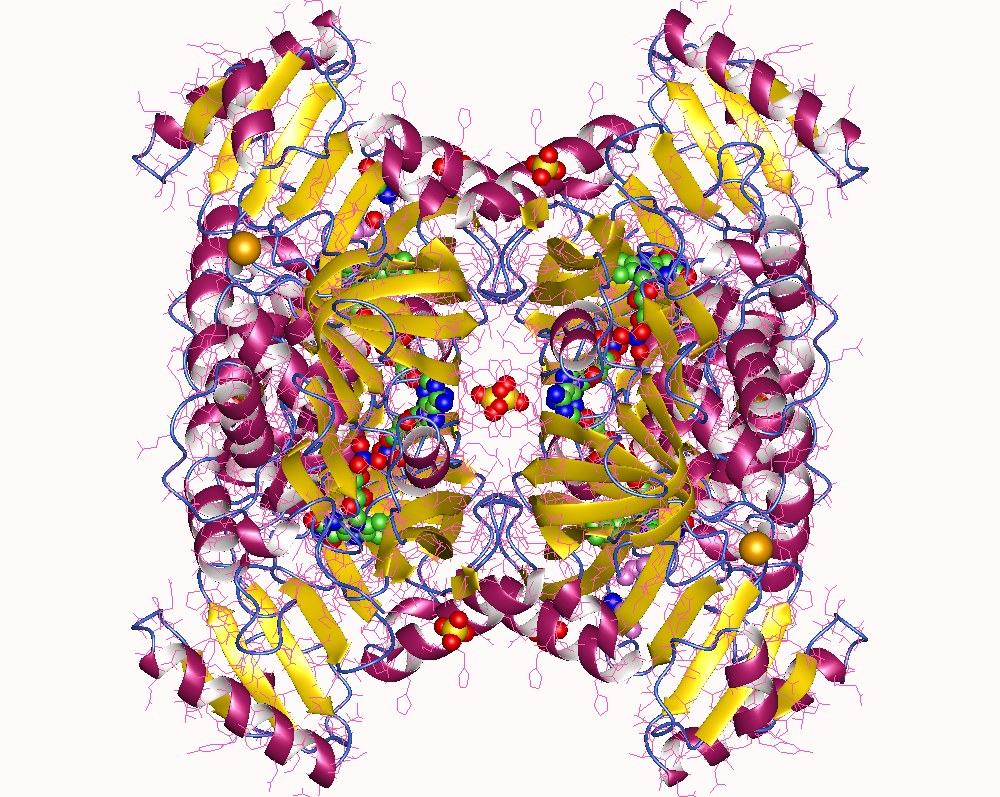
- Glycine oxidase tetramer, Geobacillus kaustophilus

Identifiers
- EC no.: 1.4.3.19
- CAS no.: 39307-16-9

Databases
- IntEnz: IntEnz view
- BRENDA: BRENDA entry
- ExPASy: NiceZyme view
- KEGG: KEGG entry
- MetaCyc: metabolic pathway
- PRIAM: profile
- PDB structures: RCSB PDB PDBe PDBsum
Search
- PMC: articles
- PubMed: articles
- NCBI: proteins

Glycine oxidase (EC 1.4.3.19) is an enzyme with systematic name glycine:oxygen oxidoreductase (deaminating). It catalyses the overall chemical reaction:

glycine
+ H_{2}O
O_{2}
H_{2}O_{2}
O_{2}
H_{2}O_{2}
glyoxylic acid
+ NH_{3}

This flavoenzyme contains non-covalently bound flavin adenine dinucleotide.
