= N-methyl-L-amino-acid oxidase =

Class of enzymes

Identifiers
- EC no.: 1.5.3.2
- CAS no.: 9029-23-6

Databases
- BRENDA: enzyme data
- ExPASy: NiceZyme view
- KEGG: enzyme entry
- MetaCyc: metabolic pathway
- Rhea: reactions
- PDB structures: RCSB PDB PDBe PDBsum
- Gene Ontology: AmiGO / QuickGO
Search
- PMC: articles
- PubMed: articles
- NCBI: proteins

N-methyl-L-amino-acid oxidase (EC 1.5.3.2) is an enzyme that catalyzes the general chemical reaction

an N-methyl-L-amino acid + H_{2}O + O_{2} $\rightleftharpoons$ an L-amino acid + formaldehyde + H_{2}O_{2}

Not all amino acids are equally effective as substrates but N-methyltryptophan (L-abrine) is an example which gives a rapid and nearly complete reaction in vitro.

N-methyltryptophan
+ H_{2}O
O_{2}
H_{2}O_{2}
O_{2}
H_{2}O_{2}
tryptophan
+ H_{2}C=O

The enzyme is a flavoprotein that uses flavin adenine dinucleotide as its cofactor. It requires oxygen, which is converted to hydrogen peroxide, while the methyl group becomes formaldehyde.

== Nomenclature ==
This enzyme belongs to the family of oxidoreductases, specifically those acting on the CH-NH group of donors with oxygen as acceptor. The systematic name of this enzyme class is N-methyl-L-amino-acid:oxygen oxidoreductase (demethylating). Other names in common use include N-methylamino acid oxidase, and demethylase.
