= RWDD3 =

Protein-coding gene in humans

Identifiers
- Aliases: RWDD3, RSUME, RWD domain containing 3
- External IDs: OMIM: 615875; MGI: 1920420; GeneCards: RWDD3
Available structures
PDB	Ortholog search: PDBe RCSB
PDB	List of PDB id codes 2EBK, 4Y1L

Gene location (Human)
Chr.	Chromosome 1 (human)
Band	1p21.3	Start	95,234,210 bp
Band	1p21.3	End	95,247,225 bp

Gene location (Mouse)
Chr.	Chromosome 3 (mouse)
Band	3|3 G1	Start	120,949,047 bp
Band	3|3 G1	End	120,965,344 bp
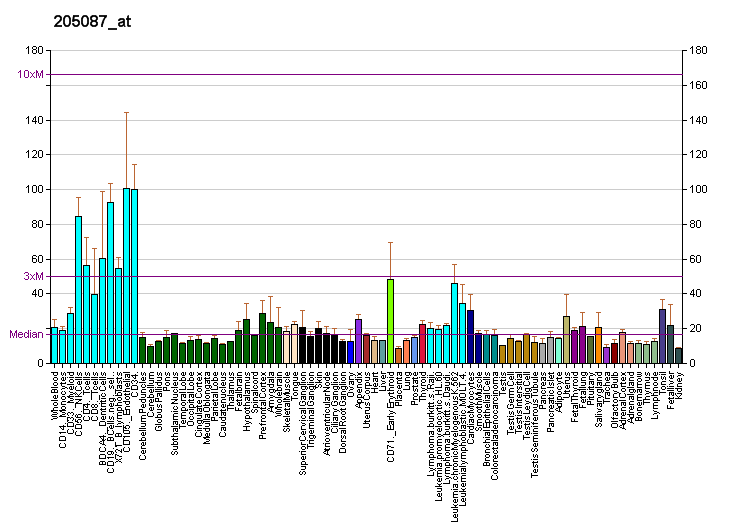
RNA expression pattern
Bgee	Human / Mouse (ortholog); Top expressed in: endometrium; body of pancreas; Achilles tendon; right lobe of liver; nucleus accumbens; amygdala; putamen; olfactory zone of nasal mucosa; caudate nucleus; corpus callosum / Top expressed in: medial ganglionic eminence; lumbar subsegment of spinal cord; supraoptic nucleus; arcuate nucleus; ventromedial nucleus; dentate gyrus; paraventricular nucleus of hypothalamus; dorsomedial hypothalamic nucleus; median eminence; embryo; More reference expression data
BioGPS	More reference expression data
Gene ontology
Molecular function	protein binding
Cellular component	cytoplasm; nucleus
Biological process	negative regulation of NF-kappaB transcription factor activity; positive regulation of protein sumoylation; positive regulation of hypoxia-inducible factor-1alpha signaling pathway
Sources:Amigo / QuickGO
Orthologs
Databases	NCBI: entry; OMA: entry
Species	Human	Mouse
Entrez	25950	66568
Ensembl	ENSG00000122481	ENSMUSG00000028133
UniProt	Q9Y3V2	Q8VIL2
RefSeq (mRNA)	NM_001128142; NM_001199682; NM_001278247; NM_001278248; NM_015485	NM_025637; NM_028456
RefSeq (protein)	NP_001121614; NP_001186611; NP_001265176; NP_001265177; NP_056300	n/a
Location (UCSC)	Chr 1: 95.23 – 95.25 Mb	Chr 3: 120.95 – 120.97 Mb
PubMed search
- Wikidata
View/Edit Human	View/Edit Mouse

RWD domain-containing protein 3 is a protein that in humans is encoded by the RWDD3 gene.
