= SAT2 =

Protein-coding gene in the species Homo sapiens

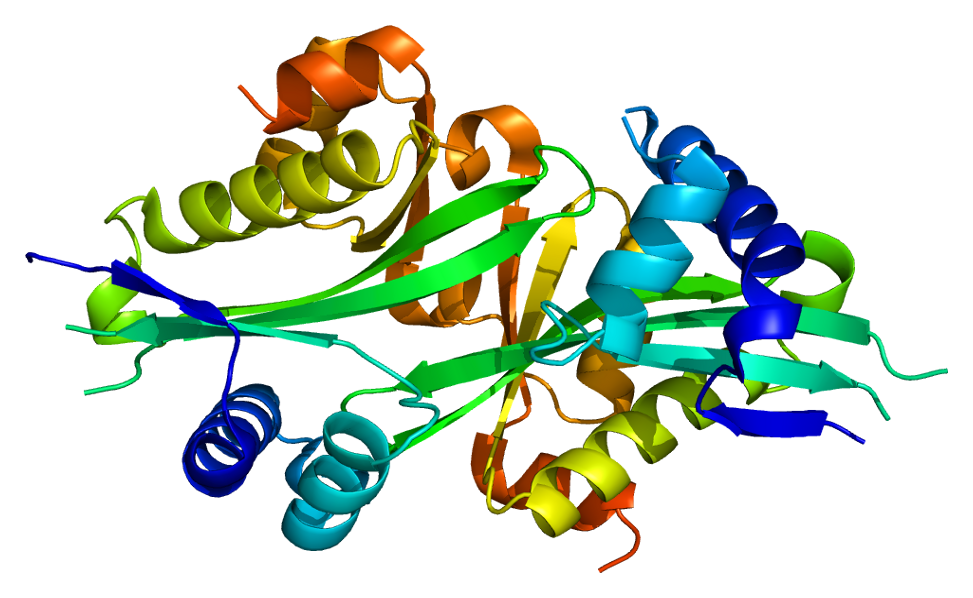

Identifiers
- Aliases: SAT2, Sspermidine/spermine N1-acetyltransferase family member 2, SSAT-2
- External IDs: OMIM: 611463; MGI: 1916465; GeneCards: SAT2
Available structures
PDB	Ortholog search: PDBe RCSB
PDB	List of PDB id codes 2BEI, 2Q4V
Enzyme activity
EC #	BRENDA	ExPASy	KEGG	MetaCyc
2.3.1.57	↗	↗	↗	↗

Gene location (Human)
Chr.	Chromosome 17 (human)
Band	17p13.1	Start	7,626,234 bp
Band	17p13.1	End	7,627,876 bp

Gene location (Mouse)
Chr.	Chromosome 11 (mouse)
Band	11|11 B3	Start	69,512,850 bp
Band	11|11 B3	End	69,514,696 bp
RNA expression pattern
Bgee	Human / Mouse (ortholog); Top expressed in: right adrenal cortex; left adrenal cortex; jejunal mucosa; right lobe of liver; mucosa of ileum; duodenum; human kidney; left ovary; right ovary; anterior pituitary / Top expressed in: otolith organ; utricle; retinal pigment epithelium; right kidney; proximal tubule; otic vesicle; Rostral migratory stream; internal carotid artery; external carotid artery; epithelium of lens; More reference expression data
BioGPS	n/a
Gene ontology
Molecular function	transferase activity; N-acetyltransferase activity; acyltransferase activity; diamine N-acetyltransferase activity; protein binding; identical protein binding; spermidine binding
Cellular component	cytoplasm; extracellular exosome
Biological process	putrescine acetylation; spermine acetylation; nor-spermidine metabolic process; spermidine acetylation; putrescine catabolic process
Sources:Amigo / QuickGO
Orthologs
Databases	NCBI: entry; OMA: entry
Species	Human	Mouse
Entrez	112483	69215
Ensembl	ENSG00000141504	ENSMUSG00000069835
UniProt	Q96F10	Q6P8J2
RefSeq (mRNA)	NM_133491; NM_001320845; NM_001320846; NM_001320847	NM_026991; NM_001356468; NM_001356469
RefSeq (protein)	NP_001307774; NP_001307775; NP_001307776; NP_597998	NP_081267; NP_001343397; NP_001343398
Location (UCSC)	Chr 17: 7.63 – 7.63 Mb	Chr 11: 69.51 – 69.51 Mb
PubMed search
- Wikidata
View/Edit Human	View/Edit Mouse

Diamine acetyltransferase 2 is an enzyme that in humans is encoded by the SAT2 gene. SAT2 maintains a key metabolic glutamine/glutamate balance underpinning retrograde signaling by dendritic release of the neurotransmitter glutamate.
