= CEP192 =

Protein-coding gene in the species Homo sapiens

Identifiers
- Aliases: CEP192, PPP1R62, centrosomal protein 192
- External IDs: OMIM: 616426; MGI: 1918049; GeneCards: CEP192
Available structures
PDB	Human UniProt search: PDBe RCSB
PDB	List of PDB id codes 4N7Z

Gene location (Human)
Chr.	Chromosome 18 (human)
Band	18p11.21	Start	12,991,362 bp
Band	18p11.21	End	13,125,052 bp

Gene location (Mouse)
Chr.	Chromosome 18 (mouse)
Band	18|18 E1- E2	Start	67,933,177 bp
Band	18|18 E1- E2	End	68,018,241 bp
RNA expression pattern
Bgee	Human / Mouse (ortholog); Top expressed in: ventricular zone; gonad; granulocyte; Achilles tendon; testicle; right testis; left testis; secondary oocyte; mucosa of transverse colon; sperm / Top expressed in: genital tubercle; tail of embryo; hand; spermatocyte; secondary oocyte; superior cervical ganglion; epiblast; zygote; ventricular zone; maxillary prominence; More reference expression data
BioGPS	n/a
Gene ontology
Molecular function	phosphatase binding; protein binding
Cellular component	centriole; centrosome; pericentriolar material; cytoskeleton; cytoplasm; cytosol
Biological process	negative regulation of phosphatase activity; G2/M transition of mitotic cell cycle; ciliary basal body-plasma membrane docking; regulation of G2/M transition of mitotic cell cycle; protein localization to centrosome; centrosome-templated microtubule nucleation; mitotic spindle assembly; response to bacterium; centrosome duplication; spindle assembly
Sources:Amigo / QuickGO
Orthologs
Databases	NCBI: entry; OMA: entry
Species	Human	Mouse
Entrez	55125	70799
Ensembl	ENSG00000101639	ENSMUSG00000024542
UniProt	Q8TEP8	n/a
RefSeq (mRNA)	NM_018069; NM_032142	NM_027556
RefSeq (protein)	NP_115518	n/a
Location (UCSC)	Chr 18: 12.99 – 13.13 Mb	Chr 18: 67.93 – 68.02 Mb
PubMed search
- Wikidata
View/Edit Human	View/Edit Mouse

Centrosomal protein of 192 kDa, also known as Cep192, is a protein that in humans is encoded by the CEP192 gene. It is the homolog of the C. elegans and D. melanogaster gene SPD-2.

Cep192 is a major regulator of pericentriolar material recruitment, centrosome maturation, and centriole duplication in mammalian cells. It stimulates the formation of the scaffolding upon which gamma tubulin ring complexes and other proteins involved in microtubule nucleation and spindle assembly become functional during mitosis.
