= Hydroxyproline =

Names
- IUPAC name (2S,4R)-4-Hydroxypyrrolidine-2-carboxylic acid

Identifiers
CAS Number	51-35-4
3D model (JSmol)	Interactive image
ChemSpider	5605
ECHA InfoCard	100.000.084
MeSH	Hydroxyproline
PubChem CID	5810
UNII	RMB44WO89X
CompTox Dashboard (EPA)	DTXSID10883225
- InChI: InChI=1S/C5H9NO3/c7-3-1-4(5(8)9)6-2-3/h3-4,6-7H,1-2H2,(H,8,9)/t3-,4+/m1/s1 Key: PMMYEEVYMWASQN-DMTCNVIQSA-N; InChI=1/C5H9NO3/c7-3-1-4(5(8)9)6-2-3/h3-4,6-7H,1-2H2,(H,8,9)/t3-,4+/m1/s1 Key: PMMYEEVYMWASQN-DMTCNVIQBF
- SMILES: C1[C@H](CN[C@@H]1C(=O)O)O

Properties
Chemical formula	C_{5}H_{9}NO_{3}
Molar mass	131.131 g·mol^{−1}
- Except where otherwise noted, data are given for materials in their standard state (at 25 °C [77 °F], 100 kPa). verify (what is ?) Infobox references

(2S,4R)-4-Hydroxyproline, or L-hydroxyproline (C_{5}H_{9}O_{3}N), is an amino acid, abbreviated as Hyp or O, e.g., in Protein Data Bank.

== Structure and discovery ==
In 1902, Hermann Emil Fischer isolated hydroxyproline from hydrolyzed gelatin. In 1905, Hermann Leuchs synthesized a racemic mixture of 4-hydroxyproline.

Hydroxyproline differs from proline by the presence of a hydroxyl (OH) group attached to the gamma carbon atom.

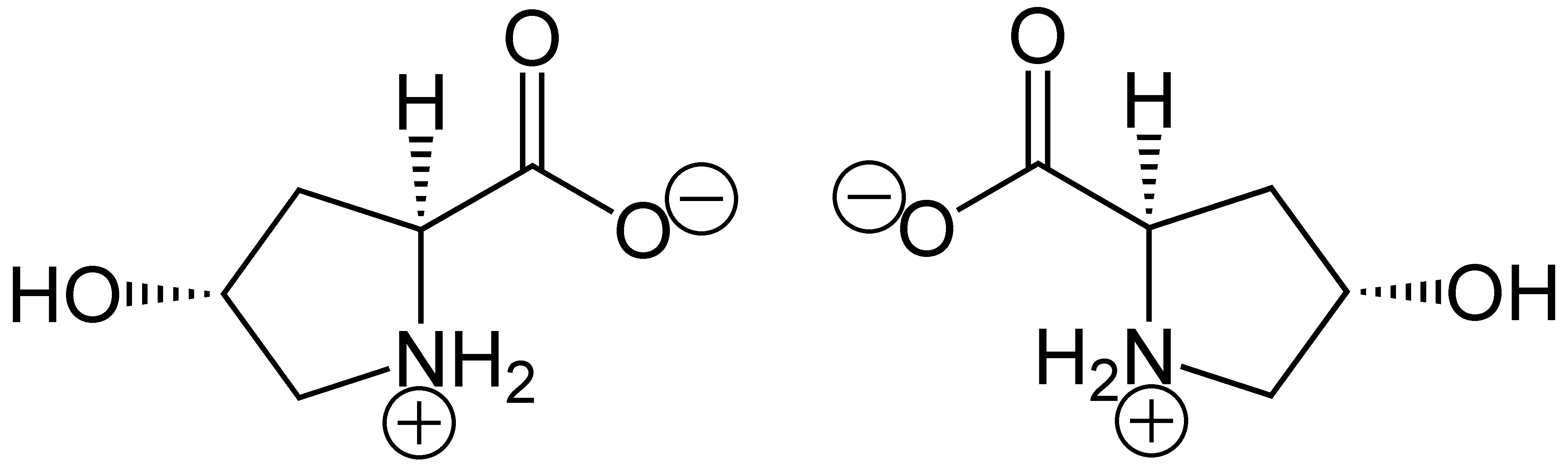
Zwitterionic structure of natural (2S,4R)-4-hydroxyproline (left) and its unnatural mirror image (2R,4S)-4-hydroxyproline (right)

== Production and function ==
Hydroxyproline is produced by hydroxylation of the amino acid proline by the enzyme prolyl 4-hydroxylase following protein synthesis (as a post-translational modification). The enzyme-catalyzed reaction takes place in the lumen of the endoplasmic reticulum. Although it is not directly incorporated into proteins, hydroxyproline comprises roughly 4% of all amino acids found in animal tissue, an amount greater than seven other amino acids that are translationally incorporated.

=== Animals ===
==== Collagen ====
Hydroxyproline is a major component of the protein collagen, comprising roughly 13.5% of mammalian collagen. Hydroxyproline and proline play key roles for collagen stability. They permit the sharp twisting of the collagen helix. In the canonical collagen Xaa-Yaa-Gly triad (where Xaa and Yaa are any amino acid), a proline occupying the Yaa position is hydroxylated to give a Xaa-Hyp-Gly sequence. This modification of the proline residue increases the stability of the collagen triple helix. It was initially proposed that the stabilization was due to water molecules forming a hydrogen bonding network linking the prolyl hydroxyl groups and the main-chain carbonyl groups. It was subsequently shown that the increase in stability is primarily through stereoelectronic effects and that hydration of the hydroxyproline residues provides little or no additional stability.

==== Non-collagen ====
Hydroxyproline is found in few proteins other than collagen. For this reason, hydroxyproline content has been used as an indicator to determine collagen and/or gelatin amount. However, the mammalian proteins elastin and argonaute 2 have collagen-like domains in which hydroxyproline is formed. Some snail poisons, conotoxins, contain hydroxyproline, but lack collagen-like sequences.

Hydroxylation of proline has been shown to be involved in targeting Hypoxia-inducible factor (HIF) alpha subunit (HIF-1 alpha) for degradation by proteolysis. Under normoxia (normal oxygen conditions) EGLN1 protein hydroxylates the proline at the 564 position of HIF-1 alpha, which allows ubiquitylation by the von Hippel-Lindau tumor suppressor (pVHL) and subsequent targeting for proteasome degradation.

DYRK1A, DYRK1B, protein kinase B, eEF2, IKK2, p53, FOXO3A, CEP192 are also reportedly hydroxylated by PHD1. p53 and MAPH6 are also hydroxylated by PHD3.

Free hydroxyproline appears to be an antioxidant, like free proline.

=== Plants ===
Hydroxyproline rich glycoproteins (HRGPs) are also found in plant cell walls. These hydroxyprolines serve as the attachment points for glycan chains which are added as post-translational modifications.

=== Protists ===
Hydroxyproline is also found in the walls of oomycetes, fungus-like protists related to diatoms. Phytophthora cactorum specifically produces a pathogenic protein containg 4-hydroxyproline.

== Catabolism ==
Free 4-hydroxyproline is produced when collagen is broken down. Two possible pathways can be used to break it down: the hydroxyproline dehydrogenase (PRODH2) pathway results in the production of glycine, glyoxylate, glycolate, and oxalate, while the L-amino-acid oxidase pathway results in the production of pyrrole-2-carboxylate. This additional source of glycine is important in young livestock as mammal milk and plant-based feed is deficient in glycine.

== Clinical significance ==
Proline hydroxylation requires ascorbic acid (vitamin C). The most obvious, first effects (gingival and hair problems) of absence of ascorbic acid in humans come from the resulting defect in hydroxylation of proline residues of collagen, with reduced stability of the collagen molecule, causing scurvy.

Increased serum and urine levels of hydroxyproline have also been demonstrated in Paget's disease.

Mass spectrometry analysis showed decreased amount of hydroxyproline post-translational modifications in non inflamed tissue from ulcerative colitis patients when compared to tissue from donors without the disease.

== Other hydroxyprolines ==
=== Isomers ===
Other hydroxyprolines also exist in nature. The most notable one is trans-L-3-hydroxyproline (or (2S,3S)-3-hydroxyproline), produced in humans and other animals by prolyl 3-hydroxylase (EC 1.14.11.7). Although present in much lower amounts than trans-L-4-hydroxyproline, 3-hydroxyproline is indispensable for the functioning of type IV collagen in mice. Without it the embryo does not survive to birth.

Intestinal bacteria produce 4-hydroxyproline epimerase, which performs a bidirectional conversion between the typical (for humans) trans-4-hydroxyproline and cis-4-hydroxy-D-proline. Archaea, trypanosomes, and possibly animals also perform this conversion.

cis-4-Hydroxyproline (equivalently, (2S,4S)-) is found in the toxic cyclic peptides from Amanita mushrooms (e.g., phalloidin).

=== Further modifications ===
Diatom cell walls contain 2,3-cis-, 3,4-trans-, and 3,4-dihydroxyproline, which are postulated to have a role in silica deposition.

== See also ==
- Secondary amino acid
- Imino acid
- Hydroxylysine
