= Pyrrole-2-carboxylic acid =

Names
- Other names 2-Mialine, 2-Minaline, Minalin, Minaline

Identifiers
CAS Number	634-97-9
3D model (JSmol)	Interactive image
Beilstein Reference	80825
ChEBI	CHEBI:36751
ChEMBL	ChEMBL509027
ChemSpider	11963
DrugBank	DB02543
ECHA InfoCard	100.010.202
EC Number	211-221-9
Gmelin Reference	101562
KEGG	C05942
PubChem CID	12473
UNII	2NNB85QQT9
CompTox Dashboard (EPA)	DTXSID50212813
- InChI: InChI=1S/C5H5NO2/c7-5(8)4-2-1-3-6-4/h1-3,6H,(H,7,8) Key: WRHZVMBBRYBTKZ-UHFFFAOYSA-N
- SMILES: C1=CNC(=C1)C(=O)O

Properties
Chemical formula	C_{5}H_{5}NO_{2}
Molar mass	111.100 g·mol^{−1}
Appearance	white solid
Melting point	206 °C (403 °F; 479 K)

Hazards
- GHS labelling
Pictograms	(GHS07: Exclamation mark)
Signal word	Warning
Hazard statements	H315, H319, H335
Precautionary statements	P261, P264, P271, P280, P302+P352, P304+P340, P305+P351+P338, P312, P321, P332+P313, P337+P313, P362, P403+P233, P405, P501
- Except where otherwise noted, data are given for materials in their standard state (at 25 °C [77 °F], 100 kPa). Infobox references

Pyrrole-2-carboxylic acid is an organic compound with the formula HNC_{4}H_{3}CO_{2}H. It is one of two monocarboxylic acids of pyrrole. It is a white solid. It arises in nature by dehydrogenation of the amino acid proline. It also arises by carboxylation of pyrrole. The ethyl ester of this acid is readily prepared from pyrrole.

== Metabolism ==
In bacteria including Arthrobacter and Rhodococcus species, a specific enzyme, pyrrole-2-carboxylate monooxygenase converts pyrrole-2-carboxylic acid to its 5-hydroxypyrrole derivative.

Pyrrole-2-carboxylic acid
+ NADH + H^{+}
O_{2}
H_{2}O
5-Hydroxypyrrole-2-carboxylic acid
+ NAD^{+}

The enzyme uses nicotinamide adenine dinucleotide as a cofactor.
