= Efrapeptin =

Efrapeptin F is a type of efrapeptin.

Efrapeptins are peptides produced by fungi in the genus Tolypocladium that have antifungal, insecticidal, and mitochondrial ATPase inhibitory activities. They are produced via a biosynthetic pathway similar to, but simpler than, the ciclosporin pathway with nonribosomal peptide synthase (NRPS) and/or polyketide synthase (PKS) being the key elements.

The amino acid sequences of efrapeptins are:

Efrapeptin F: Ac-Pip-Aib-Pip-Aib-Aib-Leu-bAla-Gly-Aib-Aib-Pip-Aib-Ala-Leu-Iva-Unk
Efrapeptin G: Ac-Pip-Aib-Pip-Iva-Aib-Leu-bAla-Gly-Aib-Aib-Pip-Aib-Ala-Leu-Iva-Unk

Aib: 2-methylalanine; Iva: 2-ethylalanine; Unk: does not match to a known amino acid
