= Procollagen-proline dioxygenase =

Enzyme

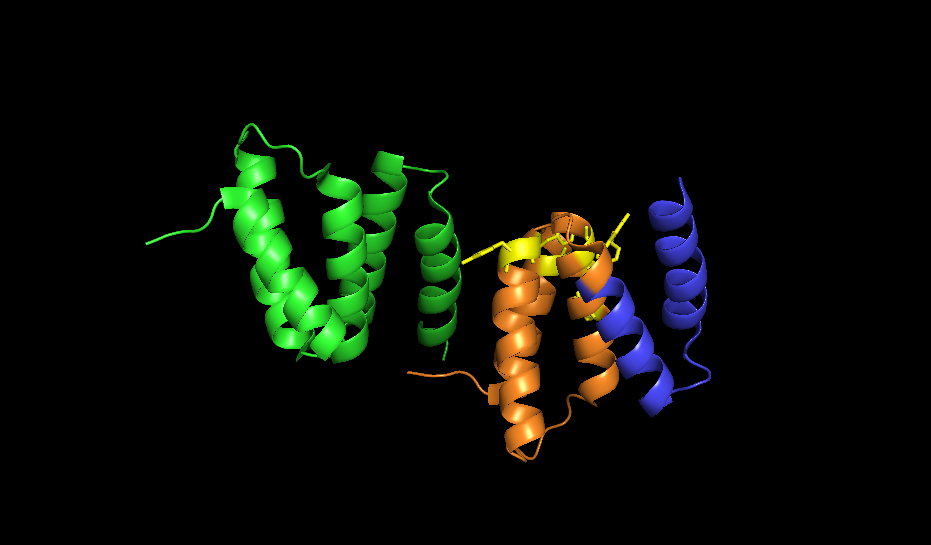
- Alpha subunits of procollagen-proline dioxygenase. Image shows substrate binding region (orange) and the binding groove of tyrosine residues (yellow)

Identifiers
- EC no.: 1.14.11.2
- CAS no.: 9028-06-2

Databases
- IntEnz: IntEnz view
- BRENDA: BRENDA entry
- ExPASy: NiceZyme view
- KEGG: KEGG entry
- MetaCyc: metabolic pathway
- PRIAM: profile
- PDB structures: RCSB PDB PDBe PDBsum
- Gene Ontology: AmiGO / QuickGO
Search
- PMC: articles
- PubMed: articles
- NCBI: proteins

Procollagen-proline dioxygenase, commonly known as prolyl hydroxylase, is a member of the class of enzymes known as alpha-ketoglutarate-dependent hydroxylases. These enzymes catalyze the incorporation of oxygen into organic substrates through a mechanism that requires α-ketoglutaric acid, Fe^{2+}, and ascorbate. This particular enzyme catalyzes the formation of (2S, 4R)-4-hydroxyproline, a compound that represents the most prevalent post-translational modification in the human proteome.

== Enzyme mechanism ==
Procollagen-proline dioxygenase catalyzes the following reaction:

L-proline
Fe(IV)=O
Fe(II)
hydroxyproline

The mechanism for the reaction is similar to that of other dioxygenases, and occurs in two distinct stages: In the first, a highly reactive Fe(IV)=O species is produced. Molecular oxygen is bound end-on in an axial position, producing a dioxygen unit. Nucleophilic attack on C2 generates a tetrahedral intermediate, with loss of the double bond in the dioxygen unit and bonds to iron and the alpha carbon of 2-oxoglutarate. Subsequent elimination of CO_{2} coincides with the formation of the Fe(IV)=O species. The second stage involves the abstraction of the pro-R hydrogen atom from C-4 of the proline substrate followed by radical combination, which yields hydroxyproline.

As a consequence of the reaction mechanism, one molecule of 2-oxoglutarate is decarboxylated, forming succinate. This succinate is hydrolyzed and replaced with another 2-oxoglutarate after each reaction, and it has been concluded that in the presence of 2-oxoglutarate, enzyme-bound Fe^{2+} is rapidly converted to Fe^{3+}, leading to inactivation of the enzyme. Ascorbate is utilized as a cofactor to reduce Fe^{3+} back to Fe^{2+}.

2-oxoglutaric acid
[O]
CO_{2}
succinic acid

== Enzyme structure ==
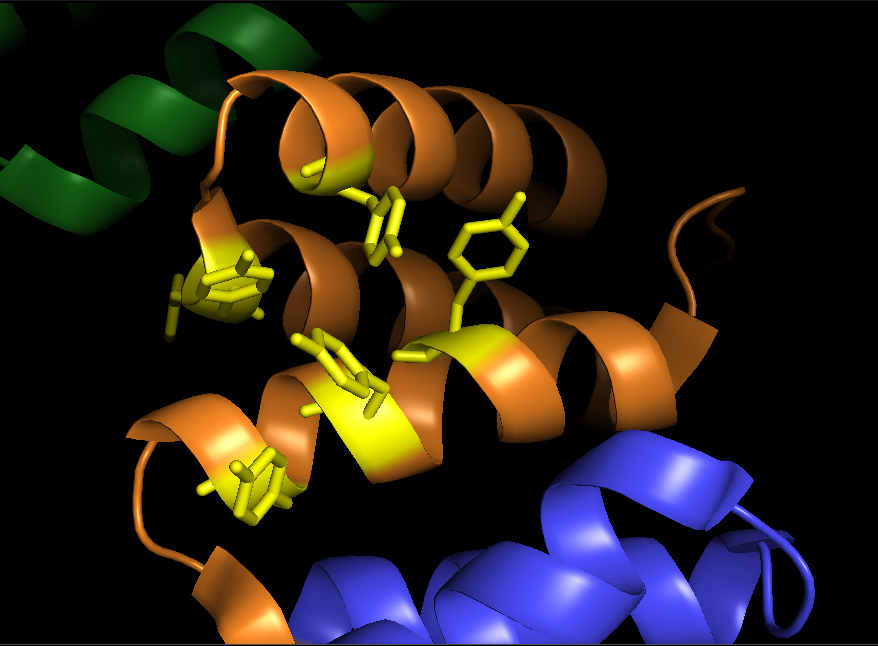
A closer view of the substrate binding domain of prolyl hydroxylase. Tyrosine residues, which form the binding groove, are displayed in yellow.

Prolyl hydroxylase is a tetramer with 2 unique subunits. The α subunit is 59 kDa and is responsible for both peptide binding and for catalytic activity. The peptide binding domain spans residues 140-215 of the α subunit, and consists of a concave surface lined with multiple tyrosine residues which interact favorably with the proline-rich substrate. The active site consists of Fe^{2+} bound to two histidine residues and one aspartate residue, a characteristic shared by most 2-oxoglutarate-dependent dioxygenases. The 55 kDa β subunit is responsible for the enzyme’s localization to and retention in the endoplasmic reticulum. This subunit is identical to the enzyme known as protein disulfide isomerase.

== Biological function ==
Prolyl hydroxylase catalyzes the formation of hydroxyproline. The modification has a significant impact on the stability of collagen, the major connective tissue of the human body. Specifically, hydroxylation increases the melting temperature (T_{m}) of helical collagen by 16 °C, as compared to unhydroxylated collagen, a difference that allows the protein to be stable at body temperature. Due to the abundance of collagen (about one third of total protein) in humans, and the high occurrence of this modification in collagen, hydroxyproline is quantitatively the most abundant post-translational modification in humans.

The enzyme acts specifically on proline contained within the X-Pro-Gly motif – where Pro is proline. Because of this motif-specific behavior, the enzyme also acts on other proteins that contain this same sequence. Such proteins include C1q, elastins, PrP, Argonaute 2, and conotoxins, among others.

== Disease relevance ==
As prolyl hydroxylase requires ascorbate as a cofactor to function, its absence compromises the enzyme’s activity. The resulting decreased hydroxylation leads to the disease condition known as scurvy. Since stability of collagen is compromised in scurvy patients, symptoms include weakening of blood vessels causing purpura, petechiae, and gingival bleeding.

Hypoxia-inducible factor (HIF) is an evolutionarily conserved transcription factor that allows the cell to respond physiologically to decreases in oxygen. A class of prolyl hydroxylases which act specifically on HIF has been identified; hydroxylation of HIF allows the protein to be targeted for degradation. HIF prolyl-hydroxylase has been targeted by a variety of inhibitors that aim to treat stroke, kidney disease, ischemia, anemia, and other important diseases.

== Alternate names ==
- Protocollagen hydroxylase
- Prolyl hydroxylase
- Prolyl 4-hydroxylase
- Protocollagen prolyl hydroxylase
