= Pipecolic acid =

Names
- Preferred IUPAC name Piperidine-2-carboxylic acid

Identifiers
CAS Number	3105-95-1 (2S)
3D model (JSmol)	Interactive image
ChEBI	CHEBI:17964
ChemSpider	826
ECHA InfoCard	100.007.835
EC Number	217-024-4
KEGG	C00408
MeSH	C031345
PubChem CID	849
UNII	69374CKB33
CompTox Dashboard (EPA)	DTXSID40862144
- InChI: InChI=1S/C6H11NO2/c8-6(9)5-3-1-2-4-7-5/h5,7H,1-4H2,(H,8,9) Key: HXEACLLIILLPRG-UHFFFAOYSA-N; InChI=1/C6H11NO2/c8-6(9)5-3-1-2-4-7-5/h5,7H,1-4H2,(H,8,9) Key: HXEACLLIILLPRG-UHFFFAOYAL
- SMILES: C1CCNC(C1)C(=O)O

Properties
Chemical formula	C_{6}H_{11}NO_{2}
Molar mass	129.15704
Appearance	white or colorless solid
Melting point	268 °C (514 °F; 541 K)
- Except where otherwise noted, data are given for materials in their standard state (at 25 °C [77 °F], 100 kPa). verify (what is ?) Infobox references

Pipecolic acid (piperidine-2-carboxylic acid) is an organic compound with the formula HNC_{5}H_{9}CO_{2}H. It is a carboxylic acid derivative of piperidine and, as such, an amino acid, although one not encoded genetically. Like many other α-amino acids, pipecolic acid is chiral, although the S-stereoisomer is more common. It is a colorless solid.

Its biosynthesis starts from lysine. CRYM, a taxon-specific protein that also binds thyroid hormones, is involved in the pipecolic acid pathway.

== Medicine ==
It accumulates in pipecolic acidemia. Elevation of pipecolic acid can be associated with some forms of epilepsy, such as pyridoxine-dependent epilepsy.

== Occurrence and reactions ==
Like most amino acids, pipecolic acid is a chelating agent. One complex is Cu(HNC_{5}H_{9}CO_{2})_{2}(H_{2}O)_{2}.

Pipecolic acid was identified in the Murchison meteorite. It also occurs in the leaves of the genus Myroxylon, a tree from South America.

== See also ==
- Bupivacaine
- Efrapeptin
