= Bruno Reversade =

American geneticist (born 1978)

Bruno REVERSADE
- Born: 1974 (age 51–52)
- Citizenship: French / American
- Education: University of California, Los Angeles
- Children: 4
- Awards: Society-in-Science, Branco Weiss Fellow (2007), A*STAR Investigator (2008), EMBO Young Investigators (2012), National Research Foundation (2019)
- Scientific career
- Fields: Mendelian Genetics, Developmental biology, Micropeptides, Hormones
- Workplaces: A*STAR; Koç University; Vrije Universiteit Amsterdam; National University of Singapore KAUST
- Doctoral advisor: Edward M. De Robertis
- Other academic advisors: Davor Solter
- Website: www.reversade.com

Bruno Reversade (born 1978) is an American human geneticist and developmental biologist . He is a Director of the Institute of Molecular and Cellular Biology and the Genome Institute of Singapore at A*STAR (Singapore) and holds several faculty positions at other universities. Reversade is known for identifying mutated genes that cause Mendelian diseases, for his research on the genetics of identical twins and for the characterizations of novel hormones.

== Early life and education ==
Bruno Reversade was born in 1974 into a French-American family. He was raised in Grenoble (France) and Washington, D.C. (US). Bruno Reversade studied at the University Joseph Fourier, Pierre and Marie Curie University and UCLA.

== Scientific career ==
Reversade became interested in developmental biology in 1997 when studying at the University of Western Ontario (Canada) under the tutelage of Greg Kelly.

He earned his master's degree at the Pasteur Institute (Paris, France), where he studied head development in the mouse embryo. He then moved to the United States to work at the HHMI laboratory of Edward M. De Robertis at the University of California, Los Angeles. There he studied the specification of the dorsal-ventral axis during vertebrate development using Xenopus embryos. In 2005, Reversade and De Robertis detailed how multiple extracellular proteins allow embryos that are cut in two to self-regulate consistently.

In 2006, Reversade earned his PhD from the Pierre and Marie Curie University. In 2008, he received the A*STAR investigatorship (Singapore) award and set up his team in 2008 at the Institute of Medical Biology to carry out human embryology and genetic research. In 2015, he became a Director at A*STAR. Also in 2015, he received AAA Fellowship from the Vrije Universiteit Amsterdam and was appointed Professor of Human Genetics at the Centre for Reproductive Medicine at the university's Academic Medical Center. Since 2016, Reversade is a Distinguished Professor of Human Genetics at Koç University (Turkey). In 2023, Reversade became a bioscience Professor at KAUST in the Kingdom of Saudi Arabia.

== Research areas ==
=== Mendelian genetics ===
Reversade's team works on the genetic characterization and clinical description of inherited conditions in humans.

They have identified mutations responsible for progeroid syndromes in humans, NLRP1 inflammasome-related diseases, self-healing cancers and numerous diseases causing birth defects

Reversade's group has identified the following genes to be responsible for novel Mendelian diseases:

| Year | Gene | Inheritance | Mendelian disease | Phenotype MIM number |
|---|---|---|---|---|
| 2009 | PYCR1 | Recessive | Cutis laxa, autosomal recessive, type IIB (wrinkly skin syndrome) | 614438 |
| 2010 | CHSY1 | Recessive | Temtamy preaxial brachydactyly syndrome | 605282 |
| 2011 | TGFBR1 | Dominant | Multiple Self-healing Squamous Epithelioma (Fergurson-Smith disease) | 132800 |
| 2012 | IRX5 | Recessive | Hamamy syndrome | 611174 |
| 2012 | AAGAB | Recessive | Punctate palmoplantar keratoderma, type IA | 148600 |
| 2014 | KATNB1 | Recessive | Lissencephaly with Microcephaly 6 | 616212 |
| 2015 | DCPS | Recessive | Al-Raqad syndrome | 616459 |
| 2015 | ALDH18A1 | Dominant | Dominant Cutis laxa type 3 | 616603 |
| 2016 | NLRP1 | Dominant | Multiple self-healing palmoplantar carcinoma | 615225 |
| 2016 | NLRP1 | Recessive | familial keratosis lichenoides chronica (FKLC) | 615225 |
| 2016 | USP9X | Heterozygous | X-linked syndromic mental retardation 99 | 300968 |
| 2016 | ELMO2 | Recessive | Primary intraosseous vascular malformation | 606893 |
| 2017 | ENPP1 | Recessive | Cole disease | 615522 |
| 2017 | CDK10 | Recessive | Al Kaissi syndrome | 617694 |
| 2017 | LGI4 | Recessive | Neurogenic Arthrogryposis multiplex congenita with myelin defect | 617468 |
| 2017 | KIAA1109 | Recessive | Alkuraya-Kucinskas syndrome | 617822 |
| 2017 | SMCHD1 | Dominant | Bosma arhinia microphthalmia syndrome | 603457 |
| 2018 | CAMK2A | Recessive | Intellectual disability, autosomal recessive 63 | 618095 |
| 2018 | RSPO2 | Recessive | Tetraamelia syndrome with pulmonary agenesis | 618021 |
| 2019 | TBX4 | Recessive | PAPPA syndrome | 601719 |
| 2019 | NLRP1 | Recessive | Congenital juvenile recurrent respiratory papillomatosis (JRRP) | 618803 |
| 2020 | UGDH | Recessive | Jamuar Syndrome | 603370 |
| 2020 | MTX2 | Recessive | Mandibuloacral dysplasia progeroid syndrome | 619127 |
| 2020 | NUAK2 | Recessive | Anencephaly 2 | 619452 |
| 2021 | C2orf69 | Recessive | Elbracht-Işikay Syndrome | 619423 |
| 2021 | WLS | Recessive | Zaki Syndrome | 619648 |
| 2021 | CIROP | Recessive | Visceral heterotaxy-12 (HTX12) | 619702 |
| 2022 | DPP9 | Recessive | Hatipoğlu syndrome | 608258 |
| 2022 | FOCAD | Recessive | Severe Liver congenital disease | 619991 |
| 2022 | TMEM147 | Recessive | Neurodevelopmental disorder with facial dysmorphism & absent language | 620075 |
| 2023 | TAPT1 | Recessive | Lethal Osteochondrodysplasia | 616897 |
| 2023 | DRG1 | Recessive | Neurodevelopmental disorder | 603952 |
| 2023 | RAF1 | Recessive | Progeroid disease | 164760 |

=== Developmental biology and Twinning ===
Reversade's investigations in developmental biology have relied on various animal model organisms (C. elegans, Drosophila, zebrafish, Xenopus and transgenic mice) and covered such embryonic processes as neural induction, limb development, and various human diseases causing birth defects.

In 2005, during his Ph.D. thesis in the laboratory of Edward De Robertis, the scientists published two discoveries, pertaining to the self-regulation of an embryonic morphogenetic field mediated by the extracellular Chordin/BMP/Sizzled pathway. This helped provide a molecular framework for how embryos split in two halves can develop into perfect, albeit smaller, identical twinned embryos.

Reversade also researches the genetics of dizygotic and monozygotic twinning in humans. He has been searching for genes responsible for monozygotic (MZ) twinning from rare population isolates.

In 2021, together with the VU Amsterdam, his group revealed that MZ twins harbor an epigenetic signature in their somatic tissue even decades after their birth. This stable DNA mark could be employed to retrospectively assess if a person is a MZ twin even if his/her co-twin vanished in utero.

=== Hormones and Micropeptides ===
Reversade's research has also pioneered the annotation of novel micropeptides.

- ELABELA In 2013, he discovered and patented a novel hormone named Elabela (ELA). This secreted circulating peptide works as an endogenous ligand for the Apelin receptor (a G protein-coupled receptor). The genetic inactivation of ELA leads to cardiovascular defects, predisposes to preeclampsia and is needed for the self-renewal of human embryonic stem cells. Analogues of Elabela have entered clinical trials by Amgen.
- BRAWNIN In 2020, he participated in the characterization of C12orf73, a protein-coding gene responsible for the making of a 71 amino-acid peptide called BRAWNIN. This small peptide is essential for respiratory chain complex III (CIII) assembly in human cells and zebrafish.
- C2orf69 In 2021, together with I. Kurth and colleagues, his team identified a fatal syndrome caused by the homozygous inactivation of C2orf69. This gene codes for a 385 amino-acid peptide which can be secreted or associated with mitochondria. C2ORF69 possesses homology to esterase/lipase enzymes.

== Awards and recognition ==
- Society-in-Science Branco Weiss Fellowship (2007), ETH Zurich;
- Inaugural A*STAR Investigatorship award (2008), Agency for Science, Technology and Research;
- EMBO Young Investigator award (2012), European Molecular Biology Organization;
- AAA Fellow (2015), Vrije Universiteit Amsterdam;
- Senior NRF Investigator (2018), National Research Foundation, Government of Singapore.
