= Micropeptide =

Short length polypeptides

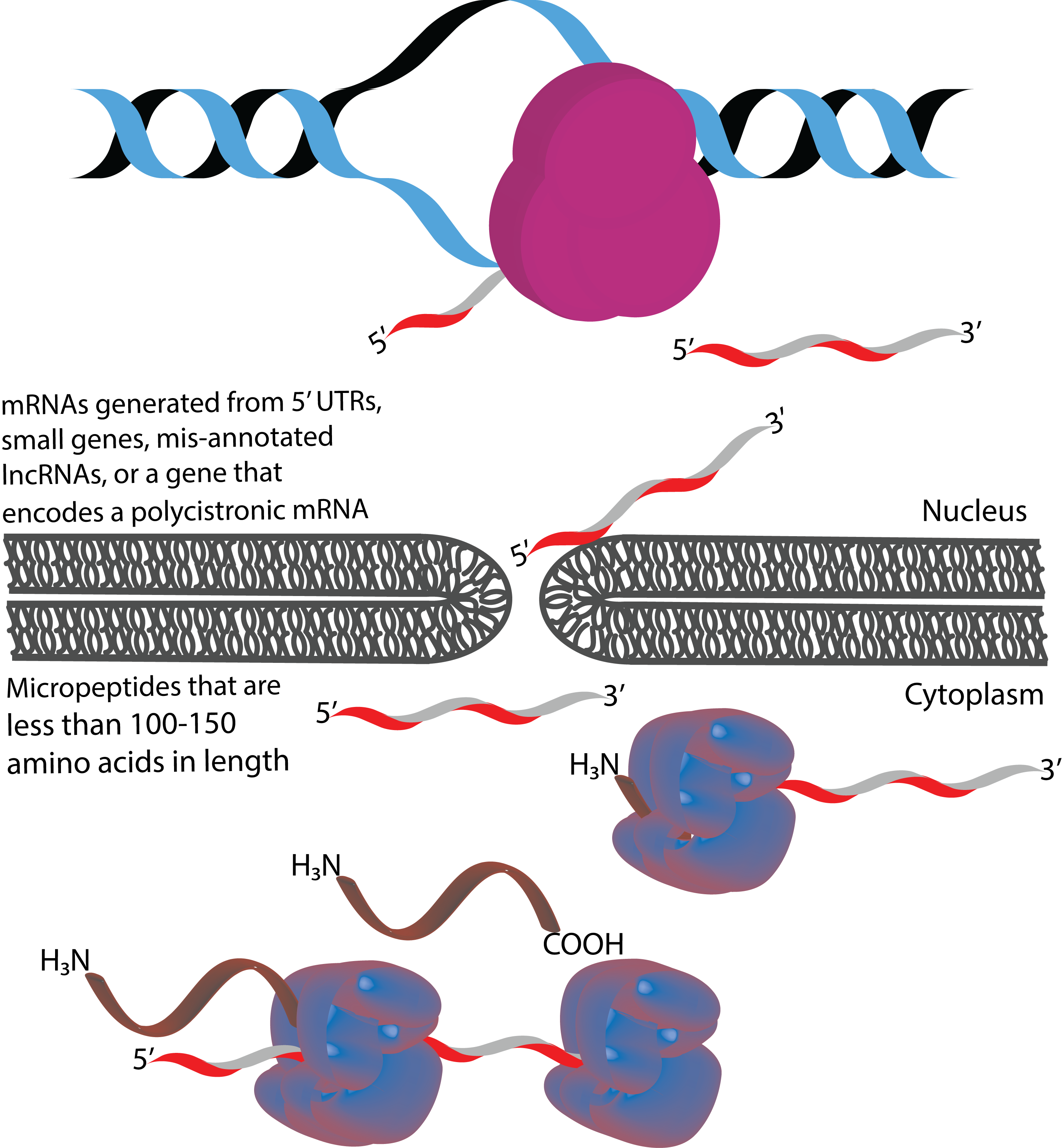
Micropeptides can be transcribed from 5'UTRs, small genes, polycistronic mRNAs, or mis-annotated lncRNA.

Micropeptides (also referred to as microproteins and small proteins) are polypeptides with a length of less than 100-150 amino acids that are encoded by short open reading frames (sORFs). In this respect, they differ from many other active small polypeptides, which are produced through the posttranslational cleavage of larger polypeptides. In terms of size, micropeptides are considerably shorter than "canonical" proteins, which have an average length of 330 and 449 amino acids in prokaryotes and eukaryotes, respectively. Micropeptides are sometimes named according to their genomic location. For example, the translated product of an upstream open reading frame (uORF) might be called a uORF-encoded peptide (uPEP). Micropeptides lack an N-terminal signaling sequences, suggesting that they are likely to be localized to the cytoplasm. However, some micropeptides have been found in other cell compartments, as indicated by the existence of transmembrane micropeptides. They are found in both prokaryotes and eukaryotes. The sORFs from which micropeptides are translated can be encoded in 5' UTRs, small genes, or polycistronic mRNAs. Some micropeptide-coding genes were originally mis-annotated as long non-coding RNAs (lncRNAs).

Given their small size, sORFs were originally overlooked. However, hundreds of thousands of putative micropeptides have been identified through various techniques in a multitude of organisms. Only a small fraction of these with coding potential have had their expression and function confirmed. Those that have been functionally characterized, in general, have roles in cell signaling, organogenesis, and cellular physiology. As more micropeptides are discovered so are more of their functions. One regulatory function is that of peptoswitches, which inhibit expression of downstream coding sequences by stalling ribosomes, through their direct or indirect activation by small molecules.

Also known as sORF-encoded protein (SEP), they have a single protein domain. They are related to multidomain proteins. Microproteins regulate larger multidomain proteins at the post-translational level. Microproteins are analogous to MicroRNAs (miRNAs) and heterodimerize with their targets causing dominant and negative effects. In animals and plants, microproteins influence many biological processes. Because of their dominant effects on their targets, microproteins are currently under study for use in biotechnology. There are several methods for microprotein study, such as ribosome profiling, mass spectrometry, and genetic screening. In humans, "microproteins that have indeterminate potential as functional proteins" are called peptideins.

== Identification ==
The size of small proteins has limited their identification and characterization for a long time. However, the various examples of functionality have led to the development of methods for their identification. Various experimental techniques exist for identifying potential sORFs and their translational products. These techniques are only useful for identification of sORF that may produce micropeptides and not for direct functional characterization.

For larger ORFs, computational identification is based solely on their long uninterrupted coding potential. Computational searches for small proteins take into account multiple parameters, such as the presence of a ribosome binding site and amino acid conservation. RNA sequencing or mass spectrometric data sets available are also incorporated into computational predictions.

A method extensively used for the identification of small proteins is ribosome profiling (Ribo-seq or ribosome footprinting). Ribosome profiling uses next generation sequencing and targets only mRNA sequences protected by the ribosomes. Binding of a ribosome on an mRNA suggests that the transcript is being actively translated, allowing for the identification even of very small ORFs.

Mass spectrometry is the best method thus far for identifying small proteins, but their sizes again pose a barrier. However, several adjustments are possible to perform to improve detection and data quality.

=== RNA sequencing ===
One method for finding potential sORFs, and therefore micropeptides, is through RNA sequencing (RNA-Seq). RNA-Seq uses next-generation sequencing (NGS) to determine which RNAs are expressed in a given cell, tissue, or organism at a specific point in time. This collection of data, known as a transcriptome, can then be used as a resource for finding potential sORFs. Because of the strong likelihood of sORFs less than 100 aa occurring by chance, further study is necessary to determine the validity of data obtained using this method.

=== Ribosome profiling (Ribo-Seq) ===
Ribosome profiling has been used to identify potential micropeptides in a growing number of organisms, including fruit flies, zebrafish, mice and humans. One method uses compounds such as harringtonine, puromycin or lactimidomycin to stop ribosomes at translation initiation sites. This indicates where active translation is taking place. Translation elongation inhibitors, such as emetine or cycloheximide, may also be used to obtain ribosome footprints which are more likely to result in a translated ORF. If a ribosome is bound at or near a sORF, it putatively encodes a micropeptide.

=== Mass spectrometry ===
Mass spectrometry (MS) is the gold standard for identifying and sequencing proteins. Using this technique, investigators are able to determine if polypeptides are, in fact, translated from a sORF.

=== Proteogenomic applications ===
Proteogenomics combines proteomics, genomics, and transciptomics. This is important when looking for potential micropeptides. One method of using proteogenomics entails using RNA-Seq data to create a custom database of all possible polypeptides. Liquid chromatography followed by tandem MS (LC-MS/MS) is performed to provide sequence information for translation products. Comparison of the transcriptomic and proteomics data can be used to confirm the presence of micropeptides.

=== Phylogenetic conservation ===
Phylogenetic conservation can be a useful tool, particularly when sifting through a large database of sORFs. The likelihood of a sORF resulting in a functional micropeptide is more likely if it is conserved across numerous species. However, this will not work for all sORFs. For example, those that are encoded by lncRNAs are less likely to be conserved given lncRNAs themselves do not have high sequence conservation. Further experimentation will be necessary to determine if a functional micropeptide is in fact produced.

== Validating protein-coding potential ==
=== Antibodies ===
Custom antibodies targeted to the micropeptide of interest can be useful for quantifying expression or determining intracellular localization. As is the case with most proteins, low expression may make detection difficult. The small size of the micropeptide can also lead to difficulties in designing an epitope from which to target the antibody.

=== Tagging with CRISPR-Cas9 ===
Genome editing can be used to add FLAG/MYC or other small peptide tags to an endogenous sORF, thus creating fusion proteins. In most cases, this method is beneficial in that it can be performed more quickly than developing a custom antibody. It is also useful for micropeptides for which no epitope can be targeted.

=== In vitro translation ===
This process entails cloning the full-length micropeptide cDNA into a plasmid containing a T7 or SP6 promoter. This method utilizes a cell-free protein-synthesizing system in the presence of ^{35}S-methionine to produce the peptide of interest. The products can then be analyzed by gel electrophoresis and the ^{35}S-labeled peptide is visualized using autoradiography.

== Structure ==
Microproteins are a diverse fold class of proteins. Microproteins generally feature a single protein domain. The active form is translated from smORF. smORFs can be less than 100 codons. However, not all microproteins are small, and the name was given because of the analogy to miRNAs.

Their tertiary structure is usually maintained by disulphide bridges, metal ligands, and/or cofactors such as heme. Despite their short length, microproteins have been shown to a limited but diverse set of structural folds (including predominantly α-helical and transmembrane-helical structures), but many candidates also show substantial intrinsic disorder; experimentally determined microprotein structures have been solved using approaches including X-ray crystallography, cryo-electron microscopy, and NMR. A computational survey of predicted structures for 44 microproteins reported broadly similar structural characteristics across the set and comparatively few predicted small-molecule ligand-binding sites. Because many structure/disorder predictors are trained primarily on longer "classical" proteins, dedicated workflows and precautions have been proposed for reliable structure and disorder prediction for microproteins.

== Function ==
Microproteins function as post-translational regulators. Microproteins disrupt the formation of heterodimeric, homodimeric, or multimeric complexes. Furthermore, microproteins can interact with any protein that requires functional dimers to function normally. The primary targets are transcription factors that bind to DNA as dimers. Microproteins regulate these complexes by creating homotypic dimers with the targets and inhibit protein complex function. The two types of miP inhibitions are: homotypic miP inhibition and heterotypic miP inhibition. In homotypic miP inhibition, microproteins interact with proteins with similar protein-protein interaction (PPI) domain. In heterotypic miP inhibition, microproteins interact with proteins with different but compatible PPI domain. In both types of inhibition, microproteins interfere and prevent the PPI domains from interacting with their normal proteins. Microproteins plays roles in biological process such as immunity and inflammation, cancer and cell cycle regulation, cellular transport, muscle and heart functions, gene expression and genome maintenance, proteostasis, and metabolic homeostasis.

== Databases and repositories ==
There are several repositories and databases that have been created for both sORFs and micropeptides. A repository for of small ORFs discovered by ribosome profiling can be found at sORFs.org. A repository of putative sORF-encoded peptides in Arabidopsis thaliana can be found at ARA-PEPs. A database of small proteins, especially encoded by non-coding RNAs can be found at SmProt.

== Prokaryotic examples ==
To date, most micropeptides have been identified in prokaryotic organisms. While most have yet to be fully characterized, of those that have been studied, many appear to be critical to the survival of these organisms. Because of their small size, prokaryotes are particularly susceptible to changes in their environment, and as such have developed methods to ensure their existence.

=== Escherichia coli (E. coli) ===
Micropeptides expressed in E. coli exemplify bacterial environmental adaptations. Most of these have been classified into three groups: leader peptides, ribosomal proteins, and toxic proteins. Leader proteins regulate transcription and/or translation of proteins involved in amino acid metabolism when amino acids are scarce. Ribosomal proteins include L36 (rpmJ) and L34 (rpmH), two components of the 50S ribosomal subunit. Toxic proteins, such as ldrD, are toxic at high levels and can kill cells or inhibit growth, which functions to reduce the host cell's viability.

=== Salmonella enterica ===
In S. enterica, the MgtC virulence factor is involved in adaptation to low magnesium environments. The hydrophobic peptide MgrR, binds to MgtC, causing its degradation by the FtsH protease.

=== Bacillus subtilis ===
The 46 aa Sda micropeptide, expressed by B. subtilis, represses sporulation when replication initiation is impaired. By inhibiting the histidine Kinase KinA, Sda prevents the activation of the transcription factor Spo0A, which is required for sporulation.

=== Staphylococcus aureus ===
In S. aureus, there are a group of micropeptides, 20-22 aa, that are excreted during host infection to disrupt neutrophil membranes, causing cell lysis. These micropeptides allow the bacterium to avoid degradation by the human immune systems' main defenses.

== Eukaryotic examples ==
Micropeptides have been discovered in eukaryotic organisms from Arabidopsis thaliana to humans. They play diverse roles in tissue and organ development, as well as maintenance and function once fully developed. While many are yet to be functionally characterized, and likely more remain to be discovered, below is a summary of recently identified eukaryotic micropeptide functions.

=== Arabidopsis thaliana ===
The POLARIS (PLS) gene encodes a 36 aa micropeptide. It is necessary for proper vascular leaf patterning and cell expansion in the root. This micropeptide interacts with developmental PIN proteins to form a critical network for hormonal crosstalk between auxin, ethylene, and cytokinin.

ROTUNDIFOLIA (ROT4) in A. thaliana encodes a 53 aa peptide, which localizes to the plasma membrane of leaf cells. The mechanism of ROT4 function is not well understood, but mutants have short rounded leaves, indicating that this peptide may be important in leaf morphogenesis.

=== Zea mays (maize) ===
Brick1 (Brk1) encodes a 76 aa micropeptide, which is highly conserved in both plants and animals. In Z. mays, it was found to be involved in morphogenesis of leaf epithelia, by promoting multiple actin-dependent cell polarization events in the developing leaf epidermis. Zm401p10 is an 89 aa micropeptide, which plays a role in normal pollen development in the tapetum. After mitosis it also is essential in the degradation of the tapetum. Zm908p11 is a micropeptide 97 aa in length, encoded by the Zm908 gene that is expressed in mature pollen grains. It localizes to the cytoplasm of pollen tubes, where it aids in their growth and development.

=== Drosophila melanogaster (fruit fly) ===
The evolutionarily conserved polished rice (pri) gene, known as tarsal-less (tal) in D. melanogaster, is involved in epidermal differentiation. This polycistronic transcript encodes four similar peptides, which range between 11 and 32 aa in length. They function to truncate the transcription factor Shavenbaby (Svb). This converts Svb into an activator that directly regulates the expression of target effectors, including miniature (m) and shavenoid (sha), which are together responsible for trichome formation.

=== Danio rerio (zebrafish) ===
The Elabela gene (Ela) (a.k.a. Apela, Toddler) is important for embryogenesis. It is specifically expressed during late blastula and gastrula stages. During gastrulation, it is critical in promoting the internalization and animal-pole directed movement of mesendodermal cells. After gastrulation, Ela is expressed in the lateral mesoderm, endoderm, as well as the anterior, and posterior, notochord. Although it was annotated as a lncRNA in zebrafish, mouse, and human, the 58-aa ORF was found to be highly conserved among vertebrate species. Ela is processed by removal of its N-terminus signal peptide and then secreted in the extracellular space. Its 34-aa mature peptide serves as the first endogenous ligand to a GPCR known as the Apelin Receptor. The genetic inactivation of Ela or Aplnr in zebrafish results in heartless phenotypes.

=== Mus musculus (mouse) ===
Myoregulin (Mln) is encoded by a gene originally annotated as a lncRNA. Mln is expressed in all 3 types of skeletal muscle, and works similarly to the micropeptides phospholamban (Pln) in the cardiac muscle and sarcolipin (Sln) in slow (Type I) skeletal muscle. These micropeptides interact with sarcoplasmic reticulum Ca^{2+}-ATPase (SERCA), a membrane pump responsible for regulating Ca^{2+} uptake into the sarcoplasmic reticulum (SR). By inhibiting Ca^{2+} uptake into the SR, they cause muscle relaxation. Similarly, the endoregulin (ELN) and another-regulin (ALN) genes code for transmembrane micropeptides that contain the SERCA binding motif, and are conserved in mammals.

Myomixer (Mymx) is encoded by the gene Gm7325, a muscle-specific peptide, 84 aa in length, which plays a role during embryogenesis in fusion and skeletal muscle formation. It localizes to the plasma membrane, associating with a fusogenic membrane protein, Myomaker (Mymk). In humans, the gene encoding Mymx is annotated as uncharacterized LOC101929726. Orthologs are found in the turtle, frog and fish genomes as well.

=== Homo sapiens (human) ===
In humans, NoBody (non-annotated P-body dissociating polypeptide), a 68 aa micropeptide, was discovered in the long intervening noncoding RNA (lincRNA) LINC01420. It has high sequence conservation among mammals, and localizes to P-bodies. It enriches proteins associated with 5' mRNA decapping. It is thought to interact directly with Enhancer of mRNA Decapping 4 (EDC4).

ELABELA (ELA) (a.k.a. APELA) is an endogenous hormone that is secreted as a 32 amino acid micropeptide by human embryonic stem cells. It is essential to maintain the self-renewal and pluripotency of human embryonic stem cells. Its signals in an autocrine fashion through the PI3/AKT pathway via an as yet unidentified cell surface receptor. In differentiating mesoendermal cells ELA binds to, and signals via, APLNR, a GPCR which can also respond to the hormonal peptide APLN.

The CYREN gene, conserved in mammals, when alternatively spliced is predicted to produce three micropeptides. MRI-1 was previously found to be a modulator of retrovirus infection. The second predicted micropeptide, MRI-2, may be important in non-homologous end joining (NHEJ) of DNA double strand breaks. In Co-Immunoprecipitation experiments, MRI-2 bound to Ku70 and Ku80, two subunits of Ku, which play a major role in the NHEJ pathway.

The 24 amino acid micropeptide, Humanin (HN), interacts with the apoptosis-inducing protein Bcl2-associated X protein (Bax). In its active state, Bax undergoes a conformational change which exposes membrane-targeting domains. This causes it to move from the cytosol to the mitochondrial membrane, where it inserts and releases apoptogenic proteins such as cytochrome c. By interacting with Bax, HN prevents Bax targeting of the mitochondria, thereby blocking apoptosis.

A micropeptide of 90aa, 'Small Regulatory Polypeptide of Amino Acid Response' or SPAAR, was found to be encoded in the lncRNA LINC00961. It is conserved between human and mouse, and localizes to the late endosome/lysosome. SPAAR interacts with four subunits of the v-ATPase complex, inhibiting mTORC1 translocation to the lysosomal surface where it is activated. Down-regulation of this micropeptide enables mTORC1 activation by amino acid stimulation, promoting muscle regeneration.

In 2026, the TransCODE Consortium announced the first complete identification of human microproteins and published it in the journal Nature, from research led by Sebastiaan van Heesch of the Princess Máxima Center for Pediatric Oncology, Utrecht, The Netherlands, and co-led by John Prensner (University of Michigan Medical School) and Robert Moritz (Institute for Systems Biology). The scientists gave the name "peptidein" for the protein-like molecules. By definition, they are too small to be named proteins, as they explained:

We develop an annotation framework for ncORF-encoded microproteins as human proteins and codify the new conceptual model of 'peptideins' as microproteins that have indeterminate potential as functional proteins... To bring formal reference gene annotation status to less-well-characterized microproteins, we introduce 'peptidein' as a classification scheme, recognized by our consortia, to exist alongside conventional proteins. To illustrate that further characterization of a peptidein may elevate its classification, we use functional genomics and evolutionary constraint to pinpoint examples that exhibit a signature consistent with a protein-coding gene.

The TransCODE Consortium identified 1,785 peptideins. The human genome contain about 19,500 functional proteins, thus peptideins adds 10% more of functional genes. The number is still preliminary, as Moritz explained that there may be thousand more peptideins to be identified and could double the human proteome.

== History ==
The first miP was discovered during a research in the early 1990s on genes for basic helix–loop–helix (bHLH) transcription factors from a murine erythroleukaemia cell cDNA library. The protein was an inhibitor of DNA binding (ID protein), and negatively regulated the transcription factor complex. The protein was 16 kDa and consisted of a helix-loop-helix (HLH) domain. The microprotein formed bHLH/HLH heterodimers that disrupted the functional basic helix–loop–helix (bHLH) homodimers.

The first plant microprotein discovered was the LITTLE ZIPPER (ZPR) protein. The LITTLE ZIPPER protein contains a leucine zipper domain, but lacks the domains required for DNA binding and transcription activation. Thus, LITTLE ZIPPER protein is analogous to the ID protein. Although not all proteins are small, in 2011, this class of protein was given the name microproteins because their negative regulatory actions are similar to those of miRNAs.

The ID protein or proteins similar to ID are found in all animals. Plant microproteins are only found in higher orders. However, the homeodomain transcription factors that belong to the three-amino-acid loop-extension (TALE) family are targets of microproteins, and these homeodomain proteins are conserved in animals, plants, and fungi.

In 2022, Sonia Chothani at the Duke-NUS Medical School and Genome Institute of Singapore and Jorge Ruiz-Orera at the Max Delbrück Center for Molecular Medicine in the Helmholtz Association (MDC), Berlin, Germany, initiated an international project called TransCODE Consortium. The project aimed at identifying all the proteins produced (encoded) from a small open reading frame (sORF or smORF) in the human genome. Hundreds to thousands of sORFs were estimated to exist in different organisms, and were named as such by Munira A. Basrai, Philip Hieter and Jef D. Boeke of the Johns Hopkins University School of Medicine, in 1997. Some sORF are so small, usually shorter than 100 codons, that they were believed to have no protein-coding genes to make functional peptides. However, were different some genetic diseases and cancers in humans were found to be associated with these short DNA sequences. Association with diseases indicated that they must produce some kind of proteins, hundreds of them, but impossible to detect them directly. For their elusive nature, they were known as the "dark proteome" or "dark proteins".
