= Apelin =

Mammalian protein found in Homo sapiens

APLN

Identifiers
- Aliases: APLN, APEL, XNPEP2, apelin
- External IDs: OMIM: 300297; MGI: 1353624; GeneCards: APLN

Gene location (Human)
Chr.	X chromosome (human)
Band	Xq26.1	Start	129,645,259 bp
Band	Xq26.1	End	129,654,956 bp

Gene location (Mouse)
Chr.	X chromosome (mouse)
Band	X|X A4	Start	47,114,023 bp
Band	X|X A4	End	47,123,730 bp
RNA expression pattern
Bgee	Human / Mouse (ortholog); Top expressed in: C1 segment; substantia nigra; subthalamic nucleus; testicle; hypothalamus; lateral nuclear group of thalamus; amygdala; inferior ganglion of vagus nerve; external globus pallidus; ventral tegmental area / Top expressed in: lumbar subsegment of spinal cord; Ileal epithelium; pericardium; stroma of bone marrow; epiblast; right ventricle; right lung; left lung; entorhinal cortex; digastric muscle; More reference expression data
BioGPS	n/a
Gene ontology
Molecular function	signaling receptor binding; G protein-coupled receptor binding; hormone activity; apelin receptor binding; protein homodimerization activity
Cellular component	perinuclear region of cytoplasm; extracellular space; extracellular region
Biological process	positive regulation of corticotropin-releasing hormone secretion; negative regulation of vasoconstriction; regulation of the force of heart contraction; regulation of respiratory gaseous exchange; positive regulation of corticotropin secretion; regulation of body fluid levels; immune response; feeding behavior; positive regulation of cell population proliferation; positive regulation of heat generation; lactation; positive regulation of phosphorylation; signal transduction; signaling; apelin receptor signaling pathway; positive regulation of G protein-coupled receptor internalization; regulation of signaling receptor activity; G protein-coupled receptor signaling pathway; drinking behavior; negative regulation of blood pressure; positive regulation of heart contraction; coronary vasculature development; negative regulation of gene expression; negative regulation of fibroblast growth factor receptor signaling pathway; positive regulation of pri-miRNA transcription by RNA polymerase II; negative regulation of vascular associated smooth muscle cell proliferation; positive regulation of vascular endothelial cell proliferation; angiogenesis; multicellular organism development; gastrulation
Sources:Amigo / QuickGO
Orthologs
Databases	NCBI: entry; OMA: entry
Species	Human	Mouse
Entrez	8862	30878
Ensembl	ENSG00000171388	ENSMUSG00000037010
UniProt	Q9ULZ1	Q9R0R4
RefSeq (mRNA)	NM_017413	NM_013912
RefSeq (protein)	NP_059109	NP_038940
Location (UCSC)	Chr X: 129.65 – 129.65 Mb	Chr X: 47.11 – 47.12 Mb
PubMed search
- Wikidata
View/Edit Human	View/Edit Mouse

Apelin (also known as APLN) is a peptide that in humans is encoded by the APLN gene. Apelin is one of two endogenous ligands for the G-protein-coupled APJ receptor that is expressed at the surface of some cell types. It is widely expressed in various organs such as the heart, lung, kidney, liver, adipose tissue, gastrointestinal tract, brain, adrenal glands, endothelium, and human plasma.

== Discovery ==
Apelin is a peptide hormone that was identified in 1998 by Masahiko Fujino and his colleagues at Gunma University and Takeda Pharmaceutical Company. In 2013, a second peptide hormone named Elabela was found by Bruno Reversade to also act as an endogenous ligand to the APLNR.

== Biosynthesis ==
The apelin gene encodes a pre-proprotein of 77 amino acids, with a signal peptide in the N-terminal region. After translocation into the endoplasmic reticulum and cleavage of the signal peptide, the proprotein of 55 amino acids may generate several active fragments: a 36 amino acid peptide corresponding to the sequence 42-77 (apelin 36), a 17 amino acid peptide corresponding to the sequence 61-77 (apelin 17) and a 13 amino acid peptide corresponding to the sequence 65-77 (apelin 13). This latter fragment may also undergo a pyroglutamylation at the level of its N-terminal glutamine residue. However the presence and/or the concentrations of those peptides in human plasma has been questioned. Recently, 46 different apelin peptides ranging from apelin 55 (proapelin) to apelin 12 have been identified in bovine colostrum, including C-ter truncated isoforms.

== Physiological functions ==
The sites of receptor expression are linked to the different functions played by apelin in the organism.

=== Vascular ===
Vascular expression of the receptor participates in the control of blood pressure and its activation promotes the formation of new blood vessels (angiogenesis). The blood pressure-lowering (hypotensive) effect of apelin results from the activation of receptors expressed at the surface of endothelial cells. This activation induces the release of nitric oxide (NO), a potent vasodilator, which induces relaxation of the smooth muscle cells of artery wall. Studies performed on mice knocked out for the apelin receptor gene have suggested the existence of a balance between angiotensin II signalling (which increases blood pressure) and apelin signalling (which lowers it). The angiogenic activity is the consequence of apelin action on the proliferation and migration of the endothelial cells. Apelin activates signal transduction cascades inside the cell, including extracellular signal-regulated kinases (ERKs), protein kinase B (PKB, also known as Akt), and p70 s6 kinase phosphorylation, which lead to the proliferation of endothelial cells and the formation of new blood vessels. Genetic knockout of the apelin gene is associated with a delay in the development of the retinal vasculature.

=== Cardiac ===
The apelin receptor is expressed early during the embryonic development of the heart, where it regulates the migration of cell progenitors fated to differentiate into cardiomyocytes, the contractile cells of the heart. Its expression is also detected in the cardiomyocytes of the adult where apelin behaves as one of the most potent stimulator of cardiac contractility. Aged apelin knockout mice develop progressive impairment of cardiac contractility. Apelin acts as a mediator of the cardiovascular control, including for blood pressure and blood flow. It is one of the most potent stimulators of cardiac contractility yet identified, and plays a role in cardiac tissue remodeling. Apelin levels are increased in left ventricles of patients with chronic heart failure and also in patients with chronic liver disease.

=== Exercise ===
The plasma concentration of apelin is shown to increase during exercise. Paradoxically, exogenous apelin in healthy volunteers reduced VO2 peak (peak oxygen consumption) in an endurance test.

=== Brain ===
The apelin receptor is also expressed in the neurons of brain areas involved in regulating water and food intake. Apelin injection increases water intake and apelin decreases the hypothalamic secretion of the antidiuretic hormone vasopressin. This diuretic effect of apelin in association with its hypotensive effect participates in the homeostatic regulation of body fluid. Apelin is also detected in brain areas which control appetite, but its effects on food intake are very contradictory.

=== Adipose tissue ===
Apelin is expressed and secreted by adipocytes, and its production is increased during adipocyte differentiation and is stimulated by insulin. Most obese people have elevated levels of insulin, which may therefore be the reason why obese people have been reported to also have elevated levels of apelin.

=== Digestive ===
The apelin receptor is expressed in several cell types of the gastro-intestinal tract : stomach enterochromaffine-like cells; unknown cells of endocrine pancreas, colon epithelial cells. In stomach, activation of receptors on enterochromaffine-like cells by apelin secreted by parietal cells can inhibit histamine release by enterochromaffine-like cells, which in turn decreases acid secretion by parietal cells. In pancreas, apelin inhibits the insulin secretion induced by glucose. This inhibition reveals the functional interdependency between apelin signalling and insulin signalling observed at the adipocyte level where insulin stimulate apelin production. Recently, receptor expression was also detected in skeletic muscle cells. Its activation is involved in glucose uptake and participates in the control of glucose blood levels glycemia.

=== Bone ===
Receptor expression is also observed at the surface of osteoblasts, the cell progenitors involved in bone formation.

=== Muscle aging ===
Muscle apelin expression decreases with age in rodents and humans. By supplementing aged mice with exogenous apelin, Cedric Dray, Philippe Valet, and their colleagues demonstrated that the peptide was able to promote muscle hypertrophy and consequently induced a gain in strength. This study also demonstrated that apelin targets muscle cells during aging by different and complementary pathways: it acts on muscle metabolism by activating an AMPK-dependent mitochondria biogenesis, it promotes autophagy and decreases inflammation in aged mice. Moreover, apelin receptor is also present on muscle stem cells and promotes in vitro and in vivo cellular proliferation and differentiation of these cells into mature muscle cells that participate in muscle regeneration. Finally, muscle apelin could be used as a biomarker of physical exercise success in aged individuals since its production is correlated to the benefit of a chronic physical exercise in aged individuals.

In late 2022, the longevity therapeutics company BioAge announced that its licensed, orally-available apelin receptor agonist BGE-105 had greatly decreased muscle loss and sustained muscle quality and muscle protein synthesis during 10 days of bed rest in healthy volunteers aged 65 or older participating in a double-blind, placebo-controlled Phase 1b trial. They plan to proceed to a Phase 2 trial in older patients who are on ventilators in the intensive care unit (ICU). Such patients suffer both diaphragm atrophy (the weakening of the muscles that allow one to inhale and exhale, which atrophy dangerously due to disuse during time on a ventilator) and critical illness myopathy (the broad weakening of the muscles during extended bed rest). Each of these conditions are associated with poor functional recovery and substantially increased risk of death after illness.
