= Silvie Huijben =

American evolutionary biologist

- Education: Wageningen University and Research; University of Edinburgh
- Known for: Antimalarial resistance and insecticide resistance
- Scientific career
- Fields: Evolutionary biologist, disease ecologist, malariologist
- Workplaces: Arizona State University; Pennsylvania State University; Barcelona Biomedical Research Park (ISGlobal)

Silvie Huijben is an evolutionary biologist and assistant professor at Arizona State University. The Huijben Lab uses fieldwork, lab experiments, and mathematical modeling to study antimalarial and insecticide resistance in parasites, such as disease-transmitting mosquitoes. Her work is focused on applying evolutionary theory to produce resistance management strategies to best combat malaria.

== Education ==
Huijben received a PhD in cell, animal and population biology from the University of Edinburgh, UK (October 2006 to January 2010). She received a MSc in biology from Wageningen University, Netherlands (June 2003 to August 2006) and a BSc in biology (September 2000 to November 2004).

== Career ==
After completing her PhD in 2010, Huijben worked as a post-doctoral scholar at the Center for Infectious Disease Dynamics (CIDD), Pennsylvania State University, USA where she used a rodent malaria model to study the evolution of drug resistance. In November 2013 she began work as a post-doctoral fellow at Barcelona Institute for Global Health (ISGlobal), Barcelona, Spain. In June 2017 she became an Assistant Research Professor at ISGlobal before moving on to an assistant professor role at the Center for Evolution and Medicine, Arizona State University, USA in March 2018.

She has been an editorial board member of PLOS ONE since July 2018.

== Public engagement and media ==
Huijben has appeared on 2Scientists, was a panelist on a Virtual Keystone Symposia, and was featured on MESA presenting her research for the 67th ASTMH annual meeting.

== Research ==
The Huijben Lab focuses on the key question: how can we use evolutionary theory to better design resistance management strategies?. The lab's current research projects are centered around:

1. understanding the relation between insecticide resistance and malaria epidemiology
2. determining optimal insecticide resistance management strategies
3. determining optimal antimalarial resistance management strategies
4. understanding insecticide resistance patterns in the field

== Awards and recognition ==
In 2013, she was a recipient of the Marie Curie International Incoming Fellowship, and the Society in Science – Branco Weiss Fellowship to pursue her research in the evolution of drug and insecticide resistance.

In 2020, Dr. Huijben earned the Centennial Professorship Award at Arizona State University for her unique dedication to biological pedagogy.
