= FANCD2OS =

Protein-coding gene in the species Homo sapiens

Identifiers
- Aliases: FANCD2OS, C3orf24, FANCD2 opposite strand
- External IDs: MGI: 1918229; HomoloGene: 45456; GeneCards: FANCD2OS; OMA:FANCD2OS - orthologs

Gene location (Human)
Chr.	Chromosome 3 (human)
Band	3p25.3	Start	10,081,317 bp
Band	3p25.3	End	10,108,255 bp

Gene location (Mouse)
Chr.	Chromosome 6 (mouse)
Band	6|6 E3	Start	113,573,722 bp
Band	6|6 E3	End	113,577,676 bp
RNA expression pattern
Bgee	Human / Mouse (ortholog); Top expressed in: left testis; right testis; pancreatic ductal cell; sperm; testicle; gonad; muscle tissue; granulocyte; minor salivary glands; gastric mucosa / Top expressed in: seminiferous tubule; spermatid; proximal tubule; morula; embryo; right kidney; human kidney; spermatocyte; blastocyst; blastocyst; More reference expression data
BioGPS	n/a
Orthologs
Species	Human	Mouse
Entrez	115795	70979
Ensembl	ENSG00000163705	ENSMUSG00000033963
UniProt	Q96PS1	Q9D4K4
RefSeq (mRNA)	NM_173472; NM_001164839	NM_027633
RefSeq (protein)	NP_001158311; NP_775743	NP_081909
Location (UCSC)	Chr 3: 10.08 – 10.11 Mb	Chr 6: 113.57 – 113.58 Mb
PubMed search
- Wikidata
View/Edit Human	View/Edit Mouse

Fanconi Anemia Opposite Strand Transcript protein is a predicted protein that in humans is encoded by the FANCD2OS gene. The name is derived from mRNA transcribed from the strand complementary to the FANCD2 gene.

== Gene ==
The gene is encoded on Chromosome 3 (human) at p25.3 on the minus strand from 10081320-10108339nt. The primary transcript is 1105nt which codes for a protein of 177 amino acid in length. The gene on the strand complementary to FANCD2 located 5' from CYCSP11 and 3’ from BRK1 and VHL genes.

=== mRNA ===
There are six alternatively spliced transcripts with differences in the 5' and 3' ends as well changes in exon usage. The most common isoform is 1105 bp.

=== Promoter Region ===
The promoter region predicted by the Genomatix El Dorado algorithm spans from 10108742-10108009 bp. Promoters are associated with a wide variety of tissues including B-lymphocytes, germ cells, muscle, neurons & prostate.

=== Regulatory ===
Secondary structure of the 5’ UTR sequence conserved between humans and gibbon contain sequence recognized by to RBMX, Ras & Rab proteins. The sequence for the secondary structure of the 3’ UTR are recognized by EIF4B and RBMX.

== Expression ==
FANCD2OS is moderately expressed in the human brain, placenta and testes.

== Evolutionary History ==
=== Protein sequence ===
The protein from the longest transcript is 177AA in length with a mass of 20188.59kD. The protein consists of a domain of unknown function from the DUF4563 superfamily.

=== Orthologs ===
Orthologs of FANCD2OS exist throughout mammals, reptiles, birds and in the cartilaginous fish Australian ghostshark. The protein sequence undergoes mutation at a rate similar to the blood protein fibrinogen.

Species	Common name	NCBI accession	Identity	similarity	E-value
Pongo abelii	Sumatran orangutan	XP_003776240.1	98.9	99.4	1.21E-133
Cricetulus griseus	Chinese hamster	XP_003511850.1	73.6	80.9	1.56E-95
Ovis aries	Sheep	XP_004018322.1	97.2	98.3	6.79E-131
Leptonychotes weddellii	Weddell seal	XP_006739055.1	96.6	98.3	5.13E-130
Condylura cristata	Star-nosed mole	XP_004692437.1	91.0	95.5	3.01E-123
Orcinus orca	Killer whale	XP_004286877.2	88.1	92.3	1.05E-90
Trichechus manatus latirostris	Florida manatee	XP_004368376.1	96.6	98.9	9.95E-131
Alligator mississippiensis	American alligator	XP_014457972.1	69.3	88.6	1.40E-48
Chrysemys picta bellii	Painted turtle	XP_005307285.1	58.3	75	2.18E-78
Gekko japonicus	Schlegel's Japanese gecko	XP_015261231.1	56.5	72.3	4.39E-74
Thamnophis sirtalis	Common garter snake	XP_013914711.1	55.9	69.5	2.75E-69
Xenopus laevis	African clawed frog	NP_001088778.1	55.4	71.2	1.98E-68
Xenopus tropicalis	Western clawed frog	NP_001090717.1	52	71.2	3.57E-65
Callorhinchus milii	Australian ghostshark	XP_007888744.1	39.9	56.8	5.67E-43

=== Paralogs ===
FANCD2OS has no known paralogs in Homo sapiens.
