= Cell cycle regulator of NHEJ =

Protein-coding gene in humans

CYREN

Identifiers
- Aliases: CYREN, MRI, chromosome 7 open reading frame 49, MRI-2, C7orf49, cell cycle regulator of NHEJ
- External IDs: OMIM: 616980; MGI: 1925662; GeneCards: CYREN

Gene location (Human)
Chr.	Chromosome 7 (human)
Band	7q33	Start	135,092,363 bp
Band	7q33	End	135,170,795 bp

Gene location (Mouse)
Chr.	Chromosome 6 (mouse)
Band	6|6 B1	Start	34,848,706 bp
Band	6|6 B1	End	34,854,995 bp
RNA expression pattern
Bgee	Human / Mouse (ortholog); Top expressed in: gastrocnemius muscle; right lung; monocyte; granulocyte; right lobe of liver; upper lobe of left lung; C1 segment; gastric mucosa; Descending thoracic aorta; tibial nerve / Top expressed in: granulocyte; bone marrow; yolk sac; muscle of thigh; embryo; proximal tubule; quadriceps femoris muscle; muscle tissue; ventricular zone; liver; More reference expression data
BioGPS	n/a
Gene ontology
Molecular function	protein binding
Cellular component	cytoplasm; nucleus
Biological process	double-strand break repair via nonhomologous end joining; DNA repair; cellular response to DNA damage stimulus; negative regulation of double-strand break repair via nonhomologous end joining
Sources:Amigo / QuickGO
Orthologs
Databases	NCBI: entry; OMA: entry
Species	Human	Mouse
Entrez	78996	78412
Ensembl	ENSG00000122783	ENSMUSG00000046806
UniProt	Q9BWK5	Q8BHZ5
RefSeq (mRNA)	NM_024033; NM_001243749; NM_001243751; NM_001243752; NM_001243753 NM_001243754; NM_001243755; NM_001305629; NM_001305630; NM_001363329; NM_001363330	NM_001135611; NM_199145; NM_001347101
RefSeq (protein)	NP_001230678; NP_001230680; NP_001230681; NP_001230682; NP_001230683 NP_001230684; NP_001292558; NP_001292559; NP_076938; NP_001350258; NP_001350259	NP_001129083; NP_001334030; NP_954596
Location (UCSC)	Chr 7: 135.09 – 135.17 Mb	Chr 6: 34.85 – 34.85 Mb
PubMed search
- Wikidata
View/Edit Human	View/Edit Mouse

Cell cycle regulator of NHEJ is a protein that in humans is encoded by the CYREN gene. It can either activate or inhibit classical non-homologous end joining (NHEJ), a method of repair of double-stranded DNA breaks. This protein is therefore important in regulating DNA repair.

When alternatively spliced, is predicted to produce three different micropeptides.

- MRI-1 was previously found to be a modulator of retrovirus infection.
- MRI-2 may be important in non-homologous end joining (NHEJ) of DNA double strand breaks. In Co-Immunoprecipitation experiments, MRI-2 bound to Ku70 and Ku80, two subunits of Ku, which play a major role in the NHEJ pathway.
- MRI-3
