= ML221 =

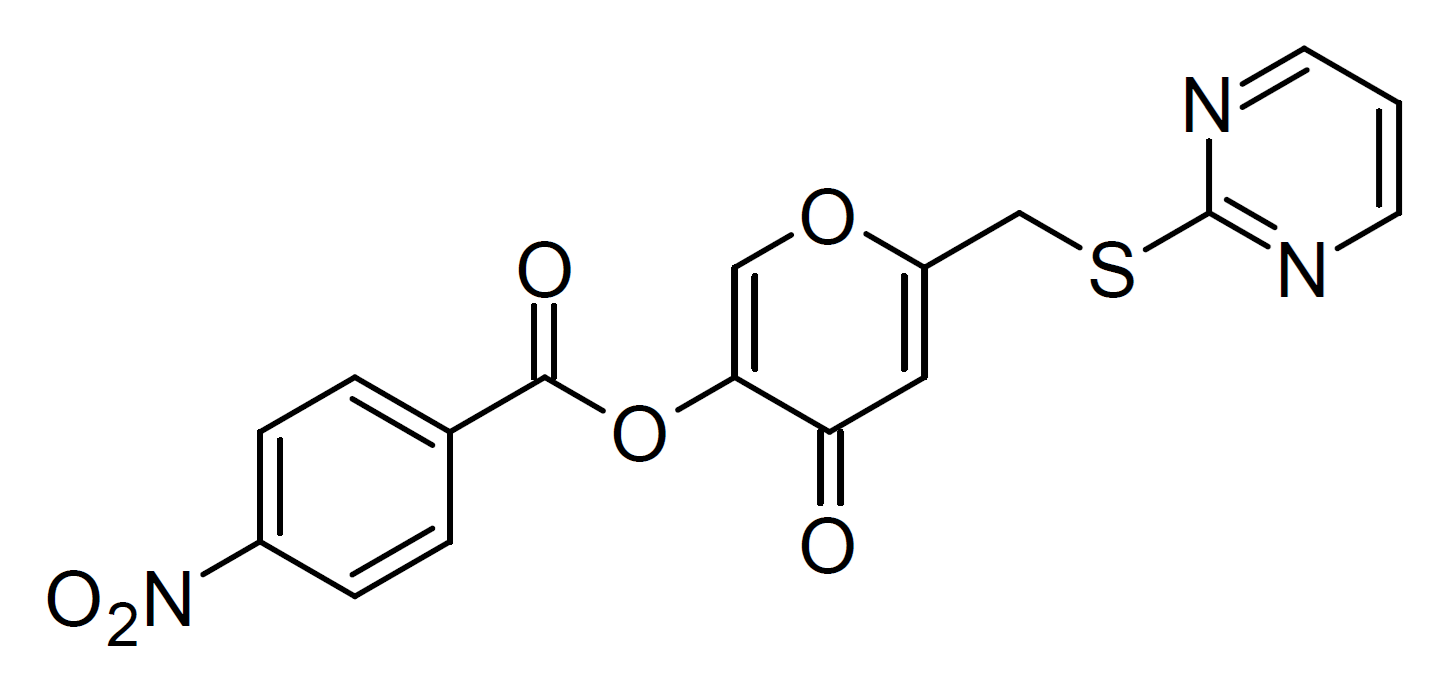

Identifiers
- IUPAC name: 4-oxo-6-((pyrimidin-2-ylthio)methyl)-4H-pyran-3-yl 4-nitrobenzoate
- CAS Number: 877636-42-5
- PubChem CID: 7217941

Chemical and physical data
- Formula: C_{17}H_{11}N_{3}O_{6}S
- Molar mass: 385.35 g·mol^{−1}
- 3D model (JSmol): Interactive image
- SMILES: C1=CN=C(N=C1)SCC2=CC(=O)C(=CO2)OC(=O)C3=CC=C(C=C3)[N+](=O)[O-]
- InChI: InChI=1S/C17H11N3O6S/c21-14-8-13(10-27-17-18-6-1-7-19-17)25-9-15(14)26-16(22)11-2-4-12(5-3-11)20(23)24/h1-9H,10H2; Key:UASIRTUMPRQVFY-UHFFFAOYSA-N

ML221 is a drug which is a selective, small-molecule antagonist for the apelin receptor. It is primarily used for research into the function of this receptor pathway, but also has potential medical applications.
