= CMF-019 =

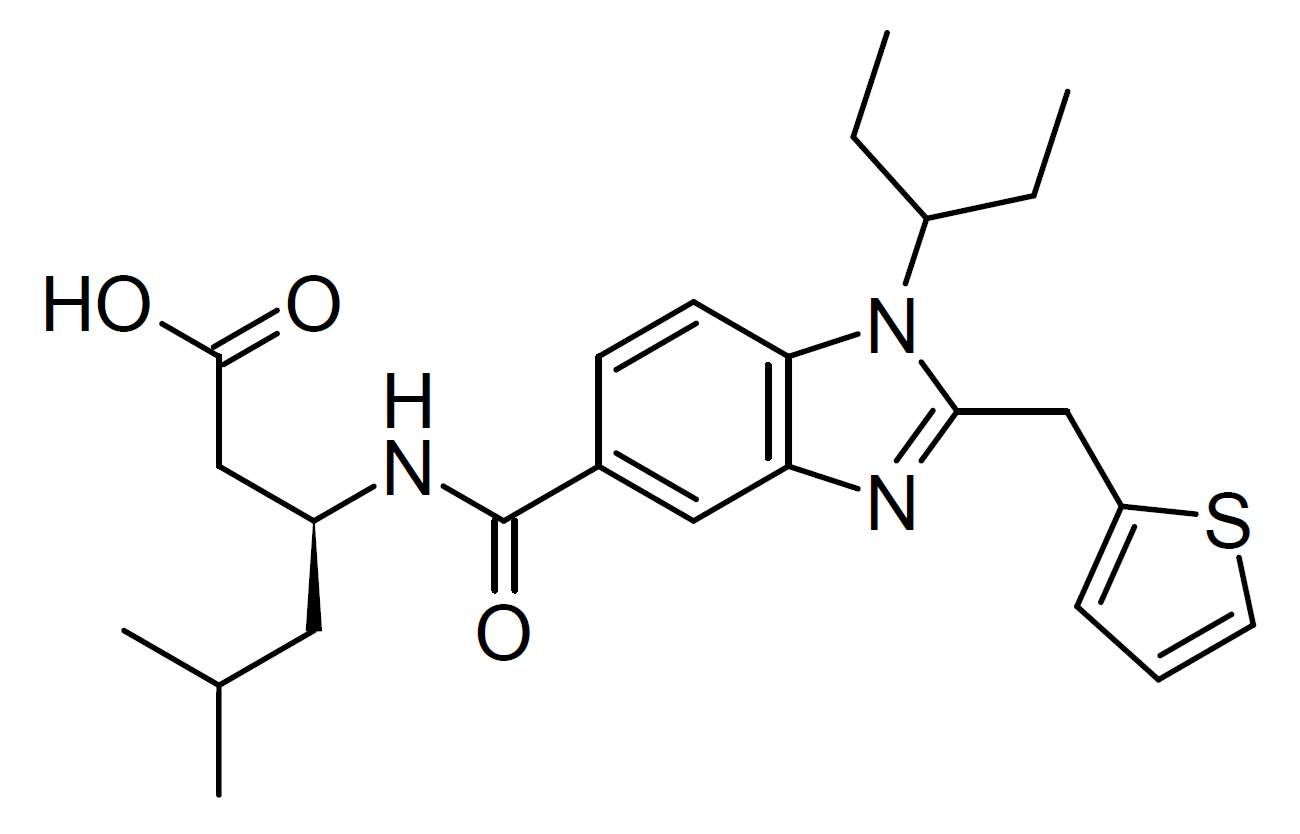

Identifiers
- IUPAC name: (3S)-5-methyl-3-[[1-pentan-3-yl-2-(thiophen-2-ylmethyl)benzimidazole-5-carbonyl]amino]hexanoic acid
- CAS Number: 1586787-08-7
- PubChem CID: 73442763

Chemical and physical data
- Formula: C_{25}H_{33}N_{3}O_{3}S
- Molar mass: 455.62 g·mol^{−1}
- 3D model (JSmol): Interactive image
- SMILES: CCC(CC)N1C2=C(C=C(C=C2)C(=O)N[C@@H](CC(C)C)CC(=O)O)N=C1CC3=CC=CS3
- InChI: InChI=1S/C25H33N3O3S/c1-5-19(6-2)28-22-10-9-17(25(31)26-18(12-16(3)4)14-24(29)30)13-21(22)27-23(28)15-20-8-7-11-32-20/h7-11,13,16,18-19H,5-6,12,14-15H2,1-4H3,(H,26,31)(H,29,30)/t18-/m0/s1; Key:VCQKKZXFASLXAH-SFHVURJKSA-N

CMF-019 is a drug which is a selective, small-molecule agonist for the apelin receptor. It is used in research into treatment for heart failure.

== See also ==
- AM-8123
- Azelaprag
- BMS-986224
