= BMS-986224 =

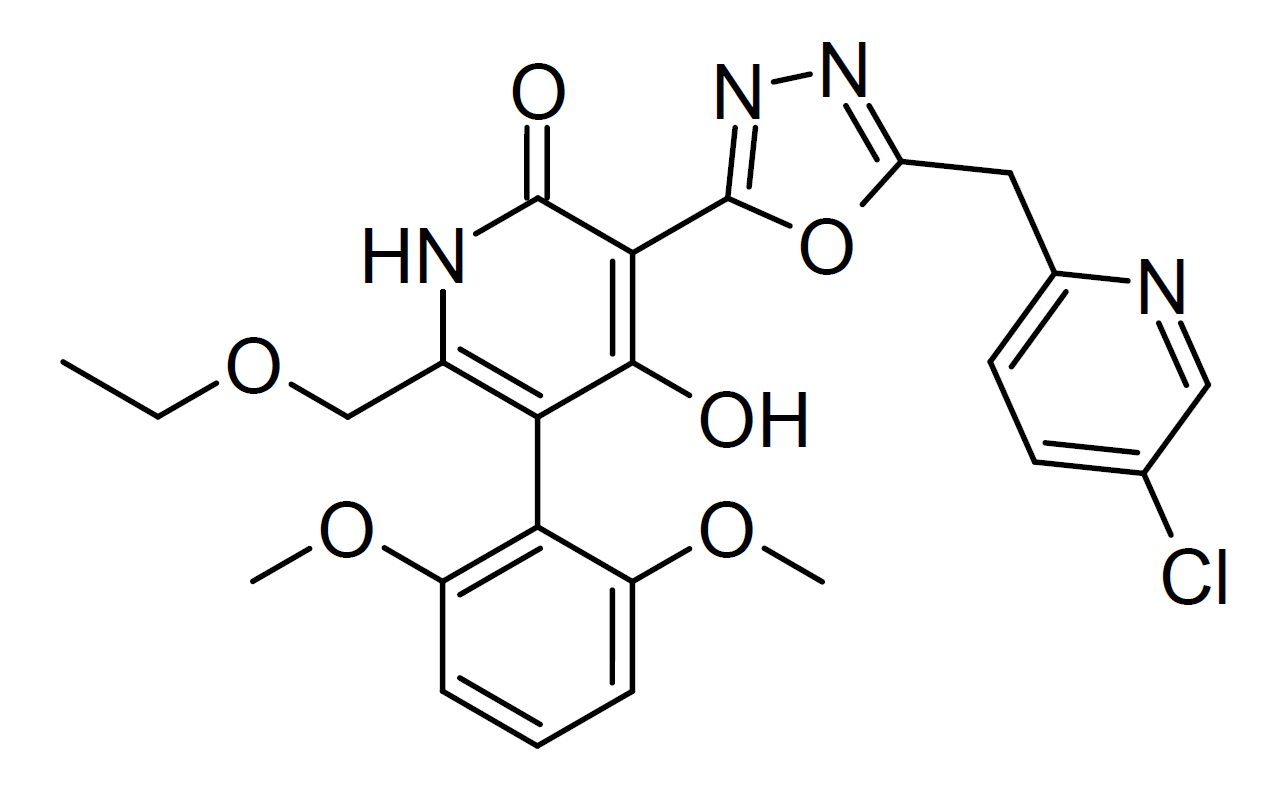

Identifiers
- IUPAC name: 3-[5-[(5-chloro-2-pyridinyl)methyl]-1,3,4-oxadiazol-2-yl]-5-(2,6-dimethoxyphenyl)-6-(ethoxymethyl)-4-hydroxy-1H-pyridin-2-one
- CAS Number: 2055200-88-7
- PubChem CID: 137106310
- UNII: N5O33BF03F

Chemical and physical data
- Formula: C_{24}H_{23}ClN_{4}O_{6}
- Molar mass: 498.92 g·mol^{−1}
- 3D model (JSmol): Interactive image
- SMILES: CCOCC1=C(C(=C(C(=O)N1)C2=NN=C(O2)CC3=NC=C(C=C3)Cl)O)C4=C(C=CC=C4OC)OC
- InChI: InChI=1S/C24H23ClN4O6/c1-4-34-12-15-19(20-16(32-2)6-5-7-17(20)33-3)22(30)21(23(31)27-15)24-29-28-18(35-24)10-14-9-8-13(25)11-26-14/h5-9,11H,4,10,12H2,1-3H3,(H2,27,30,31); Key:AGZKELPIAJYRDT-UHFFFAOYSA-N

BMS-986224 is a drug which is a selective, small-molecule agonist for the apelin receptor. It has been researched for the treatment of heart failure.

== See also ==
- Azelaprag
- AM-8123
- CMF-019
