= AM-8123 =

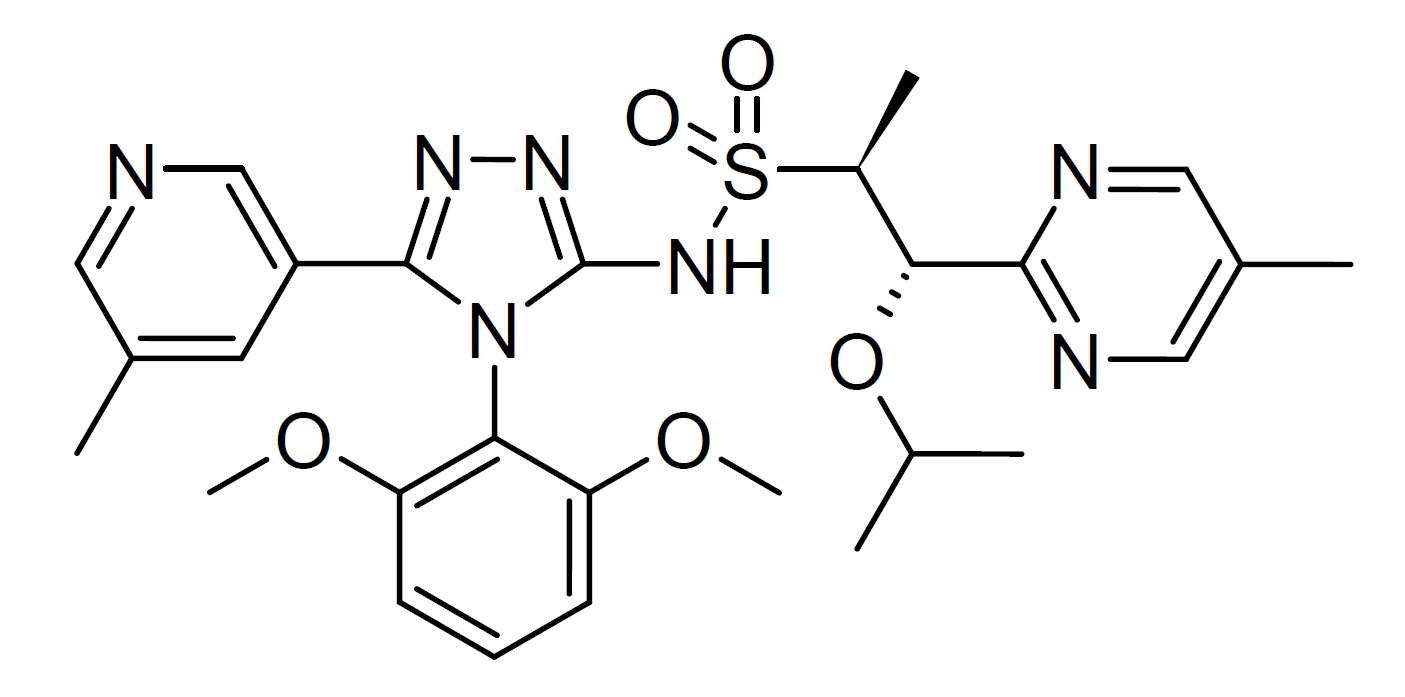

Identifiers
- IUPAC name: (1S,2S)-N-[4-(2,6-dimethoxyphenyl)-5-(5-methyl-3-pyridinyl)-1,2,4-triazol-3-yl]-1-(5-methylpyrimidin-2-yl)-1-propan-2-yloxypropane-2-sulfonamide
- CAS Number: 2049973-02-4
- PubChem CID: 122702584

Chemical and physical data
- Formula: C_{27}H_{33}N_{7}O_{5}S
- Molar mass: 567.67 g·mol^{−1}
- 3D model (JSmol): Interactive image
- SMILES: CC1=CC(=CN=C1)C2=NN=C(N2C3=C(C=CC=C3OC)OC)NS(=O)(=O)[C@@H](C)[C@H](C4=NC=C(C=N4)C)OC(C)C
- InChI: InChI=1S/C27H33N7O5S/c1-16(2)39-24(25-29-13-18(4)14-30-25)19(5)40(35,36)33-27-32-31-26(20-11-17(3)12-28-15-20)34(27)23-21(37-6)9-8-10-22(23)38-7/h8-16,19,24H,1-7H3,(H,32,33)/t19-,24+/m0/s1; Key:RKKBDGLXAWMONW-YADARESESA-N

AM-8123 is a drug which is a selective, small-molecule agonist for the apelin receptor. It is used in research into treatment for heart failure.

== See also ==
- Azelaprag
- BMS-986224
- CMF-019
