= Mohammed Al-Raqad =

Jordanian physician and Brigadier General (b. 1967)

Mohammed Kasseb Al-Raqad
- محمد كاسب الرقاد
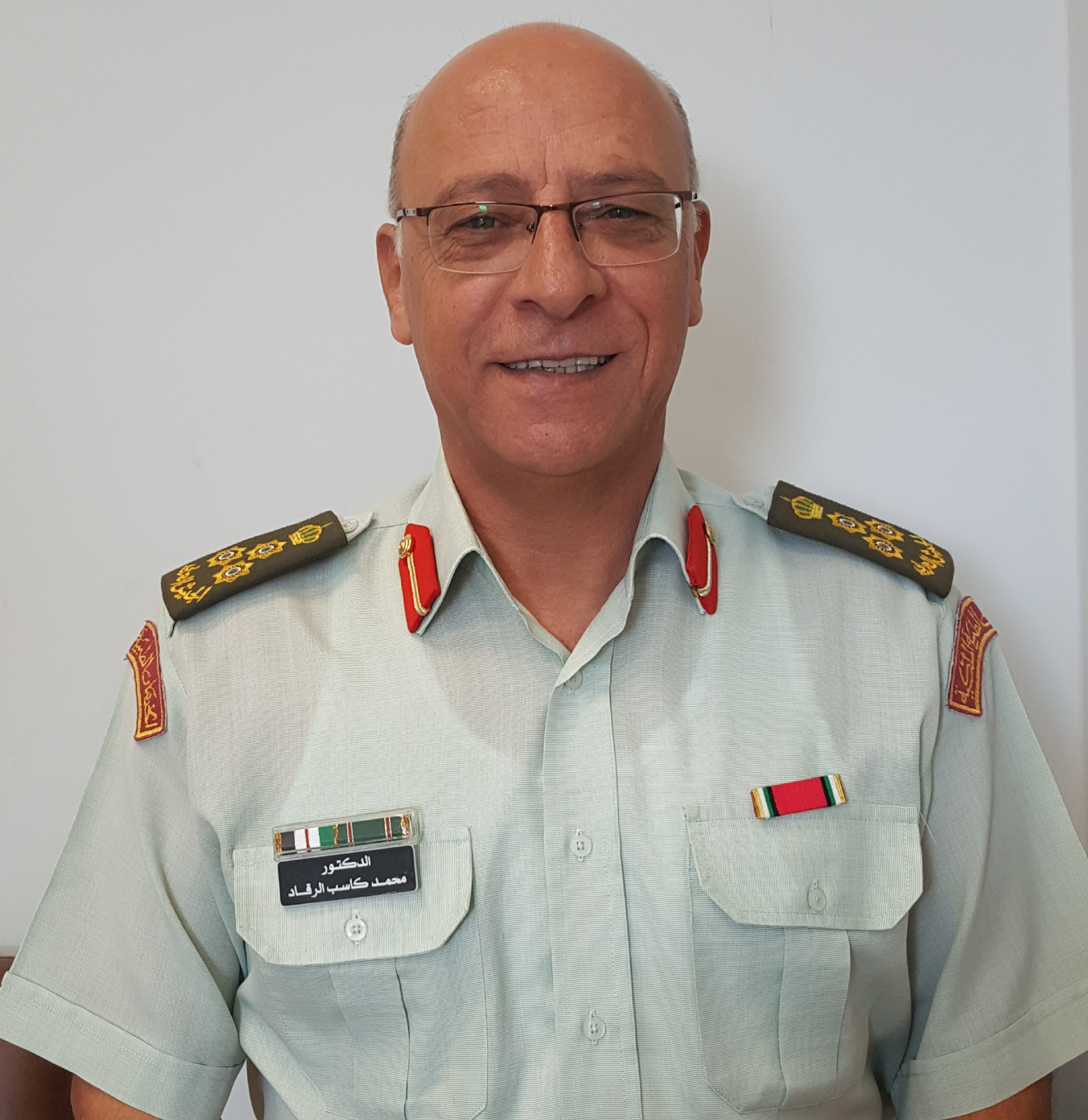
- Born: 1967 (age 58–59); Musherfat Al-Raqad
- Citizenship: Jordan
- Known for: Al-Raqad syndrome
- Awards: Military Order of Merit, NATO Medal
- Scientific career
- Fields: Clinical genetics
- Institutions: King Hussein Medical Center

Signature
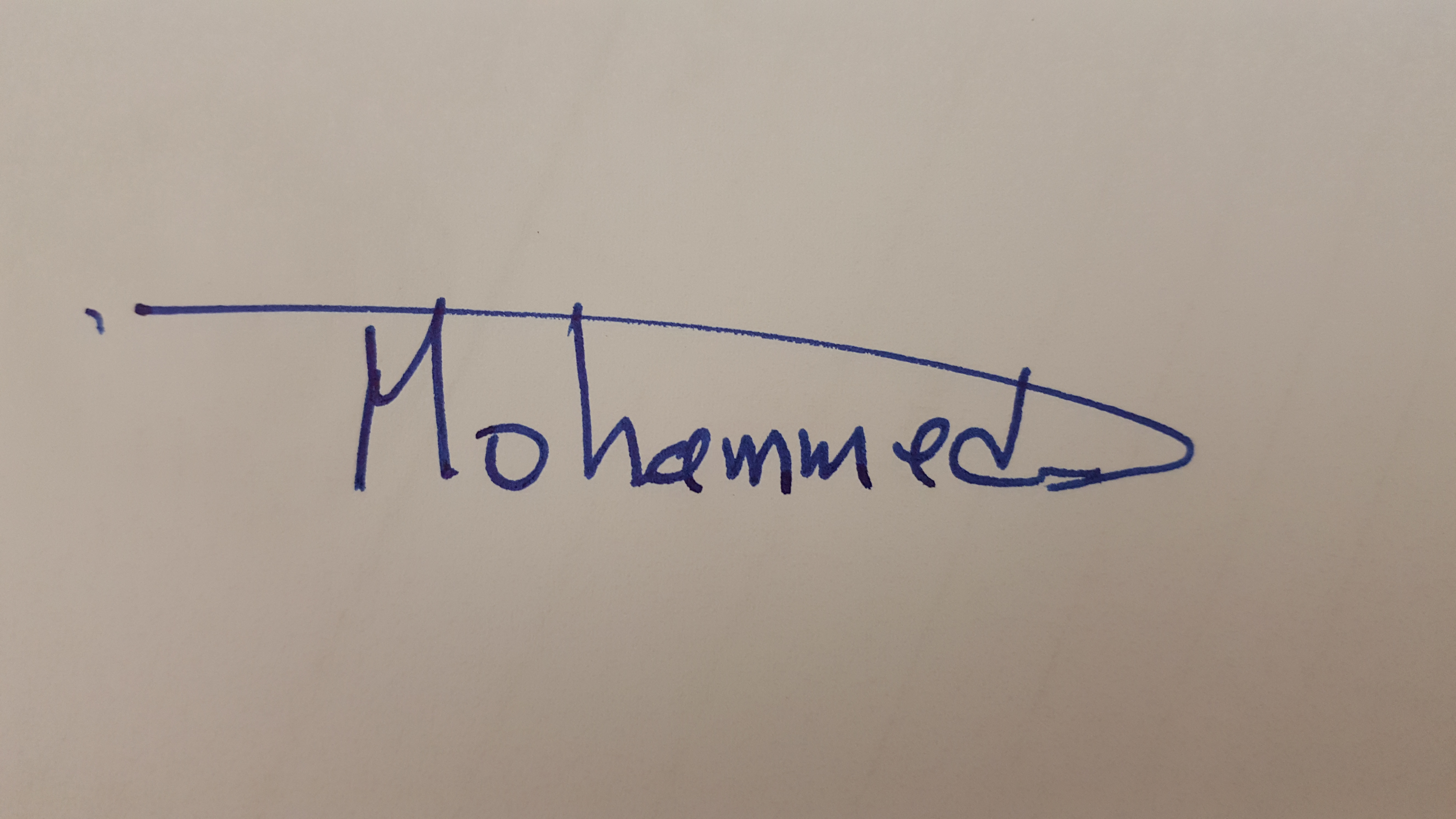

Mohammed Kasseb Al-Raqad is a Jordanian physician, a Brigadier general in the Jordanian Royal medical services and a consultant in the field of clinical genetics.

== Qualifications ==
- M.B.B.S. Degree in medicine and surgery 9 June 1991: University of Jordan, School of Medicine, Amman, Jordan
- Doctoral degree in Clinical Genetics 11/2/2011. Newcastle upon Tyne University/UK.
- MSc in Medical Genetics 3 December 2004 from University of Glasgow /UK.
- Jordanian Board of Paediatrics September 1997, issued by The Jordanian Medical Council.
- Permanent License to practice pediatrics Medicine, Jordan 1997.
- Permanent License to practice Medicine, Jordan 1992.

== Positions & social activities ==
- Consultant of clinical genetics at Queen Rania Al-Abdullah Children Hospital/King Hussein Medical Centre, Royal Medical Services, Amman-Jordan.
- Head of the clinical genetic unit at Queen Rania Al-Abdullah Children's Hospital/King Hussein Medical Centre.
- Part-time lecturer at faculty of Medicine in Jordan University of Science & Technology since 2011.
- Field Hospital Pediatrician in Ramallah, Palestine; May- June 2002.
- Director of the Field Jordanian Hospital in Gaza, Palestine; April- July 2013.
- Member of Jordanian Medical Association.
- Member of Jordanian Pediatric Association.

== Awards ==
- Military Order of Merit; honoured by King Abdullah II, a reward for his contribution in scientific research on June 10, 2015.
- NATO Medal for service with NATO operations in relation to Kosovo during period of May 10, 1999-Feb 12, 2000 as a field hospital Pediatrician.
