= Elabela =

Mammalian peptide found in Homo sapiens

APELA

Identifiers
- Aliases: APELA, ELA, Ende, tdl, apelin receptor early endogenous ligand
- External IDs: OMIM: 615594; MGI: 3642370; GeneCards: APELA

Gene location (Human)
Chr.	Chromosome 4 (human)
Band	4q32.3	Start	164,877,178 bp
Band	4q32.3	End	164,898,965 bp

Gene location (Mouse)
Chr.	Chromosome 8 (mouse)
Band	8 B3.1|8	Start	65,481,069 bp
Band	8 B3.1|8	End	65,489,988 bp
RNA expression pattern
Bgee	Human / Mouse (ortholog); Top expressed in: tibia; testicle; buccal mucosa cell; mucosa of paranasal sinus; palpebral conjunctiva; olfactory zone of nasal mucosa; prostate; skin of abdomen; placenta; skin of hip / Top expressed in: medullary collecting duct; tail of embryo; primitive streak; endocardial cushion; right kidney; human kidney; atrioventricular valve; definitive endoderm; embryo; hand; More reference expression data
BioGPS	n/a
Gene ontology
Molecular function	hormone activity; apelin receptor binding
Cellular component	extracellular region; extracellular space
Biological process	multicellular organism development; mesendoderm migration; cell migration involved in mesendoderm migration; endoderm development; gastrulation; development of the heart; SMAD protein signal transduction; positive regulation of angiogenesis; apelin receptor signaling pathway; positive regulation of G protein-coupled receptor internalization; regulation of signaling receptor activity; vasculogenesis; mesoderm migration involved in gastrulation; adult heart development; embryonic heart tube development; positive regulation of heart contraction; placenta blood vessel development; coronary vasculature development; positive regulation of ERK1 and ERK2 cascade; positive regulation of trophoblast cell migration; positive regulation of blood vessel endothelial cell proliferation involved in sprouting angiogenesis; angiogenesis; cell differentiation
Sources:Amigo / QuickGO
Orthologs
Databases	NCBI: entry; OMA: entry
Species	Human	Mouse
Entrez	100506013	100038489
Ensembl	ENSG00000248329	ENSMUSG00000079042
UniProt	P0DMC3	P0DMC4
RefSeq (mRNA)	NM_001297550	NM_001297554; NM_001399422
RefSeq (protein)	NP_001284479	NP_001284483; NP_001386351
Location (UCSC)	Chr 4: 164.88 – 164.9 Mb	Chr 8: 65.48 – 65.49 Mb
PubMed search
- Wikidata
View/Edit Human	View/Edit Mouse

ELABELA (ELA, Apela, Toddler) is a hormonal peptide that in humans is encoded by the APELA gene. Elabela is one of two endogenous ligands for the G-protein-coupled APLNR receptor.

Ela is secreted by certain cell types including human embryonic stem cells. It is widely expressed in various developing organs such as the blastocyst, placenta, heart, kidney, endothelium, and is circulating in human plasma.

== Discovery ==
Elabela is a micropeptide that was identified in 2013 by Professor Bruno Reversade's team.

== Biosynthesis ==
Elabela gene encodes a pre-proprotein of 54 amino acids, with a signal peptide in the N-terminal region. After translocation into the endoplasmic reticulum and cleavage of the signal peptide, the proprotein of 32 amino acids may generate several active fragments.

== Physiological functions ==
The sites of APLNR receptor expression are linked to the different functions played by Elabela in the organism. Despite that, Elabela is capable of signaling independently of APLNR in human embryonic stem cells and certain cancer cell lines including OVISE.

=== Embryonic pluripotency ===
The Elabela protein is synthesized, processed and secreted by undifferentiated human embryonic stem cells but not mouse embryonic stem cells. In humans it is under the direct regulation of POU5F1 (a.k.a. OCT4) and NANOG.

Through autocrine and paracrine signalling, endogenous Elabela entrains the PI3K/AKT/mTOR pathway to maintain pluripotency and self-renewal.

=== Vascular ===
Elabela is expressed by midline tissues (such as the notochord in zebrafish and neural tube in mammals) during organogenesis.

There it serves as a chemoattractant to angioblasts expressing APLNR at their cell surface. This participates in the formation of the first and secondary vessels of the vascular system.

=== Cardiac ===
The ELABELA -APLNR signaling axis is required for formation of the coronary vessels of the heart in mice through the sinus venosus progenitors.

=== Pre-eclampsia ===
ELA is a secreted into the bloodstream by the developing placenta. Pregnant mice lacking Ela, exhibit pre-eclampsia-like symptoms, characterized by proteinuria and gestational hypertension.

Infusion of exogenous ELA normalizes blood pressure and prevents intrauterine growth retardation in pups born to Ela knockout mothers. ELA increases the invasiveness of trophoblast-like cells, suggesting that it may enhance placental development to prevent eclampsia.

== Therapeutics ==
Several mimetics of ELA have been developed for therapeutic purposes. Amgen has created a camel antibody and a small molecule agonist capable of mimicking the function of ELA towards it cognate receptor APLNR.

The latter has entered phase 1 clinical trials for heart failure and acute kidney disease. Bristol Myers Squibb has also created its own small molecule agonist of APLNR.

An opinion published in the Lancet in 2019 suggested that ELABELA could be used to treat intrauterine growth restriction and maternal morbidity linked to eclampsia.
