= NBDY =

Protein-coding gene in the species Homo sapiens

Identifiers
- Aliases: NBDY, LINC01420, negative regulator of P-body association, NoBody
- External IDs: OMIM: 300992; MGI: 1917373; GeneCards: NBDY

Gene location (Human)
Chr.	X chromosome (human)
Band	Xp11.21	Start	56,729,241 bp
Band	Xp11.21	End	56,819,179 bp

Gene location (Mouse)
Chr.	X chromosome (mouse)
Band	X|X F3	Start	152,506,586 bp
Band	X|X F3	End	152,524,916 bp
RNA expression pattern
Bgee	Human / Mouse (ortholog); Top expressed in: islet of Langerhans; myocardium of left ventricle; cardiac muscle tissue of right atrium; skin of arm; cartilage tissue; corpus epididymis; stromal cell of endometrium; prefrontal cortex; ganglionic eminence; decidua / Top expressed in: epithelium of lens; superior cervical ganglion; Epithelium of choroid plexus; hand; endocardial cushion; facial motor nucleus; interventricular septum; otolith organ; utricle; supraoptic nucleus; More reference expression data
BioGPS	n/a
Gene ontology
Molecular function	protein binding
Cellular component	P-body; cytoplasm
Biological process	nuclear-transcribed mRNA catabolic process; mRNA processing; negative regulation of cytoplasmic mRNA processing body assembly
Sources:Amigo / QuickGO
Orthologs
Databases	NCBI: entry; OMA: entry
Species	Human	Mouse
Entrez	550643	70123
Ensembl	ENSG00000204272	ENSMUSG00000086316
UniProt	A0A0U1RRE5	n/a
RefSeq (mRNA)	NM_001348129	NM_027327
RefSeq (protein)	NP_001335058	n/a
Location (UCSC)	Chr X: 56.73 – 56.82 Mb	Chr X: 152.51 – 152.52 Mb
PubMed search
- Wikidata
View/Edit Human	View/Edit Mouse

Negative regulator of P-body association is a protein that in humans is encoded by the NBDY gene.
