= DCPS (gene) =

Protein-coding gene in the species Homo sapiens

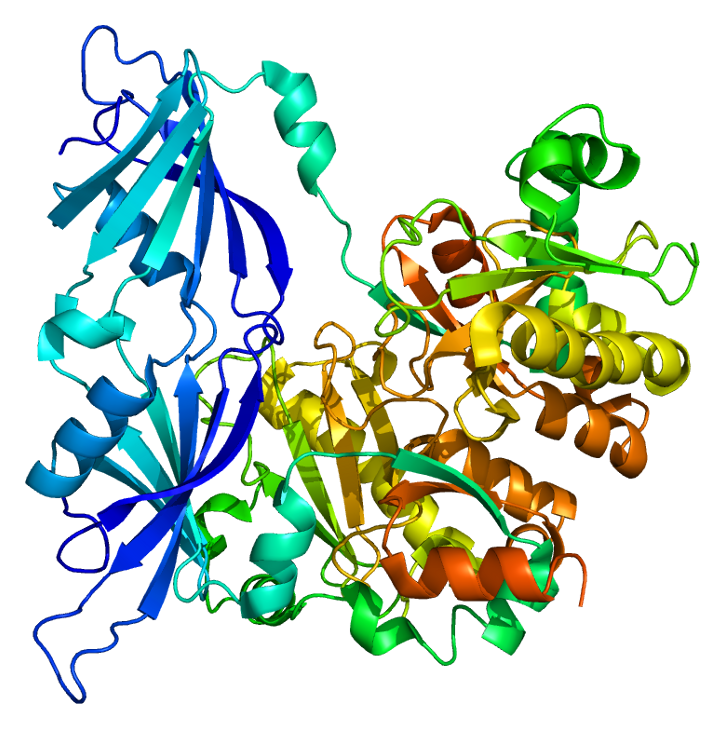

Identifiers
- Aliases: DCPS, DCS1, HINT-5, HINT5, HSL1, ARS, HSPC015, decapping enzyme, scavenger
- External IDs: OMIM: 610534; MGI: 1916555; GeneCards: DCPS
Available structures
PDB	Ortholog search: PDBe RCSB
PDB	List of PDB id codes 1ST0, 1ST4, 1XML, 1XMM, 3BL7, 3BL9, 3BLA, 4QDE, 4QDV, 4QEB
Enzyme activity
EC #	BRENDA	ExPASy	KEGG	MetaCyc
3.6.1.59	↗	↗	↗	↗

Gene location (Human)
Chr.	Chromosome 11 (human)
Band	11q24.2	Start	126,304,060 bp
Band	11q24.2	End	126,350,005 bp

Gene location (Mouse)
Chr.	Chromosome 9 (mouse)
Band	9|9 A4	Start	35,035,704 bp
Band	9|9 A4	End	35,087,357 bp
RNA expression pattern
Bgee	Human / Mouse (ortholog); Top expressed in: right lobe of liver; oocyte; muscle of thigh; granulocyte; secondary oocyte; gallbladder; gonad; mucosa of transverse colon; stromal cell of endometrium; spleen / Top expressed in: yolk sac; ventricular zone; epiblast; embryo; otic placode; embryo; endocardial cushion; medial ganglionic eminence; right kidney; primitive streak; More reference expression data
BioGPS	n/a
Gene ontology
Molecular function	m7G(5')pppN diphosphatase activity; protein binding; hydrolase activity; RNA 7-methylguanosine cap binding; exoribonuclease activity
Cellular component	cytoplasm; mitochondrion; nucleus; nucleoplasm; P-body; cytosol
Biological process	mRNA cis splicing, via spliceosome; negative regulation of programmed cell death; mRNA processing; nuclear-transcribed mRNA catabolic process, deadenylation-dependent decay; cellular response to menadione; RNA splicing; exonucleolytic catabolism of deadenylated mRNA; RNA phosphodiester bond hydrolysis, exonucleolytic; deadenylation-dependent decapping of nuclear-transcribed mRNA
Sources:Amigo / QuickGO
Orthologs
Databases	NCBI: entry; OMA: entry
Species	Human	Mouse
Entrez	28960	69305
Ensembl	ENSG00000110063	ENSMUSG00000032040
UniProt	Q96C86	Q9DAR7
RefSeq (mRNA)	NM_014026; NM_001350236	NM_027030
RefSeq (protein)	NP_054745; NP_001337165	NP_081306
Location (UCSC)	Chr 11: 126.3 – 126.35 Mb	Chr 9: 35.04 – 35.09 Mb
PubMed search
- Wikidata
View/Edit Human	View/Edit Mouse

Scavenger mRNA decapping enzyme (DcpS) N-terminal
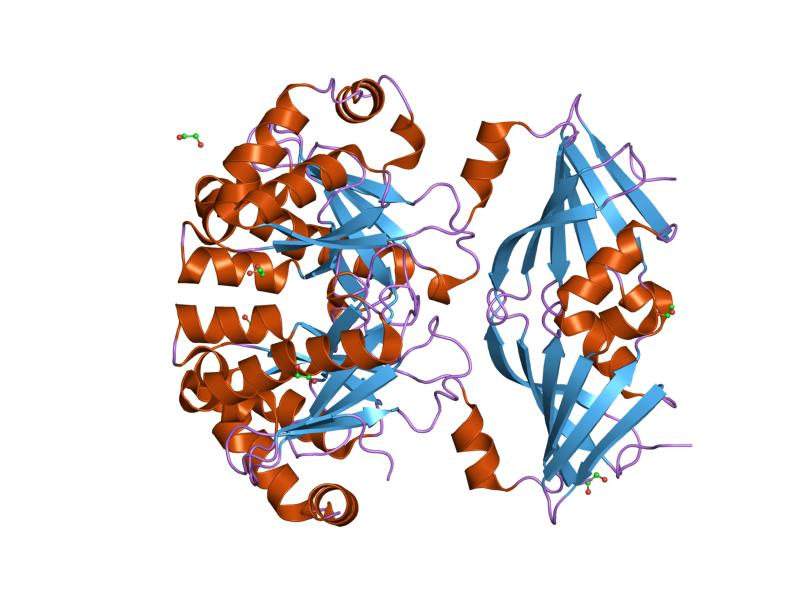
- crystal structure of mrna decapping enzyme (dcps) from mus musculus at 1.83 a resolution

Identifiers
- Symbol: DcpS
- Pfam: PF05652
- InterPro: IPR008594
- SCOP2: 1st4 / SCOPe / SUPFAM
Available protein structures:
- PDB: IPR008594 PF05652 (ECOD; PDBsum)
- AlphaFold: IPR008594; PF05652

Scavenger mRNA decapping enzyme C-term binding

Identifiers
- Symbol: DcpS_C
- Pfam: PF11969
- Pfam clan: CL0265
- SCOP2: 1st4 / SCOPe / SUPFAM
Available protein structures:
- PDB: PF11969 (ECOD; PDBsum)
- AlphaFold: PF11969

Scavenger mRNA-decapping enzyme DcpS is a protein that in humans is encoded by the DCPS gene.

The scavenger mRNA decapping enzymes include Dcp2 and DcpS. DcpS is a scavenger pyrophosphatase that hydrolyses the residual cap structure following 3' to 5' mRNA degradation. DcpS uses cap dinucleotides or capped oligonucleotides as substrates to release m(7)GMP (N7-methyl GMP), while Dcp2 uses capped mRNA as a substrate in order to hydrolyse the cap to release m(7)GDP (N7-methyl GDP). The association of DcpS with 3' to 5' exonuclease exosome components suggests that these two activities are linked and there is a coupled exonucleolytic decay-dependent decapping pathway. The family contains a histidine triad (HIT) sequence in its C-terminal domain, with three histidines separated by hydrophobic residues. The central histidine within the DcpS HIT motif is critical for decapping activity and defines the HIT motif as a new mRNA decapping domain, making DcpS the first member of the HIT family of proteins with a defined biological function.

== See also ==
- Al-Raqad syndrome
