= BRK1 =

Protein-coding gene in the species Homo sapiens

Identifiers
- Aliases: BRK1, C3orf10, MDS027, hHBrk1, HSPC300, BRICK1, SCAR/WAVE actin nucleating complex subunit, BRICK1 subunit of SCAR/WAVE actin nucleating complex
- External IDs: OMIM: 611183; MGI: 1915406; GeneCards: BRK1
Available structures
PDB	Ortholog search: PDBe RCSB
PDB	List of PDB id codes 3P8C, 4N78

Gene location (Human)
Chr.	Chromosome 3 (human)
Band	3p25.3	Start	10,115,675 bp
Band	3p25.3	End	10,127,190 bp

Gene location (Mouse)
Chr.	Chromosome 6 (mouse)
Band	6|6 E3	Start	113,581,733 bp
Band	6|6 E3	End	113,593,912 bp
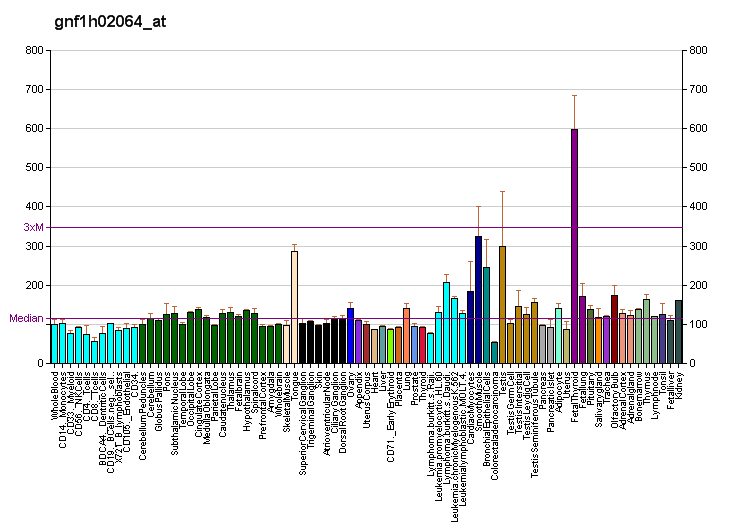

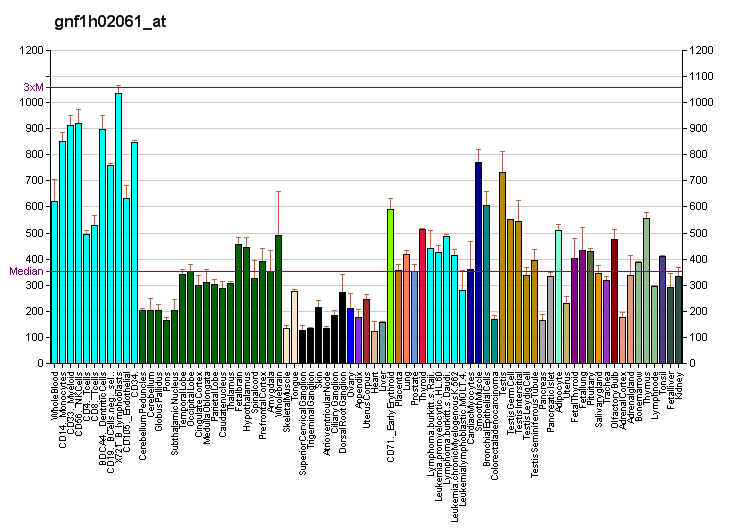
RNA expression pattern
Bgee	Human / Mouse (ortholog); Top expressed in: sperm; skin of arm; islet of Langerhans; right testis; monocyte; tibial arteries; left coronary artery; right coronary artery; left testis; smooth muscle tissue / Top expressed in: medullary collecting duct; external carotid artery; endocardial cushion; saccule; internal carotid artery; ureter; renal corpuscle; olfactory tubercle; epithelium of lens; otic vesicle; More reference expression data
BioGPS	More reference expression data
Gene ontology
Molecular function	protein binding; protein-containing complex binding; identical protein binding
Cellular component	cytoplasm; cytosol; extracellular exosome; cytoskeleton; SCAR complex; lamellipodium
Biological process	vascular endothelial growth factor receptor signaling pathway; Rac protein signal transduction; positive regulation of Arp2/3 complex-mediated actin nucleation; in utero embryonic development; positive regulation of lamellipodium assembly; actin cytoskeleton organization; Fc-gamma receptor signaling pathway involved in phagocytosis; positive regulation of cell population proliferation; protein homotrimerization; actin filament organization; cell motility; regulation of actin polymerization or depolymerization; positive regulation of protein-containing complex assembly
Sources:Amigo / QuickGO
Orthologs
Databases	NCBI: entry; OMA: entry
Species	Human	Mouse
Entrez	55845	101314
Ensembl	ENSG00000254999	ENSMUSG00000033940
UniProt	Q8WUW1	Q91VR8
RefSeq (mRNA)	NM_018462	NM_133937
RefSeq (protein)	NP_060932	NP_598698
Location (UCSC)	Chr 3: 10.12 – 10.13 Mb	Chr 6: 113.58 – 113.59 Mb
PubMed search
- Wikidata
View/Edit Human	View/Edit Mouse

BRICK1 is a putative micropeptide protein that in humans is encoded by the C3orf10 gene.
