= BLTP1 =

Protein-coding gene in the species Homo sapiens

Identifiers
- Aliases: BLTP1, 4932438A13Rik, 4732443H21, B830039D19Rik, D630029K19Rik, FSA, Kiaa1109, Tweek, ALKKUCS
- External IDs: OMIM: 611565; MGI: 2444631; GeneCards: BLTP1

Gene location (Human)
Chr.	Chromosome 4 (human)
Band	4q27	Start	122,152,331 bp
Band	4q27	End	122,364,167 bp

Gene location (Mouse)
Chr.	Chromosome 3 (mouse)
Band	3|3 B	Start	36,917,253 bp
Band	3|3 B	End	37,107,182 bp
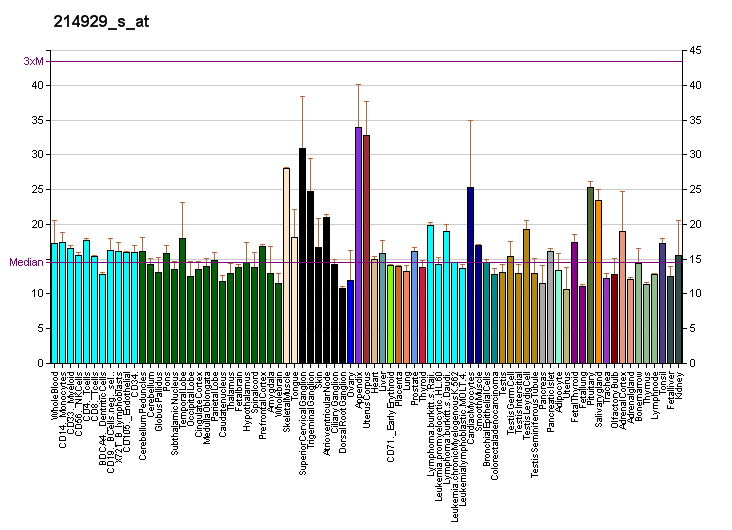
RNA expression pattern
Bgee	Human / Mouse (ortholog); Top expressed in: Brodmann area 23; corpus callosum; postcentral gyrus; Achilles tendon; Skeletal muscle tissue of rectus abdominis; biceps brachii; skin of hip; lateral nuclear group of thalamus; jejunal mucosa; cerebellar vermis / Top expressed in: spermatocyte; spermatid; granulocyte; lobe of cerebellum; cerebellar vermis; nucleus accumbens; dorsal striatum; dorsomedial hypothalamic nucleus; thymus; neural layer of retina; More reference expression data
BioGPS	More reference expression data
Gene ontology
Molecular function	protein binding
Cellular component	integral component of membrane; membrane; nucleus; presynapse
Biological process	regulation of epithelial cell differentiation; regulation of cell growth; synaptic vesicle endocytosis
Sources:Amigo / QuickGO
Orthologs
Databases	NCBI: entry; OMA: entry
Species	Human	Mouse
Entrez	84162	229227
Ensembl	ENSG00000138688	ENSMUSG00000037270
UniProt	Q2LD37	A2AAE1
RefSeq (mRNA)	NM_015312; NM_032202; NM_001384125	NM_172679
RefSeq (protein)	NP_056127; NP_001371054	NP_766267
Location (UCSC)	Chr 4: 122.15 – 122.36 Mb	Chr 3: 36.92 – 37.11 Mb
PubMed search
- Wikidata
View/Edit Human	View/Edit Mouse

Bridge-like lipid transfer protein family member 1 BLTP1 (previously known as KIAA1109) is a protein that in humans is encoded by the BLTP1 gene. This protein functions as a molecular bridge involved in the transport of lipids from the endoplasmic reticulum to phospholipid membranes.

Other aliases included FSA (fragile site-associated) protein, MGC110967 and DKFZp781P0474.

An ortholog of BLTP1 has been found in Drosophila, responsible for regulating synaptic vesicle recycling and certain brain related functions. Drosophila exhibiting mutated BLTP1 were unable to walk or stand upright for long periods and exhibited seizures, reminiscent of severe neurological defects. This led to it being given the name "Tweek", after a character in South Park.

== Gene ==
=== Location ===
BLTP1 is found on the long arm of chromosome 4 (4q27), with the genomic sequence starting at 118,818,167 bp and ending at 119,010,362 bp

=== Gene neighborhood ===
The gene neighborhood of BLTP1 involves 4 other genes. BLTP1 is a part of the BLTP1/Tenr/IL2/IL21 gene region. This region consists of the three genes to the right of BLTP1; ADAD1, IL2 and IL21. Another gene located in the neighborhood of BLTP1 is TRPC3. This gene is to the left of BLTP1 on the opposite side of the genes described above.

=== Expression ===
According to data on NCBI's EST Abundance Profile page for BLTP1, the gene is expressed in many different tissues in humans. Human expression is seen most predominately in parathyroid, muscle, ear, eye, mammary gland, lymph node, thymus in addition to 27 other tissues. BLTP1 is also expressed in various disease states including 12 different tumors as well as bladder carcinoma, chondrosarcoma, glioma, leukemia, lymphoma, non-neoplasia, retinoblastoma tissues. BLTP1 is expressed in all stages of development from embryoid body to adult, except in infants. No expression of my gene is seen during the infant stage of development.

=== Promoter ===
According to Genomatix's ElDorado program the promoter region of BLTP1 is predicted to be 601 base pairs in length. The promoter region starts 500 base pairs upstream of the 5' UTR of BLTP1 mRNA transcript and contains part of this 5' UTR.

=== Homology ===
BLTP1 is conserved throughout many species. Orthologs have been found in many mammals and other vertebrates. More distant homologs have been identified in animals such as insects. See the mRNA and protein conservation sections below for more details. No human paralogs for BLTP1 have been identified.

== mRNA ==
=== Splice variants ===
BLTP1 has 13 mRNA splice variants and 6 unspliced variants. Variant A is the longest and most commonly occurring variant of the gene and is the subject of this article. BLTP1 variant A is made up of 84 exons and is 15,592 base pairs in length. The accession number for this nucleotide is NM_015312.3.

=== Conservation ===
The mRNA sequence of BLTP1 is highly conserved throughout mammals. The mRNA sequence identity to mammals is no less than 81.9% (in platypus) and ranging up to 99.5% (in chimpanzees). Birds also show fairly high conservation with mRNA sequence identities around 78% in zebra finches. The table blow shows information on the mRNA orthologs.

Genus and species name	Common name	mRNA accession number	Sequence length (bp)	Sequence identity to human mRNA
Homo sapiens	Human	NM_015312.3	15592	
Pan troglodytes	Chimpanzee	XM_517422.2	15578	99.5%
Macaca mulatta	Rhesus macaque	XM_001102884.2	15529	97.9%
Callithris jacchus	Marmoset	XM_002745433.1	15566	97.2%
Equus caballus	Horse	XM_001915982.1	15589	93.8%
Ailuropoda melanoleuca	Giant panda	XM_002923821.1	15018	91%
Oryctolagus cuniculus	Rabbit	XM_002717235.1	15015	90.7%
Mus musculus	Mouse	NM_172679.2	15883	88.2%
Monodelphis domestica	Opossum	XM_001370569.1	15048	82%
Ornithorhynchus anatinus	Platypus	XM_001513933.1	15039	81.9%
Taeniopygia guttata	Zebra finch	XM_002188249.1	15489	18.9%
Gallus gallus	Chicken	XM_420625.2	15123	78.5%
Tribolium castaneum	Red flour beetle	XM_967081.2	13797	48.6%

== Protein ==
=== General properties ===
BLTP1 protein is 5005 amino acids in length, and has a predicted molecular weight of 555519.38 daltons. The isoelectirc point of BLTP1 protein is predicted to be 6.12.

=== Composition ===
The amino acid composition of BLTP1 protein showed amino acid frequencies within 1.5% of that of normal human proteins for all but Alanine, Serine and Threonine. Alanine has a lower frequency in BLTP1 than in that of a normal human protein while Serine and Threonine both have a higher frequency in BLTP1 than in the average human protein.

=== Conservation ===
The amino acid sequence of BLTP1 is highly conserved throughout mammals. The protein identity ranges from 93.2% in Opossum to 99.8% in Chimpanzees and protein similarity is no less than 97% in all mammals included. Birds continue to show fairly high conservation with protein identities around 90% and proteins similarities at a high 96%. While conservation is still high the lower numbers may be due to small truncations on either, the 5' and 3' ends of these sequences.

As we move to the more distant species of zebra fish and then the red four beetle and carpenter ant the conservations drops. In the insects the protein identities are down to around 34%.

Genus and species name	Common name	Protein accession number	Sequence length (amino acids)	Sequence identity to human protein	Sequence similarity to human protein
Homo sapiens	Human	NP_056127.2	5005		
Pan troglodytes	Chimpanzee	XP_517422.2	5005	99.8%	99.8%
Macaca mulatta	Rhesus macaque	XP_001102884.1	5007	99.2%	99%
Callithris jacchus	Marmoset	XP_002745479.1	5004	98.9%	99%
Equus caballus	Horse	XP_001916017.1	5006	98%	99%
Ailuropoda melanoleuca	Giant panda	XP_002923867.1	5005	98.1%	99%
Oryctolagus cuniculus	Rabbit	XP_002717281.1	5004	97.8%	99%
Mus musculus	Mouse	NP_766267.2	5005	96.7%	99%
Canis familiaris	Dog	XP_540963.2	4944	96.4%	99%
Monodelphis domestica	Opossum	XP_001370606.1	5015	93.2%	97%
Ornithorhynchus anatinus	Platypus	XP_001513983.1	5012	93.3%	97%
Taeniopygia guttata	Zebra finch	XP_002188285.1	4999	90.7%	96%
Gallus gallus	Chicken	XP_420625.2	5040	89.9%	96%
Danio rerio	Zebra fish	NP_001139056.1	4922	74.2%	84%
Tribolium castaneum	Red flour beetle	XP_972174.2	4598	34.8%	49%
Camponotus floridanus	Carpenter ant	EFN75044.1	4979	34.3	

=== Conserved domains ===
NCBI conserved domains search identified two domains in BLTP1. The first is the fragile site associated C-terminus, which is said to be linked to celiac disease susceptibility according to genome-wide-association studies and may also be associated with polycystic kidney disease. The second conserved region identified by NCBI in BLTP1 is an uncharacterized conserved protein (DUF2246), whose function is unknown and is conserved in various species from humans to worms.

=== Post translation modifications ===
BLTP1 is predicted to undergo various types of post translational modifications including glycate, N-glycosylation, O-GlcNAc, O Glycosylation, Sulfonation and Phosphorylation.

=== Subcellular localization ===
BLTP1 contains one transmembrane domain from amino acids 26–46. No signal peptides, mitochondrial targeting sequences or chloroplast peptides were predicted for my protein and it is therefore not predicted to localize to secretory pathway, mitochondria or chloroplast.

=== Interacting proteins ===
MADH2 and Beta-catenin were both found to have a physical interaction with my protein as detached by display technonloy by Miyamoto-Sato et al. 2010.
