= Lactimidomycin =

Chemical compound

Identifiers
- IUPAC name: 4-[(E,2R,5S)-2-hydroxy-5-methyl-7-[(2R,3S,4Z,6E,10E)-3-methyl-12-oxo-1-oxacyclododeca-4,6,10-trien-2-yl]-4-oxooct-6-enyl]piperidine-2,6-dione
- CAS Number: 134869-15-1
- PubChem CID: 11669726
- ChemSpider: 9844457
- ChEMBL: ChEMBL1221911

Chemical and physical data
- Formula: C_{26}H_{35}NO_{6}
- Molar mass: 457.567 g·mol^{−1}
- 3D model (JSmol): Interactive image
- SMILES: N2C(=O)CC(CC2=O)CC(O)CC(=O)C(C)\C=C(/C)\C1OC(=O)C=CCCC=CC=CC1C
- InChI: InChI=1S/C26H35NO6/c1-17-10-8-6-4-5-7-9-11-25(32)33-26(17)19(3)12-18(2)22(29)16-21(28)13-20-14-23(30)27-24(31)15-20/h4,6,8-12,17-18,20-21,26,28H,5,7,13-16H2,1-3H3,(H,27,30,31)/b6-4+,10-8-,11-9+,19-12+/t17-,18-,21+,26+/m0/s1; Key:OYOKHBHOTQDIPM-BRHOHSSQSA-N

Lactimidomycin is a glutarimide antibiotic derived from the bacteria Streptomyces amphibiosporus. It has antifungal, antiviral and anti-cancer properties, acting as a direct inhibitor of protein translation in ribosomes. Antiviral activity is seen against a variety of RNA viruses including flaviviruses such as dengue fever, Kunjin virus and Modoc virus, as well as vesicular stomatitis virus and poliovirus. As lactimidomycin is a natural product containing an unusual unsaturated 12-membered lactone ring, it has been the subject of numerous total synthesis approaches.
