= CHSY1 =

Protein-coding gene in humans

Identifiers
- Aliases: CHSY1, CHSY, CSS1, ChSy-1, TPBS, chondroitin sulfate synthase 1
- External IDs: OMIM: 608183; MGI: 2681120; GeneCards: CHSY1
Enzyme activity
EC #	BRENDA	ExPASy	KEGG	MetaCyc
2.4.1.175	↗	↗	↗	↗
2.4.1.226	↗	↗	↗	↗

Gene location (Human)
Chr.	Chromosome 15 (human)
Band	15q26.3	Start	101,175,727 bp
Band	15q26.3	End	101,252,048 bp

Gene location (Mouse)
Chr.	Chromosome 7 (mouse)
Band	7|7 C	Start	65,759,263 bp
Band	7|7 C	End	65,823,546 bp
RNA expression pattern
Bgee	Human / Mouse (ortholog); Top expressed in: tibia; decidua; visceral pleura; endothelial cell; Epithelium of choroid plexus; vena cava; hair follicle; cartilage tissue; gingival epithelium; synovial joint / Top expressed in: hand; secondary oocyte; Gonadal ridge; primary oocyte; endocardial cushion; semi-lunar valve; renal corpuscle; aortic valve; calvaria; otolith organ; More reference expression data
BioGPS	n/a
Gene ontology
Molecular function	metal ion binding; transferase activity; acetylgalactosaminyltransferase activity; glycosyltransferase activity; N-acetylgalactosaminyl-proteoglycan 3-beta-glucuronosyltransferase activity; glucuronosyl-N-acetylgalactosaminyl-proteoglycan 4-beta-N-acetylgalactosaminyltransferase activity
Cellular component	extracellular region; integral component of membrane; Golgi apparatus; Golgi membrane; Golgi cisterna membrane; membrane
Biological process	proximal/distal pattern formation; bone morphogenesis; cartilage development; chondrocyte development; negative regulation of ossification; sulfation; positive regulation of smoothened signaling pathway; response to nutrient levels; chondroitin sulfate biosynthetic process
Sources:Amigo / QuickGO
Orthologs
Databases	NCBI: entry; OMA: entry
Species	Human	Mouse
Entrez	22856	269941
Ensembl	ENSG00000131873	ENSMUSG00000032640
UniProt	Q86X52	Q6ZQ11
RefSeq (mRNA)	NM_014918	NM_001081163
RefSeq (protein)	NP_055733	NP_001074632
Location (UCSC)	Chr 15: 101.18 – 101.25 Mb	Chr 7: 65.76 – 65.82 Mb
PubMed search
- Wikidata
View/Edit Human	View/Edit Mouse

Chondroitin sulfate synthase 1 is an enzyme that in humans is encoded by the CHSY1 gene.

CHSY1 synthesizes chondroitin sulfate, a glycosaminoglycan expressed on the surface of most cells and in extracellular matrices. Glycosaminoglycan chains are covalently linked to a wide range of core protein families and regulate many biologic processes, including cell proliferation and recognition, extracellular matrix deposition, and morphogenesis.
