= Azelaprag =

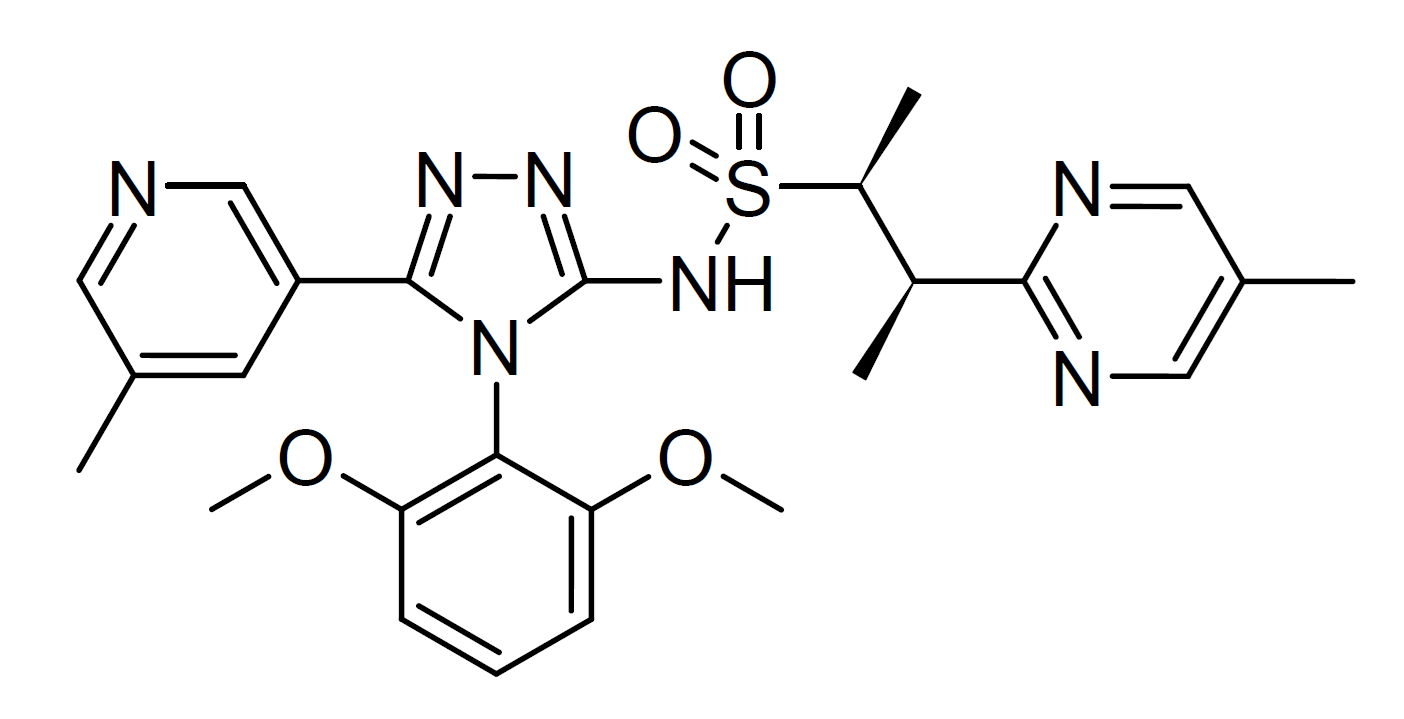

Identifiers
- IUPAC name: (2S,3R)-N-[4-(2,6-dimethoxyphenyl)-5-(5-methyl-3-pyridinyl)-1,2,4-triazol-3-yl]-3-(5-methylpyrimidin-2-yl)butane-2-sulfonamide
- CAS Number: 2049980-18-7
- PubChem CID: 122702529
- UNII: 4B8REJ8ZGY

Chemical and physical data
- Formula: C_{25}H_{29}N_{7}O_{4}S
- Molar mass: 523.61 g·mol^{−1}
- 3D model (JSmol): Interactive image
- SMILES: CC1=CC(=CN=C1)C2=NN=C(N2C3=C(C=CC=C3OC)OC)NS(=O)(=O)[C@@H](C)[C@H](C)C4=NC=C(C=N4)C
- InChI: InChI=1S/C25H29N7O4S/c1-15-10-19(14-26-11-15)24-29-30-25(32(24)22-20(35-5)8-7-9-21(22)36-6)31-37(33,34)18(4)17(3)23-27-12-16(2)13-28-23/h7-14,17-18H,1-6H3,(H,30,31)/t17-,18-/m0/s1; Key:DOMQFIFVDIAOOT-ROUUACIJSA-N

Azelaprag (original Amgen development code AMG 986, subsequently licensed to BioAge Labs and renamed BGE-105) is a drug which is a selective, small-molecule agonist for the apelin receptor. It was originally developed as a potential treatment for heart failure and has subsequently been investigated for other applications such as obesity and muscle wasting in elderly or bed-bound patients.

== See also ==
- AM-8123
- BMS-986224
- CMF-019
