= Al-Raqad syndrome =

- Other names: ARS

Al-Raqad syndrome is a congenital autosomal recessive syndrome discovered by Jordanian physician Mohammad Al-Raqad. It is characterized by:

- Microcephaly
- Growth delay
- Psycho-motor developmental delay
- Congenital hypotonia.

Al-Raqad syndrome is caused by mutation of the DCPS gene.
