= ELMO2 =

Protein-coding gene in the species Homo sapiens

Identifiers
- Aliases: ELMO2, CED-12, CED12, ELMO-2, Ced-12A, engulfment and cell motility 2, VMPI
- External IDs: OMIM: 606421; MGI: 2153045; GeneCards: ELMO2

Gene location (Human)
Chr.	Chromosome 20 (human)
Band	20q13.12	Start	46,366,050 bp
Band	20q13.12	End	46,432,985 bp

Gene location (Mouse)
Chr.	Chromosome 2 (mouse)
Band	2|2 H3	Start	165,129,951 bp
Band	2|2 H3	End	165,168,399 bp
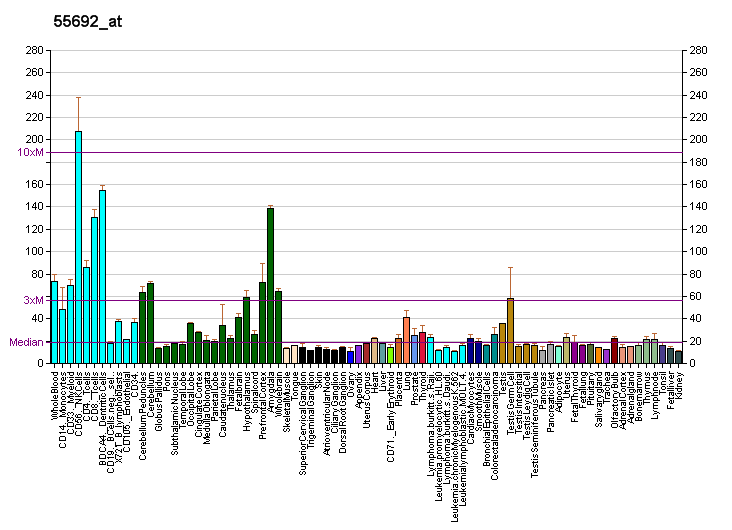

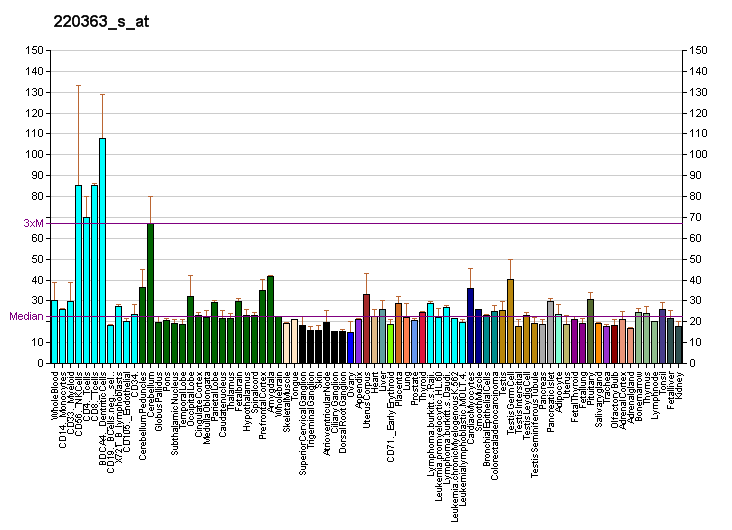

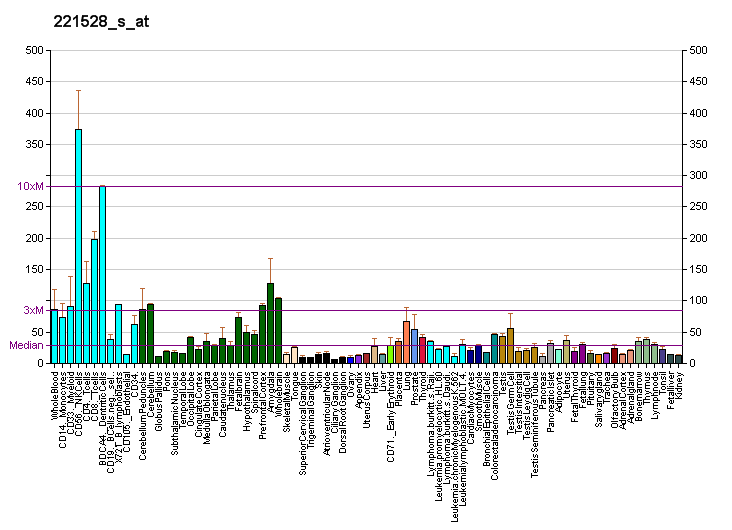
RNA expression pattern
Bgee	Human / Mouse (ortholog); Top expressed in: cerebellar hemisphere; right hemisphere of cerebellum; cerebellar vermis; caudate nucleus; granulocyte; right frontal lobe; nucleus accumbens; putamen; C1 segment; amygdala / Top expressed in: dentate gyrus of hippocampal formation granule cell; visual cortex; primary visual cortex; superior frontal gyrus; cerebellar cortex; lobe of cerebellum; genital tubercle; cerebellar vermis; tail of embryo; piriform cortex; More reference expression data
BioGPS	More reference expression data
Gene ontology
Molecular function	SH3 domain binding; receptor tyrosine kinase binding; protein binding
Cellular component	cytosol; membrane; cytoplasm
Biological process	cell chemotaxis; vascular endothelial growth factor receptor signaling pathway; cell-cell adhesion; cell migration; cytoskeleton organization; Fc-gamma receptor signaling pathway involved in phagocytosis; phagocytosis; apoptotic process
Sources:Amigo / QuickGO
Orthologs
Databases	NCBI: entry; OMA: entry
Species	Human	Mouse
Entrez	63916	140579
Ensembl	ENSG00000062598	ENSMUSG00000017670
UniProt	Q96JJ3; Q5JVZ4	Q8BHL5
RefSeq (mRNA)	NM_022086; NM_133171; NM_182764; NM_001318253	NM_080287; NM_207705; NM_207706; NM_001302752; NM_001302754 NM_207704
RefSeq (protein)	NP_001305182; NP_573403; NP_877496	NP_001289681; NP_001289683; NP_525026; NP_997589
Location (UCSC)	Chr 20: 46.37 – 46.43 Mb	Chr 2: 165.13 – 165.17 Mb
PubMed search
- Wikidata
View/Edit Human	View/Edit Mouse

Engulfment and cell motility protein 2 is a protein that in humans is encoded by the ELMO2 gene.

The protein encoded by this gene interacts with the dedicator of cyto-kinesis 1 protein. Similarity to a C. elegans protein suggests that this protein may function in phagocytosis of apoptotic cells and in cell migration. Alternative splicing results in multiple transcript variants encoding the same protein.
