= Apelin receptor =

Protein-coding gene in the species Homo sapiens

APLNR

Identifiers
- Aliases: APLNR, AGTRL1, APJ, APJR, HG11, apelin receptor
- External IDs: OMIM: 600052; MGI: 1346086; GeneCards: APLNR
Available structures
PDB	Ortholog search: PDBe RCSB
PDB	List of PDB id codes 2LOT, 2LOU, 2LOV, 2LOW

Gene location (Human)
Chr.	Chromosome 11 (human)
Band	11q12.1	Start	57,233,577 bp
Band	11q12.1	End	57,237,250 bp

Gene location (Mouse)
Chr.	Chromosome 2 (mouse)
Band	2|2 D	Start	84,966,569 bp
Band	2|2 D	End	84,970,267 bp
RNA expression pattern
Bgee	Human / Mouse (ortholog); Top expressed in: optic nerve; inferior olivary nucleus; dorsal motor nucleus of vagus nerve; tendon of biceps brachii; ventral tegmental area; spinal cord; C1 segment; Region I of hippocampus proper; myocardium of left ventricle; spleen / Top expressed in: renal corpuscle; left lung lobe; dermis; medullary collecting duct; body of femur; vas deferens; internal carotid artery; primitive streak; digastric muscle; migratory enteric neural crest cell; More reference expression data
BioGPS	n/a
Gene ontology
Molecular function	G protein-coupled receptor activity; signal transducer activity; signaling receptor activity; apelin receptor activity
Cellular component	integral component of membrane; integral component of plasma membrane; membrane; plasma membrane
Biological process	multicellular organism development; development of the heart; regulation of body fluid levels; gastrulation; signal transduction; G protein-coupled receptor signaling pathway; negative regulation of cAMP-mediated signaling; positive regulation of angiogenesis; positive regulation of release of sequestered calcium ion into cytosol; positive regulation of inhibitory G protein-coupled receptor phosphorylation; vasculogenesis; adult heart development; coronary vasculature development; positive regulation of blood vessel endothelial cell proliferation involved in sprouting angiogenesis; angiogenesis; blood vessel development; apelin receptor signaling pathway
Sources:Amigo / QuickGO
Orthologs
Databases	NCBI: entry; OMA: entry
Species	Human	Mouse
Entrez	187	23796
Ensembl	ENSG00000134817	ENSMUSG00000044338
UniProt	P35414	Q9WV08
RefSeq (mRNA)	NM_005161	NM_011784
RefSeq (protein)	NP_005152	NP_035914
Location (UCSC)	Chr 11: 57.23 – 57.24 Mb	Chr 2: 84.97 – 84.97 Mb
PubMed search
- Wikidata
View/Edit Human	View/Edit Mouse

The Apelin Receptor is a G protein-coupled receptor which in humans is encoded by the gene APLNR (and also known as APJ). The structure of APLNR was resolved in 2017.

== Ligands ==
Agonists

APLNR possesses two endogenous agonist ligands:

- APELIN
- ELABELA.

Synthetic agonists include;

- Azelaprag (AMG 986, BGE-105)
- AM-8123
- BMS-986224
- CMF-019

Antagonists

- ML221
