= Branco Weiss =

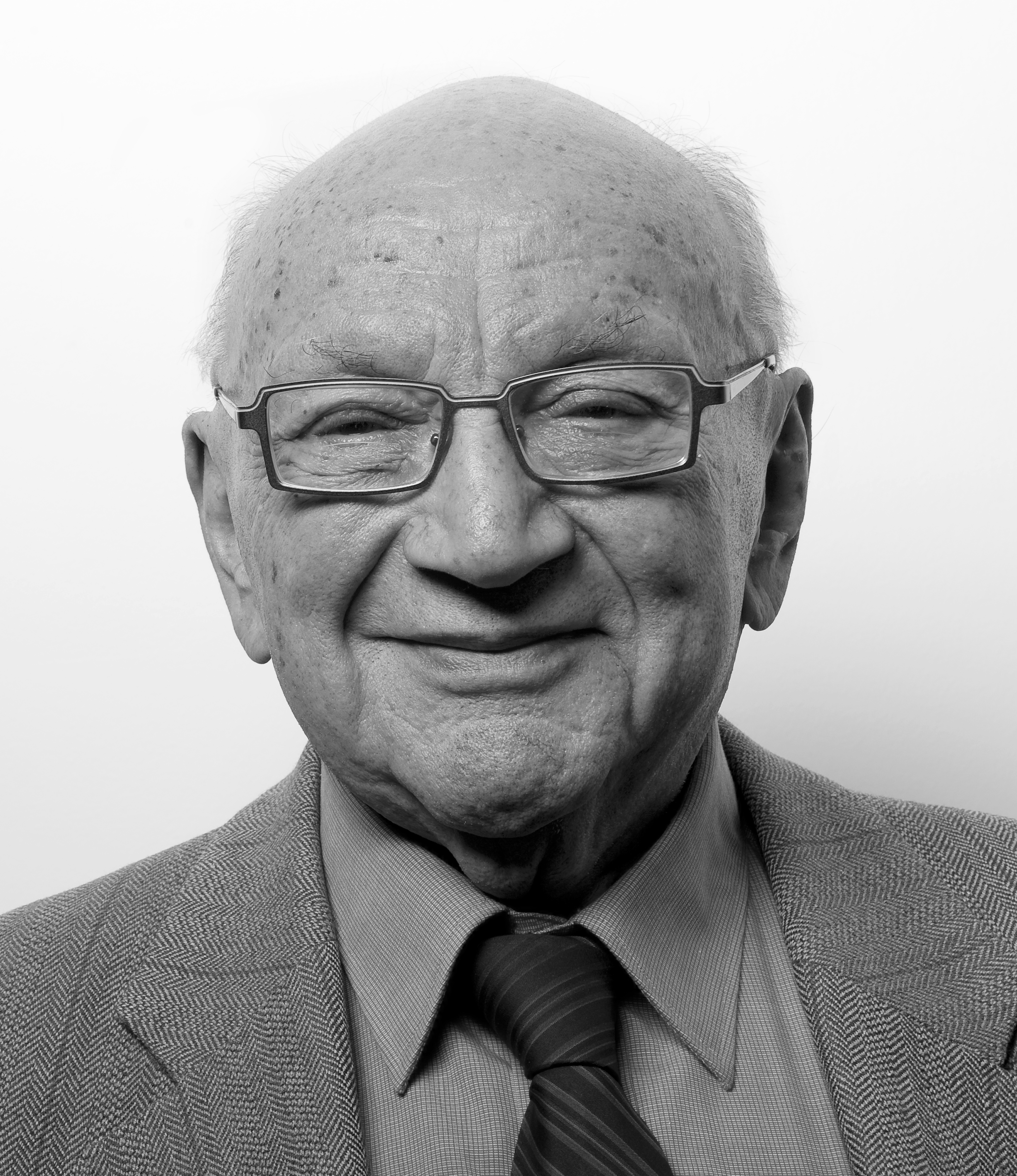
Branco Weiss, 2009

Branco Weiss (23 April 1929 in Zagreb, Yugoslavia – 31 October 2010 in Zurich, Switzerland) was a Swiss entrepreneur and patron.

== Life ==
Weiss was born into a Jewish family from the Austrian province Burgenland which had settled in Croatia. After his father's death at the hand of the fascists in 1943, Weiss fled with his mother to Italy and later to Switzerland. While growing up in a town on the shore of Lake Constance, he studied literature, art and history and developed an interest in natural sciences. He obtained his high-school diploma in Glarisegg in 1947. Subsequently, he enrolled at the Swiss Federal Institute of Technology (ETH) in Zurich and graduated there with a degree in chemical engineering in 1951. During his studies he worked part-time as a lab technician. Weiss wrote a thesis on cost-benefit analysis in the field of filtration.

== Entrepreneurship ==
Weiss has established several national and international high-tech companies. Kontron, a company he founded in 1959, was acquired by Hoffmann-La Roche in 1974. He was also the founder of Esec, a provider of semiconductor components that BE Semiconductor Industries N.V. acquired from OC Oerlikon in 2009. These companies were amongst the pioneers of the computer industry. Weiss was the founder and past president of the Swiss Venture Capital Association.

== Academic life ==
Weiss was a frequent lecturer on innovation and high-tech entrepreneurships. He held lectures at the ETH Zurich from 1985 to 1994 on "Technological Strategies" and on "Management of New Companies". He was a board member and honorary member of the Swiss Academy of Engineering Science, an honorary member of the Swiss Engineers and Architects Society as well as the Alumni Association of ETH.

== Philanthropy ==
Weiss patronized several universities and numerous cultural projects.

In 1987 Weiss together with Swatch founder Nicolas Hayek initiated the Swiss Technology Award.

Jointly with Israel's Ministry of Education, he founded the Branco Weiss Institute in Israel in 1990. The institute consists of 12 schools that promote learning competencies and thinking abilities to students and teachers.

In 2002, Weiss founded Society in Science – The Branco Weiss Fellowship, a fellowship for researchers shortly after their PhD from around the globe. The grant enables postdocs to work on a research topic of their choice for up to five years. In Spring 2010 he handed this organization together with a 20 million Swiss francs endowment over to the ETH. The fellowship's research projects receive broad media coverage. Its fellows work on research projects that affect society, such as the analysis of how diseases spread through communities and how stress affects ageing. In 2009 fellow Riley Crane together with his research team at MIT won the DARPA Network Challenge. The Pentagon Prize was organized by the Defense Advanced Research Projects Agency (DARPA) for developing new ways to understand how information is spread through social networks. According to his research team this technique could be used for finding criminals and missing persons. In his will Branco Weiss left an estimated 100 million Swiss francs to Society in Science – The Branco Weiss Fellowship. In 2017, the fellowship changed its name to The Branco Weiss Fellowship – Society in Science. This research fellowship is designed to support postdoctoral researchers after their PhD and before their first faculty appointment. Those in current postdoctoral positions are also eligible. Ideally, fellows pursue unconventional projects in new areas of science, engineering and social sciences.

Weiss also donated 23 million Swiss francs in 2004 to the ETH's "Science City" – an infrastructure project that helps transform the additional ETH campus built in the outskirts of Zurich into an attractive district. In 2008 the Branco Weiss Information Science Laboratory was opened in Science City.

Weiss made one of the largest donations to Central European University (CEU) and also was a member of the team that developed the strategic plan of the University, which was applied in 2003. In 2004 he helped with the initial accreditation of the CEU by the Middle States Commission on Higher Education. The CEU is ranked 22nd on the European Top Business Schools 2010 report.

== Honors ==
- 2005 honorary doctorate University of Basel
- 1998 honorary doctorate University of EPFL (École Polytechnique Fédérale de Lausanne)
- 1998 honorary doctorate Federal Institute of Technology (ETH) Zurich
- 1993 honorary doctorate University of Tel Aviv

== Memberships ==
- Swiss Academy of Engineering Sciences: fellow, board member
- Swiss Engineers and Architects Society: honorary member
- Alumni Association of ETH: honorary member

== Publications ==
- Branco Weiss (Eds.): Praxis des Venture Capital (Practice of Venture Capital). Verlag Moderne Industrie, Zurich 1991, ISBN 3-478-31610-3
- Branco Weiss: Entrepreneurship. Ramot Publishing, Tel Aviv University, Tel Aviv 1994, ISBN 965-274-160-4

== Literature ==
- Richard Morais: Swiss Risk – How Branco Weiss is shaking up the cautious Swiss. In: Forbes magazine. Vol. 139, Issues 10–14, Forbes, New York, NY 1987, S. 49 ff, ISSN 0015-6914
