= FBX-101 =

Experimental gene therapy

FBX-101 is an experimental gene therapy delivered via adeno-associated virus rh10 vector to the GALC gene. It is developed by Forge Biologics to treat Krabbe disease.
