= Paola Leone =

Italian biologist

Paola Leone is an Italian researcher of Canavan disease, a leukodystrophy.

Leone was born and raised in Cagliari, Italy. She received her undergraduate and graduate training in Italy, followed by post-doctoral studies in Montreal and Yale University in New Haven, CT. She holds a doctorate degree in Neuroscience from the University of Padua. Her work on Canavan disease started at Yale, where she collaborated with other early pioneers in gene therapy. She left Yale in 1998 to join the (now defunct) Cell & Gene Therapy Center at Thomas Jefferson University in Philadelphia. She directs The Cell & Gene Therapy Center at the University of Medicine and Dentistry of New Jersey.

Recently, she has been funded by NIH-NINDS and Jacob's Cure to study the potential of subpopulations of stem cells to promote remyelination and phenotypic rescue in animal models of white matter disease, including the Canavan mouse model. She is generating pre-clinical data using human Embryonic-Derived-Oligodendrocyte Stem Cells provided by Geron Corporation (CA). These studies will provide a foundation for a targeted and comprehensive analysis of the potential of a cell-based therapy for Canavan Disease.
