= Galactosylceramide =

Class of chemical compounds

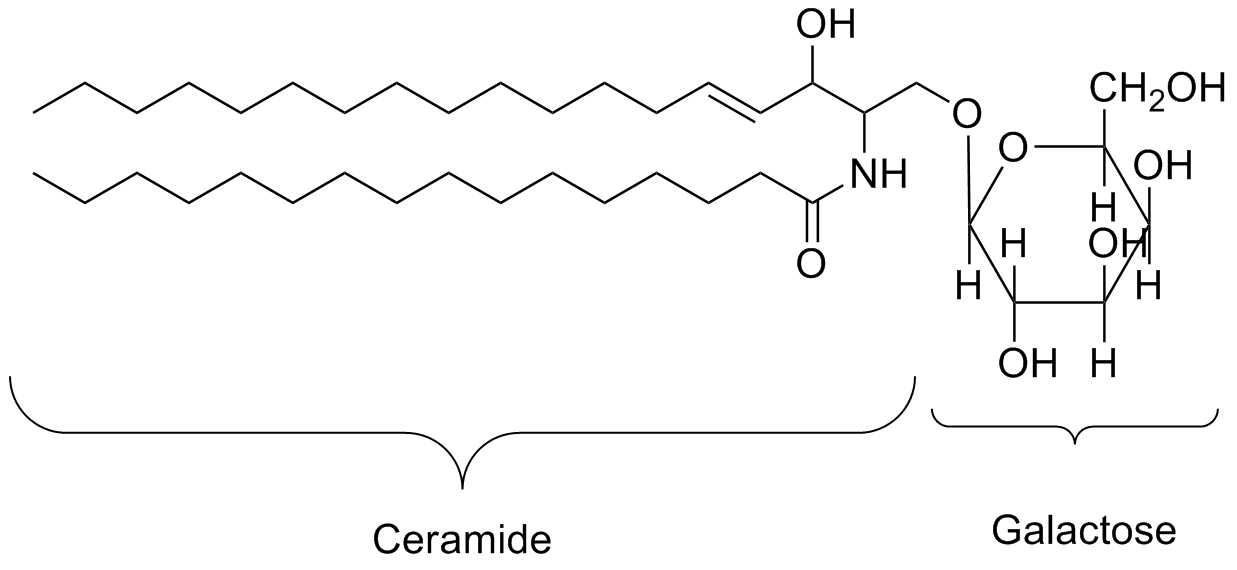
A galactosylceramide

A galactosylceramide, or galactocerebroside is a type of cerebroside consisting of a ceramide with a galactose residue at the 1-hydroxyl moiety.

The galactose is cleaved by galactosylceramidase.

Galactosylceramide is a marker for oligodendrocytes in the brain, whether or not they form myelin.

α-Galactosylceramides are immunomodulatory and prevents or reduces autoimmune disorders such as Type 1 diabetes, multiple sclerosis, rheumatoid arthritis, systemic lupus erythematosus, bowel disease. Studies have found α-Galactosylceramides in the large intestines, produced by Bacteriodes, which activate iNKT cells via a CD1 dependent mechanism and plays a role in immune regulation.

Additional images

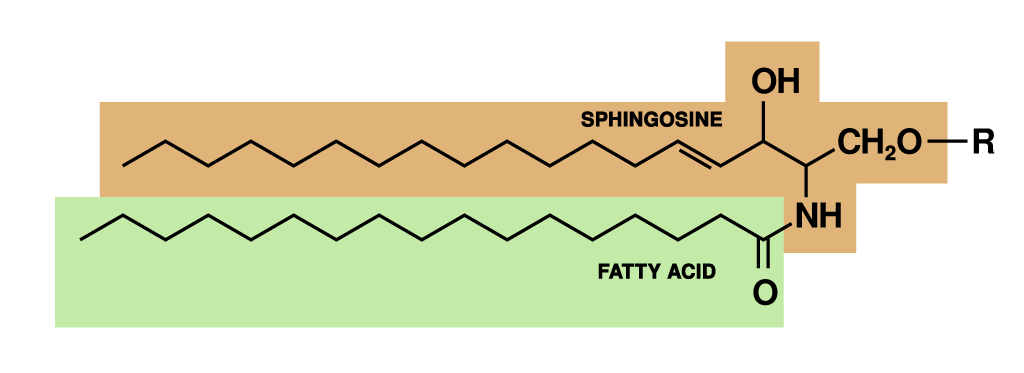
Sphingolipid

== See also ==
- Alpha-Galactosylceramide
- Krabbe disease
- Myelin
