= The Stennis Foundation =

U.S. nonprofit organization

The Stennis Foundation is a registered nonprofit organization based in the U.S. The foundation is primarily a fundraising organization, sending money to various research projects. Currently, the Stennis Foundation supports research at Duke, Kennedy Krieger, and San Raffaele Institute in Milan, Italy.

According to their website, the Stennis Foundation is committed to raising public awareness regarding the leukodystrophies, and funds for related research. Their goal is to advance research through proper funding. Their mission statement is, "One Step Closer to a Cure."

The foundation's beginnings were inspired by Dr. Sam Stennis, a former optometrist in Amarillo, Texas, who, at age 47, was diagnosed with adult-onset metachromatic leukodystrophy.

== Conditions of interest ==
- Leukodystrophy
- Metachromatic leukodystrophy
- Adrenoleukodystrophy
- Krabbe disease
- Alexander disease
- Canavan disease
- Pelizaeus–Merzbacher disease
