= Maria Luisa Escolar =

Pediatrician, clinical professor

Maria Luisa Escolar is a pediatrician, clinical professor, and researcher who specializes in pediatric neurodevelopmental disabilities. She is Founder and Director of the Program for the Study of Neurodevelopment in Rare Disorders at Children's Hospital of Pittsburgh of the University of Pittsburgh Medical Center. Escolar is nationally and internationally known for her research and clinical care of children with leukodystrophies, lysosomal storage diseases, and other inherited metabolic diseases.

== Biography ==
Maria Luisa Escolar earned a medical degree at Escuela Colombiana de Medicina in Bogotá, Colombia in 1986; Master of Science in Human Nutrition at Columbia University College of Physicians and Surgeons, New York, NY in 1988; and continued her training in Child Development and Behavioral Pediatrics at New York Hospital–Cornell Medical Center.

In 2000 Escolar established the Early Childhood Clinic at the Clinical Center for the Study of Development and Learning at the University of North Carolina at Chapel Hill to provide comprehensive care for children affected by Krabbe disease and other lysosomal storage disorders. This program became the Neurodevelopmental Function in Rare Disorders and gradually expanded to include other rare neurodegenerative disorders. In 2011, the program moved to the Children's Hospital of Pittsburgh of the University of Pittsburgh Medical Center and was renamed the Program for the Study of Neurodevelopment in Rare Disorders.

Escolar's work as a pediatrician specializing in rare neurodevelopmental diseases has become well known through word of mouth and media. Escolar has developed multidisciplinary approaches to diagnose these diseases and assess disease progression and treatment outcomes. She has contributed to articles on the management of mucopolysaccharidosis type II (Hunter syndrome) and assessment of neurodevelopment in lysosomal storage diseases and related disorders using standardized and validated tools.

== NDRD clinic ==
As a clinical associate in pediatrics at Duke University Medical Center, Escolar saw her first patient with Krabbe disease while evaluating outcomes of umbilical cord blood transplantation in children with lysosomal storage disorders. Successful management of disease symptoms in this patient led to referrals of other children with lysosomal storage disorders and to the awareness that few physicians had sufficient knowledge to care for these children. To provide more comprehensive care at earlier disease stages and collect data for natural history studies, she established the Early Childhood Clinic at the Clinical Center for Development and Learning at the Carolina Institute for Developmental Disabilities, University of North Carolina–Chapel Hill, which evolved into the Program for Neurodevelopmental Function in Rare Disorders (NFRD).

In 2011, Escolar joined the Children's Hospital of Pittsburgh of the University of Pittsburgh Medical Center, and the program was renamed the Program for the Study of Neurodevelopment in Rare Disorders (NDRD). The NDRD provides clinical services, conducts research, and trains clinicians, researchers, and students. Escolar has particular expertise in Krabbe disease but also sees patients with other neurodegenerative diseases including metachromatic leukodystrophy, adrenoleukodystrophy, and mucopolysaccharidosis disorders.

Clinic visits typically include assessments by a neurodevelopmental pediatrician, neurologist, ophthalmologist, audiologist, physical therapist, and nurse practitioner, who provide recommendations for symptom management, schooling, therapies, and palliative care. As of May 2015, the program was following more than 700 patients from 40 US states and 20 countries. Escolar also consults with families of affected children who are unable to travel to the clinic and with their doctors through the NDRD Virtual Medical Home.

== Rare disease research ==
Escolar's research focuses on describing the natural history of rare neurodegenerative conditions and developing qualitative and quantitative methods to assess treatment outcomes and monitor disease progression. She has also contributed to the characterization of neurophysiologic abnormalities in mucopolysaccharidosis type III (Sanfilippo syndrome) and development of a potential biochemical biomarker that may aid in newborn screening for Krabbe disease. In 2010 Escolar created the Krabbe Translational Research Network, a consortium of clinicians and researchers who are working together on specific projects to improve treatments for Krabbe disease

=== Treatment outcomes ===
While assessing treatment outcomes of children undergoing umbilical cord blood transplantation at Duke University Hospital, Escolar hypothesized that treatment of children with Krabbe disease would be more effective if performed earlier in the disease process. To test that hypothesis, Escolar and colleagues compared treatment outcomes of patients with infantile Krabbe disease identified through family history who were symptomatic or asymptomatic at the time of treatment. In the short term, umbilical cord blood transplantation improved neurodevelopmental function and survival. A follow-up study reported that most of the children treated while still asymptomatic had normal cognitive function, vision, and hearing 10 years after transplantation but experienced varying degrees of motor disability, growth failure, and speech difficulties.

Escolar has also studied treatment outcomes in other neurodegenerative diseases and has recommended specific standardized assessment instruments to evaluate outcomes in children with Hurler syndrome. Escolar and colleagues report that early treatment with umbilical cord blood transplantation can improve somatic impairment, cognitive function, and motor skills in children with mucopolysaccharidosis type I (Hurler syndrome); adaptive behavior and cognitive, language, and motor skills in boys with adrenoleukodystrophy; and hearing, neurodevelopment, and skeletal abnormalities in children with alpha-mannosidosis.

=== Natural history studies ===
After beginning to provide clinical services for children with rare neurodegenerative diseases, Escolar realized the need for natural history studies. Systematic collection of clinical data has resulted in a database of information on more 700 patients. These studies are used to better understand disease progression, distinguish among disease subtypes, improve diagnostic tests, define endpoints for clinical trials, and evaluate response to treatment. She has published or contributed to natural history studies on Sanfilippo syndrome type A and studies evaluating transplantation outcomes for patients with Hurler syndrome and metachromatic leukodystrophy.

=== Clinical tools for detecting neurodegenerative disease ===
Escolar has worked with other clinicians to identify tools that could help decrease the time to diagnosis and identify patients with early-onset forms of these diseases that require urgent treatment decisions. With Dr. Stephanie Wolfe, a child neurology specialist at the University of North Carolina, Escolar developed the Protocol for the Assessment of Neurodevelopmental Function in Early Infancy (PANDI) to detect developmental delays at an early age, predict future neurodevelopment, and give parents the information they need to provide their children with early interventions. With Dr. Michele Poe, Escolar and the NFRD staff developed a staging system to help physicians determine whether a patient with Krabbe disease was a good candidate for transplantation. The patient's pretransplant stage, based on clinical signs and symptoms, is used to predict neurodevelopmental outcomes after treatment.

To assess neurodevelopmental changes in children with lysosomal storage diseases and related disorders, Escolar and the NDRD staff developed a multidisciplinary approach using a combination of standardized and validated tests. These tests can be used for the longitudinal tracking of development (speech/language, cognition, and fine and gross motor development, and adaptive behavior) and take into account limitations caused by neurological, sensory and somatic problems. To identify which patients with mucopolysaccharidosis type II (Hunter syndrome) have the severe neurodegenerative form of the disease, Escolar's group developed a severity score index based on clinical markers of neurologic disease as a screening tool.

=== Neuroimaging tools for diagnosis and evaluation of disease progression ===
Because clinical evaluations of children at risk for Krabbe disease are not easily reproducible, Escolar has collaborated with neuroradiologists to develop better tools to diagnose this and other neurodegenerative diseases and to evaluate disease progression, effects of treatment on different brain regions, and the development and timing of myelination.

Escolar and collaborators have reported that diffusion tensor imaging tractography with white matter volumetric analysis can detect white matter changes in the early stages of infantile Krabbe disease before symptoms are apparent. A subsequent study showed that reductions in fractional anisotropy in the corticospinal tract can predict response to treatment and long-term neurodevelopment (longitudinal changes in cognitive function, motor skills, and adaptive behavior).

In 2015, Escolar and colleagues developed a simple scoring system of midbrain morphology, as determined by magnetic resonance imaging, to assess disease severity in infantile Krabbe disease. Their research showed that flat or concave morphology of the midbrain correlates with poorer cognitive and gross motor function.

== NDRD training program ==
Because few physicians specialize in rare neurodevelopmental disorders, Escolar has developed a training program for students, physicians, and other specialists including those in the fields of psychology, speech/language pathology, audiology, physical therapy, occupational therapy, nutrition, education, social work, biostatistics, and nursing. In addition, she serves as a consultant to establish similar clinics in other countries.
