= Acylase =

Acylase may refer to:

- Amidase, an enzyme
- Aminoacylase, an enzyme
