= APEH =

APEH or Apeh may refer to:

- APEH (gene)
- AP European History, US high school course
- Adó- és Pénzügyi Ellenőrző Hivatal (Tax and Financial Control Administration), the Hungarian pre-2010 Revenue service

== People with the name ==
- Emmanuel Apeh (born 1996), Nigerian footballer
