= Rosenthal fiber =

Sign of a few neurodegenerative disorders

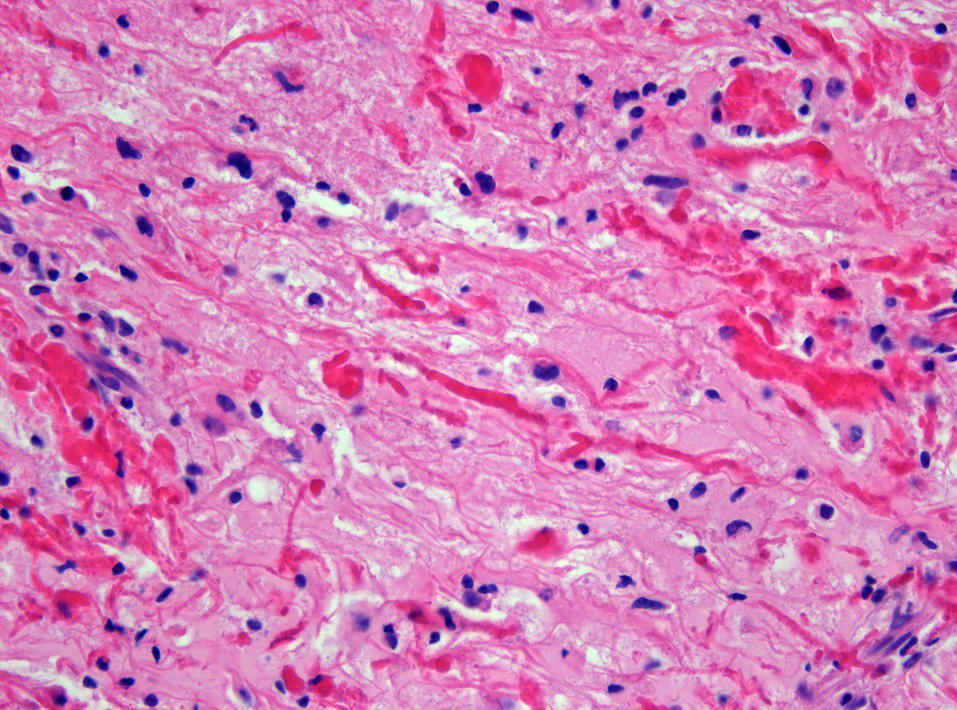
Rosenthal fibers. H&E staining showing these elongated eosinophilic structures in a case of pilocytic astrocytoma. (Magnification 400x)

Rosenthal fibers are brightly eosinophilic, corkscrew-shaped astrocytic inclusions composed primarily of glial fibrillary acidic protein (GFAP) with small heat-shock proteins.

== Associated conditions ==
Rosenthal fibers are found on staining of brain tissue in the presence of long-standing reactive gliosis (e.g., old infarcts, multiple sclerosis, trauma), some tumors (e.g., pilocytic astrocytoma), and rarely in lysosomal storage diseases such as fucosidosis. They may be seen in Alexander disease.

Rosenthal fibers can also be seen in craniopharyngioma.

== Composition ==
The fibers are found in astrocytic processes and are thought to be clumped intermediate filament proteins, primarily glial fibrillary acidic protein. Other reported constituents include alphaB crystallin, heat shock protein 27, ubiquitin, vimentin, plectin, c-Jun, the 20 S proteasome, and synemin.
