= Friedrich Christoph Pelizaeus =

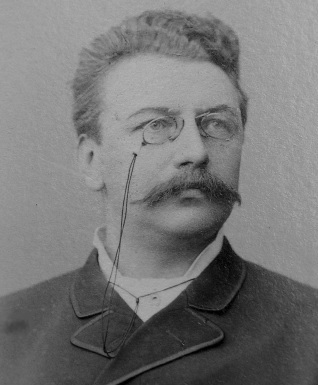
Friedrich Christoph Pelizaeus

Friedrich Christoph Pelizaeus (3 April 1851 – 11 August 1942) was a German balneologist and neurologist who was a native of Rietberg.

In 1874 he earned his medical doctorate from the University of Würzburg, and afterwards served as an assistant to Karl Friedrich Ferdinand Runge (1835-1882) at the resort in Nassau an der Lahn. Later he worked as a balneologist at Ilmenau, Kreischa and Bad Oeynhausen. In 1896 he received the title of Sanitätsrat (health advisor). Pelizaeus died in Kassel on 11 August 1942.

In 1885 he provided the first description of a dysmyelinating central nervous system disorder that was to become known as "Pelizaeus–Merzbacher disease", named in conjunction with neuropathologist Ludwig Merzbacher (1875–1942).
