= Fern Kupfer =

American writer (born 1946)

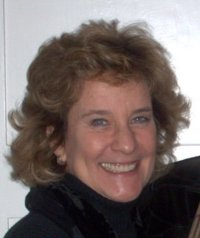
Fern Kupfer

Fern Lee Kupfer is an American author and retired professor of creative writing at Iowa State University. She has written several novels and as well as memoirs reflecting on her life experiences, the discovery that she is a carrier of the BRCA gene, and the loss of her son to Canavan disease.

== Life and career ==
Kupfer was born in 1946 and grew up in Plainview, Long Island. In 1968 she received her BA from State University of New York at Cortland. She moved to Iowa with her first husband in the early 1970s after having been a high school English teacher and working at a day care center in Rochester, New York. She received her master's degree in English from Iowa State University in 1975, with a thesis on the concept of androgyny in the novels of D. H. Lawrence and later taught creative writing at the university for many years.

She has written several novels and two memoirs as well as contributing regular columns to the Ames Tribune and Newsday. Her first book, Before and After Zachariah, originally published by Delacorte Press in 1982, is a reflection on her family's decision to institutionalize her severely handicapped son. The experience made her an advocate for parents who choose institutionalized care for children with severe disabilities. The book has had 5 editions published between 1982 and 1998 and has also been published in French as Avant et après Zacharie. Her most recent memoir, Leaving Long Island and other departures, published in 2012, includes her experiences of divorce, the discovery that she carries the BRCA gene, and raising a blended family.

== Personal life ==
Kupfer's first marriage to Joseph Kupfer, a philosophy scholar whom she married in Williamsville, New York in the late 1960s, ended in divorce. They had two children, a daughter, Gabi and their late son, Zachariah. She is now married to Joseph Geha, a Lebanese-American academic and author of the novel, Lebanese Blonde. The couple live in Ames, Iowa.

== Bibliography ==
- Kupfer, Fern. Strong Women in Chicago. Madison, Wisconsin: Culicidae Press (2025). ISBN 978-1683151159
- Kupfer, Fern. Leaving Long Island and other departures. Ames, Iowa: Culicidae Press (2012). ISBN 1479219274
- Kupfer, Fern. "Another Traditional Arab Jewish Potluck" in The Secret Lives of Lawfully Wedded Wives: 27 Women Writers on Love, Infidelity, Sex Roles, Race, Kids, and More. Ed. Autumn Stephens. Novato, CA: New World Library (2006). ISBN 193072263X
- Kupfer, Fern. "Trust" in Mirror, Mirror on the Wall: Women Writers Explore Their Favorite Fairy Tales.Ed. Kate Bernheimer. New York, NY: Anchor (1998). ISBN 0385486812
- Kupfer, Fern. ""Sleepwalking Through Suburbia" in Nice Jewish Girls. Ed. Marlene Adler Marks. New York, NY: Plume (1996). ISBN 0452273978
- Kupfer, Fern. Love Lies. New York: Simon & Schuster (1994). ISBN 0821751557
- Kupfer, Fern. No Regrets. New York: Viking Press (1989). ISBN 0450553418
- Kupfer, Fern. Surviving the Seasons. New York: Delacorte Press (1987). ISBN 044050189X
- Kupfer, Fern. Before and After Zachariah. New York: Delacorte Press (1982). ISBN 0897333039
