= Aminoacylase 1 deficiency =

- Other names: Neurological conditions associated with aminoacylase 1 deficiency
- Aminoacylase 1 deficiency is inherited in an autosomal recessive manner

Aminoacylase 1 deficiency is a rare inborn error of metabolism. To date only 21 cases have been described.

== Signs and symptoms ==
The clinical picture is heterogeneous and includes motor delay, seizures, moderate to severe mental retardation, absent speech, growth delay, muscular hypotonia and autistic features.

== Genetics ==
This disorder in inherited in an autosomal recessive fashion.

== Molecular biology ==
Aminoacylase 1 (ACY1: EC 3.5.14) is a zinc binding enzyme which hydrolyzes N-acetyl amino acids into the free amino acid and acetic acid. Of the N-acetyl amino hydrolyzing enzymes, aminoacylase 1 is the most common.

The ACY1 gene is located on the short arm of chromosome 3 (3p21.2).

== Diagnosis ==
There is a specific pattern of N-acetyl amino acid excretion in the urine. The diagnosis can be confirmed by sequencing of the aminoacylase 1 gene.

== History ==
This disorder was first reported in 2005.
