= Pelizaeus–Merzbacher disease =

X-linked leukodystrophy

- Other names: Cockayne-Pelizaeus-Merzbacher disease, Hypomyelinating leukodystrophy 1 (HLD 1), Sudanophilic leukodystrophy.
- Pelizaeus–Merzbacher disease is inherited in an x-linked recessive manner
- Specialty: Neurology

Pelizaeus–Merzbacher disease is an X-linked neurological disorder that damages oligodendrocytes in the central nervous system. It is caused by mutations in proteolipid protein 1 (PLP1), a major myelin protein. It is characterized by a decrease in the amount of insulating myelin surrounding the nerves (hypomyelination) and belongs to a group of genetic diseases referred to as leukodystrophies.

== Signs and symptoms ==
The hallmark signs and symptoms of Pelizaeus–Merzbacher disease include little or no movement in the arms or legs, respiratory difficulties, and characteristic horizontal movements of the eyes left to right.

The onset of Pelizaeus–Merzbacher disease is usually in early infancy. The most characteristic early signs are nystagmus (rapid, involuntary, rhythmic motion of the eyes) and low muscle tone. Motor abilities are delayed or never acquired, mostly depending upon the severity of the mutation. Most children with Pelizaeus–Merzbacher disease learn to understand language, and usually have some speech. Other signs may include tremor, lack of coordination, involuntary movements, weakness, unsteady gait, and over time, spasticity in legs and arms. Muscle contractures often occur over time. Mental functions may deteriorate. Some patients may have convulsions and skeletal deformation, such as scoliosis, resulting from abnormal muscular stress on bones.

== Cause ==
Pelizaeus–Merzbacher disease is caused by X-linked recessive mutations in the major myelin protein proteolipid protein 1 (PLP1). This causes hypomyelination in the central nervous system and severe neurological disease. The majority of mutations result in duplications of the entire PLP1 gene. Deletions of PLP1 locus (which are rare) cause a milder form of Pelizaeus–Merzbacher disease than is observed with the typical duplication mutations, which demonstrates the critical importance of gene dosage at this locus for normal CNS function.

== Diagnosis ==
The diagnosis of Pelizaeus–Merzbacher disease is often first suggested after identification by magnetic resonance imaging of abnormal white matter (high T2 signal intensity, i.e. T2 lengthening) throughout the brain, which is typically evident by about 1 year of age, but more subtle abnormalities should be evident during infancy. Unless a family history consistent with sex-linked inheritance exists, the condition is often misdiagnosed as cerebral palsy. Once a PLP1 mutation is identified, prenatal diagnosis or preimplantation genetic diagnostic testing is possible.

=== Classification ===
The disease is one in a group of genetic disorders collectively known as leukodystrophies that affect the growth of the myelin sheath, the fatty covering—which acts as an insulator—on nerve fibers in the central nervous system. The several forms of Pelizaeus–Merzbacher disease include classic, congenital, transitional, and adult variants. Pelizaeus–Merzbacher disease is the common name for hypomyelinating leukodystrophies (HLD). There are at least 26 HLD variants cataloged by the National Institutes of Health National Library of Medicine and the Online Mendelian Inheritance in Man (OMIM) compendium of human genes and genetic phenotypes.

Milder mutations of the PLP1 gene that mainly cause leg weakness and spasticity, with little or no cerebral involvement, are classified as spastic paraplegia 2 (SPG2).

== Treatment ==
No cure for Pelizaeus–Merzbacher disease has been developed. Outcomes are variable: people with the most severe form of the disease do not usually survive to adolescence, although with milder forms, survival into adulthood is possible.

Ionis Pharmaceuticals is currently testing ION356, an antisense oligonucleotide targeted against PLP1, in a Phase 1b trial in PMD patients.

== Research ==
In December 2008, StemCells, Inc received clearance in the United States to conduct a phase I clinical trials of human neural stem cell transplantation. The trial did not show meaningful efficacy and the company has since gone bankrupt.

In 2019 Paul Tesar, a professor at Case Western Reserve University, used CRISPR and antisense therapy in a mouse model of Pelizaeus–Merzbacher with success. In 2022 Case Western Reserve University entered an exclusive licensing agreement with Ionis Pharmaceuticals to develop a human treatment for the disorder.

== See also ==
- The Myelin Project
- The Stennis Foundation
- Friedrich Christoph Pelizaeus
- Ludwig Merzbacher
