= Pilocytic astrocytoma =

Benign brain tumor originating in astrocyte cells

- Other names: Juvenile pilocytic astrocytoma or Cystic cerebellar astrocytoma
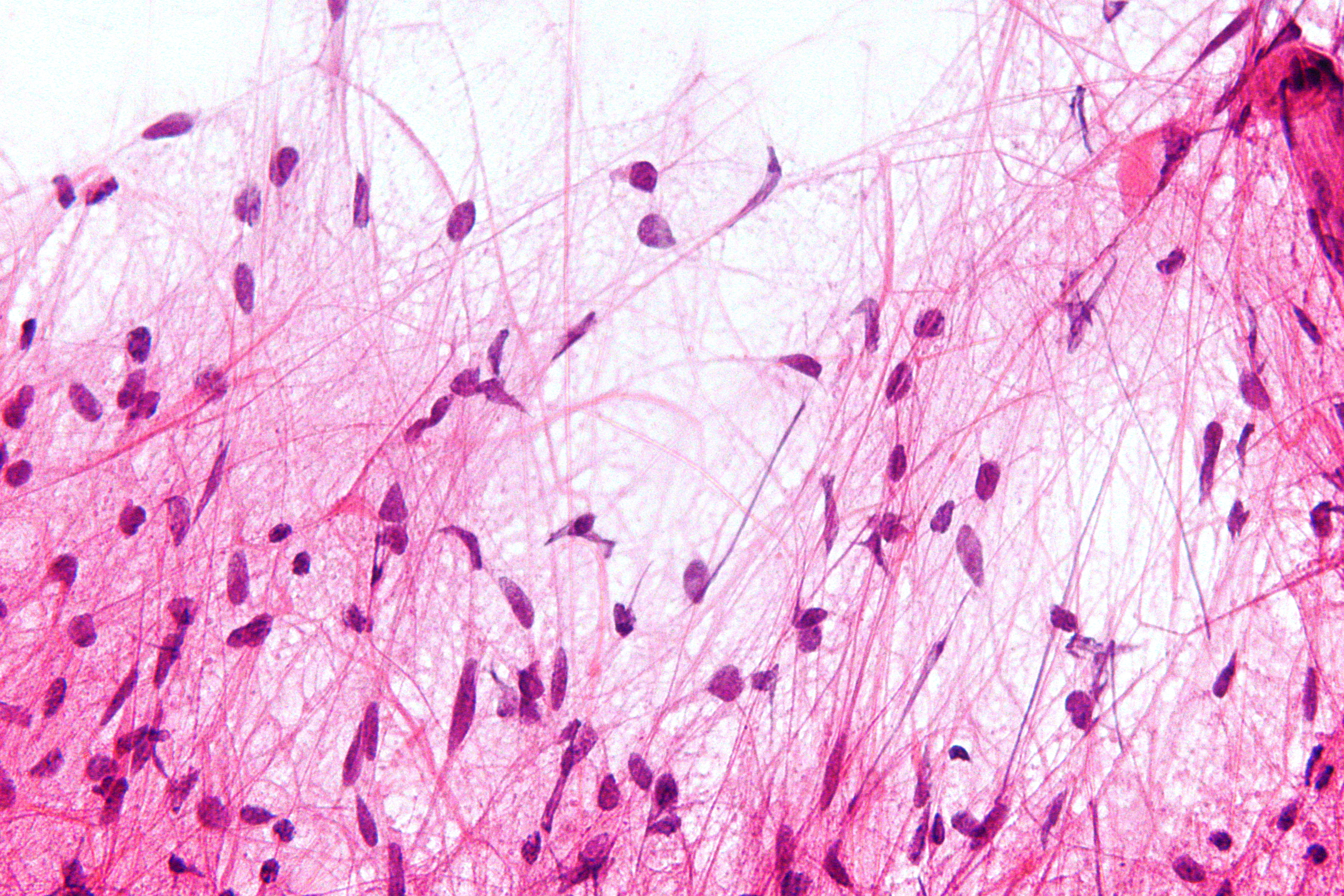
- Micrograph of a pilocytic astrocytoma, showing characteristic bipolar cells with long pilocytic (hair-like) processes. Smear preparation. H&E stain.
- Specialty: Neuro-oncology, neurosurgery
- Symptoms: lack of appropriate weight gain/ weight loss headaches nausea vomiting irritability torticollis difficulty to coordinate movements
- Usual onset: First 20 years of life
- Diagnostic method: MRI, CT scan

Pilocytic astrocytoma (and its variant pilomyxoid astrocytoma) is a brain tumor that occurs most commonly in children and young adults (in the first 20 years of life). They usually arise in the cerebellum, near the brainstem, in the hypothalamic region, or the optic chiasm, but they may occur in any area where astrocytes are present, including the cerebral hemispheres and the spinal cord. These tumors are usually slow growing and benign, corresponding to WHO malignancy grade 1.

== Signs and symptoms ==
Stereotactic MRI brain scan showing a recurrent postoperative brain stem cystic pilocytic astrocytoma.

Children affected by pilocytic astrocytoma can present with different symptoms that might include failure to thrive (lack of appropriate weight gain/ weight loss), headache, nausea, vomiting, irritability, torticollis (tilt neck or wry neck), difficulty to coordinate movements, and visual complaints (including nystagmus). The complaints may vary depending on the location and size of the neoplasm. The most common symptoms are associated with increased intracranial pressure due to the size of the tumor mass.

== Causes ==
Pilocytic astrocytoma can be associated with the genetic condition neurofibromatosis type 1 (NF1), and optic nerve gliomas are among the most frequently encountered tumors in patients with this disorder. The majority of pilocytic astrocytomas, however, arise sporadically – with no evidence of a link to an underlying hereditary predisposition or lifestyle factor. They are associated with genetic alterations in the MAPK/ERK pathway, most frequently a characteristic KIAA1549–BRAF fusion gene.

== Diagnosis ==
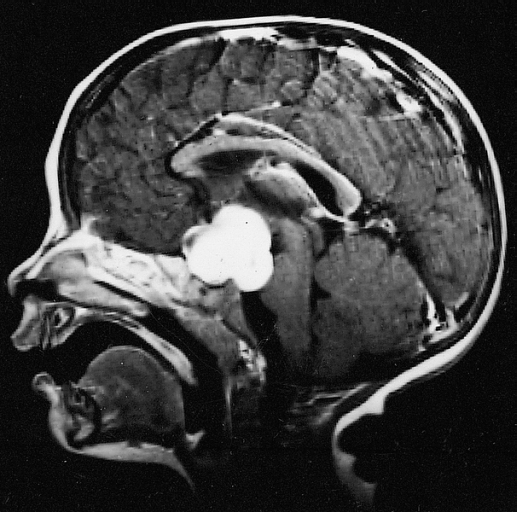
Pilocytic astrocytoma in the hypothalamic region

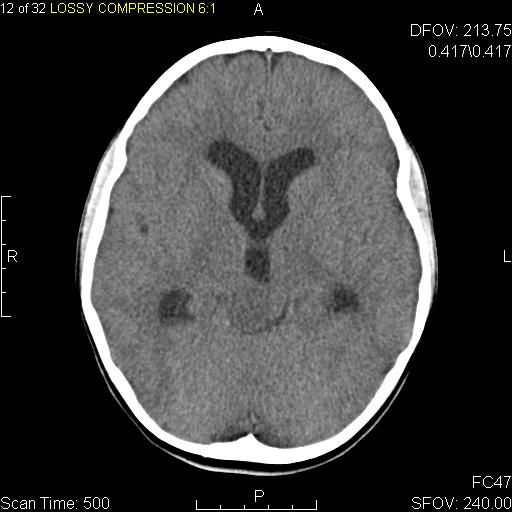
Axial non-contrast CT in a nine-year-old girl showing a slightly hypodense mass in the tectum of the brainstem, compressing the aqueduct of Sylvius and causing obstructive hydrocephalus

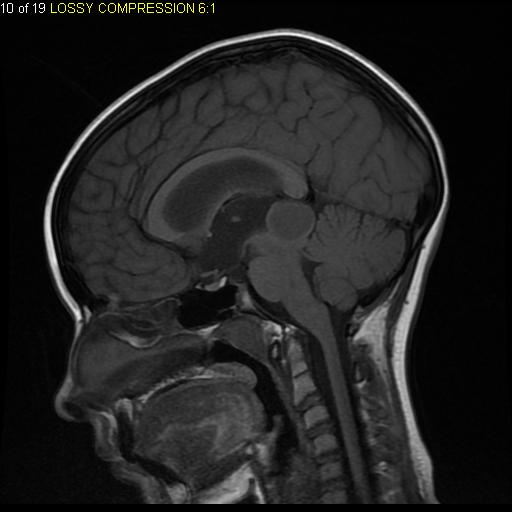
Sagittal T1-weighted MRI showing a well-circumscribed hypointense mass in the tectum (presumably a tectal plate glioma). These lesions are a distinct subset of pilocytic astrocytoma which present with hydrocephalus typically in 6 to 10 year-olds and are rarely progressive lesions. When imaging is characteristic, a biopsy is usually not performed because of the risks to adjacent structures, often shunting to relieve intracranial pressure is the only treatment required.

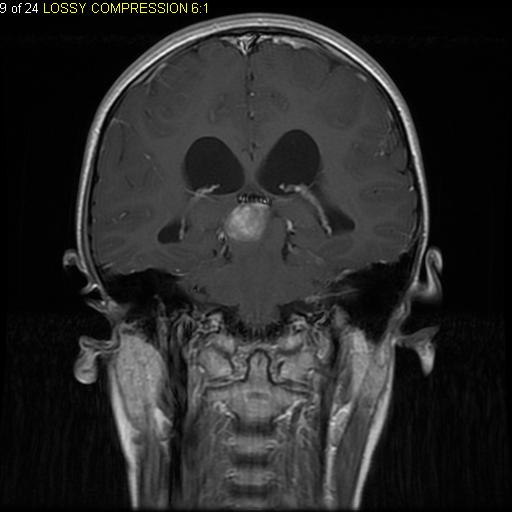
T1-weighted coronal MRI image postcontrast showing heterogeneous contrast enhancement within the presumed tectal plate glioma

Usually – depending on the interview of the patient and after a clinical exam which includes a neurological exam and an ophthalmological exam – a CT scan and/or an MRI scan will be performed to confirm the presence of a tumor. They are usually easily distinguishable from normal brain structures using these imaging techniques. A special dye may be injected into a vein before these scans to provide contrast and make tumors easier to identify. Pilocytic astrocytomas are typically clearly visible on such scans, but it is often difficult to say based on imaging alone what type of tumor is present.

If a tumor is found, it will be necessary for a neurosurgeon to perform a biopsy of it. This involves the removal of a small amount of tumorous tissue, which is then sent to a (neuro)pathologist for examination and staging. The biopsy may take place before surgical removal of the tumor, or the sample may be taken during surgery to remove the bulk of the tumor.

=== Microscopic appearance ===
Pilocytic astrocytomas are often cystic tumors, and, if solid, tend to be well-circumscribed.

Under the microscope, the tumor is seen to be composed of bipolar cells with long "hair-like" GFAP-positive processes, giving the designation "pilocytic" (that is, made up of cells that look like fibers when viewed under a microscope). Some pilocytic astrocytomas may be more fibrillary and dense in composition. The presence of Rosenthal fibers, eosinophilic granular bodies, and microcysts can often be seen. Myxoid foci and oligodendroglioma-like cells may also be present, though these are not specific to pilocytic astrocytoma. Long-standing lesions may show hemosiderin-laden macrophages and calcifications.

== Treatment ==
The most common form of treatment is having the tumor surgically removed. Complete removal of the tumor will generally allow functional survival for many years. In particular for pilocytic astrocytomas (commonly indolent masses that may permit normal neurologic function), surgeons may decide to monitor the neoplasm's evolution and postpone surgical intervention for some time. However, total resection is often not possible. The location could prohibit access to the neoplasm and lead to incomplete or no resection at all. Left unattended, these tumors may eventually lead to further symptoms due to continued slow growth. Extremely rarely, they may also undergo malignant transformation.

If surgery is not possible, recommendations such as chemotherapy or radiation may be suggested. However, side effects from these treatments can be extensive and long term, resulting in some cases in life-long difficulties. This has been demonstrated to be true only in pediatric patients whereas further study needs to be done for adults.

=== Side effects ===
After treatment, children with pilocytic astrocytoma may experience an improvement of symptoms related to the tumor itself depending on the location, but may also experience side effects related to the treatment:

- Symptoms related to increased pressure in the brain often disappear after surgical removal of the tumor.
- Effects on coordination and balance may improve and might progressively (to completely) disappear as recovery progresses.
- Steroid treatment is often used to control tissue swelling that may occur pre-and post-operatively.
- Patients can, however, also develop long-term side effects due to the type of treatment they may receive.

== Prognosis ==
In keeping with their assignment as WHO grade 1, pilocytic astrocytoma is not usually associated with recurrence after complete resection. The pilomyxoid astrocytoma variant may behave more aggressively than classic pilocytic astrocytoma, but this might also be associated with the younger age at presentation and their more frequent midline location.

In cases of progressive/recurrent disease or when maximal surgical removal has been achieved but some residual tumor remains, chemotherapy and/or radiation therapy may be considered by the medical team.

== Incidence ==
Regularly updated statistics about the incidence, epidemiology, and survival outcomes of brain tumors can be found in the annual reports of the Central Brain Tumor Registry of the United States (CBTRUS). These figures suggest that an average of just over 1,000 pilocytic astrocytomas are diagnosed per year in the US, representing about 1% of all CNS tumors. In children, however, the proportion is much higher. Pilocytic astrocytoma is the single most common childhood brain tumor, accounting for almost 20% of brain tumors diagnosed in 0–14 year-olds, with a peak incidence between 5–14 years of age.

== Additional images ==
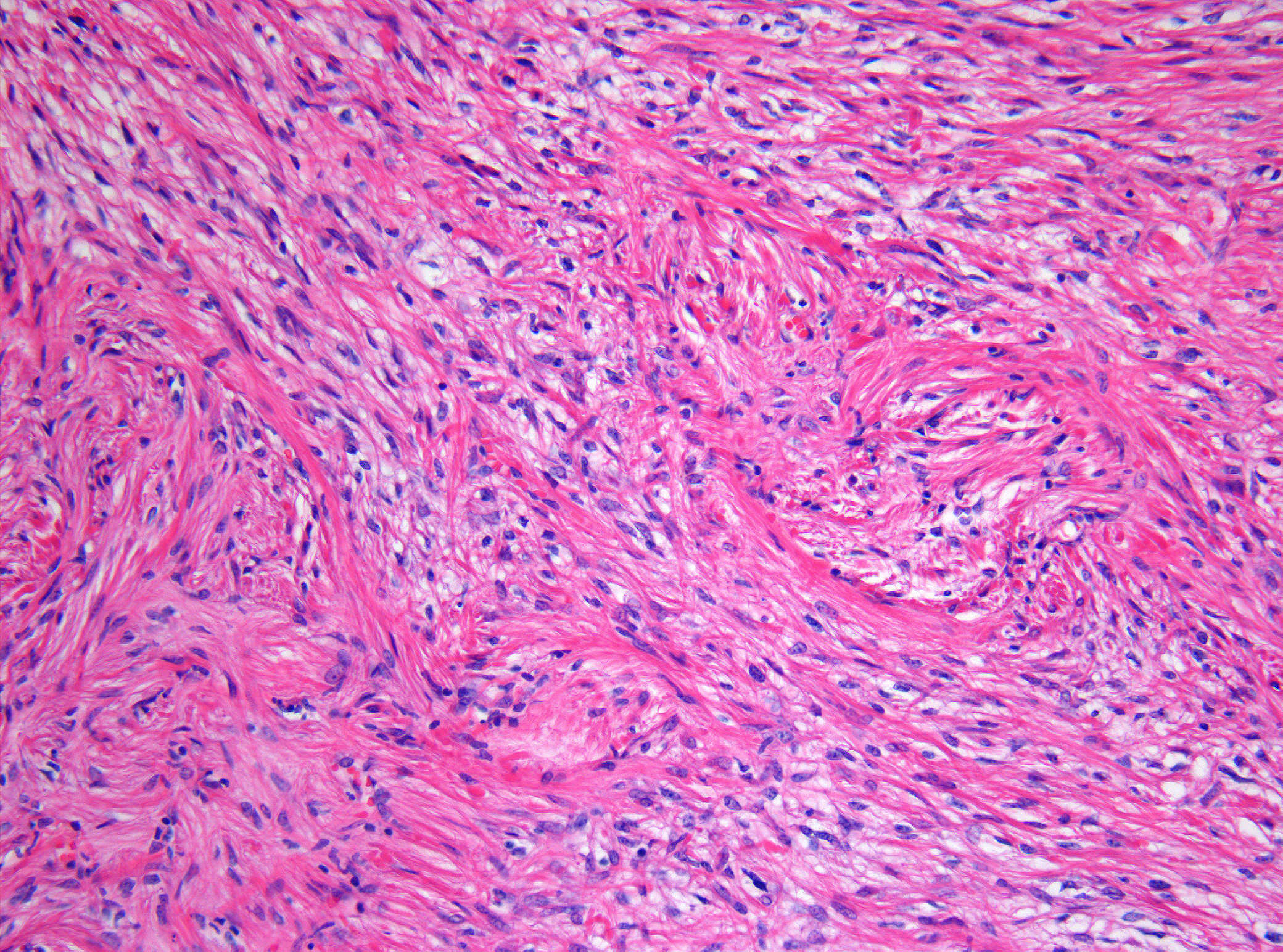
Histopathology of pilocytic astrocytoma (grade I WHO). H&E stain. Original magnification 200x.

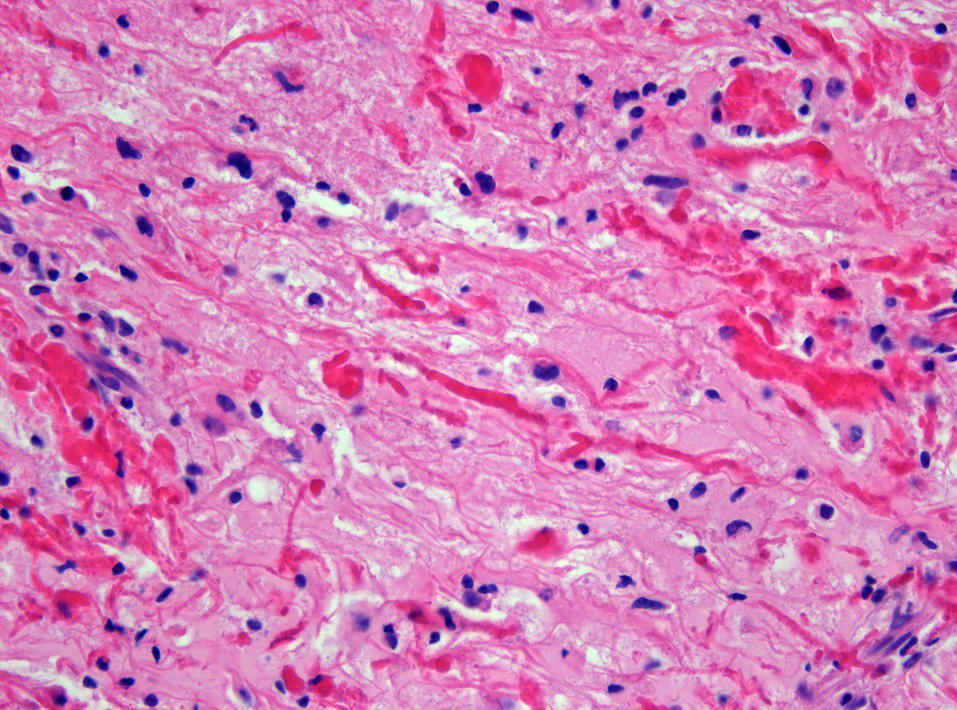
Histopathology of Rosenthal-fibres. H&E staining showing these elongated eosinophilic structures in the case of pilocytic astrocytoma. Magnification 400x
