= Ludwig Merzbacher =

German neuropathologist and psychiatrist

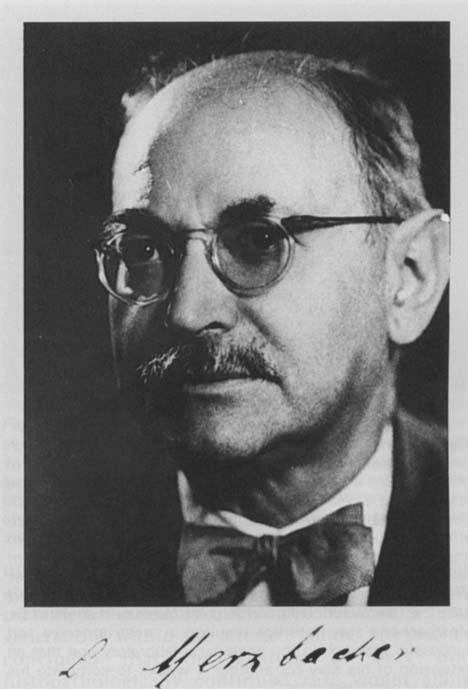
- Ludwig Merzbacher (ca. 1925)
- Born: February 9, 1875; Florence, Kingdom of Italy
- Died: October 30, 1942 (aged 67)
- Education: University of Strasbourg
- Known for: description of Pelizaeus–Merzbacher disease
- Scientific career
- Fields: Neuropathology, psychiatry
- Workplaces: University of Strasbourg, psychiatric clinic in Freiburg im Breisgau, psychiatric clinic in Heidelberg, University of Tübingen, German Hospital in Buenos Aires

Ludwig Merzbacher (9 February 1875 – 30 October 1942) was a German neuropathologist and psychiatrist born in Florence, Italy.

In 1900 he received his medical doctorate from the University of Strassburg, and afterwards remained in Strassburg as an assistant at the physiological institute. Later he worked at psychiatric clinics in Freiburg (1902–04) and Heidelberg (1904–06), and obtained his habilitation for psychiatry in 1906 at the University of Tübingen.

From 1906 until 1910 he worked at the psychiatric clinic in Tübingen, where he was an assistant to Robert Gaupp (1870–1953). During this time period, he also spent several months in Munich, conducting research in the laboratory of Alois Alzheimer (1864–1915). Here he performed in-depth analysis on the reaction patterns of scavenger cells (reactive microglia).

In 1910 Merzbacher moved to Argentina, where he was appointed head of the laboratory in the psychiatric clinic at Buenos Aires. From 1914 to 1919 he was in charge of the department of pathological anatomy at the Clínica Modelö, and at the beginning of 1924, he was chief physician at the "German hospital" in Buenos Aires.

He is remembered for his pathological studies of a dysmyelinating central nervous system disorder that is now referred to as "Pelizaeus–Merzbacher disease" (PMD). This eponymous disease is named after German balneologist Friedrich Christoph Pelizaeus (1851–1942). Merzbacher described his research of the disorder in a 1910 paper titled Eine eigenartige familiärhereditäre Erkrankungform.
