= Alexander disease =

Rare genetic disorder of the white matter of the brain

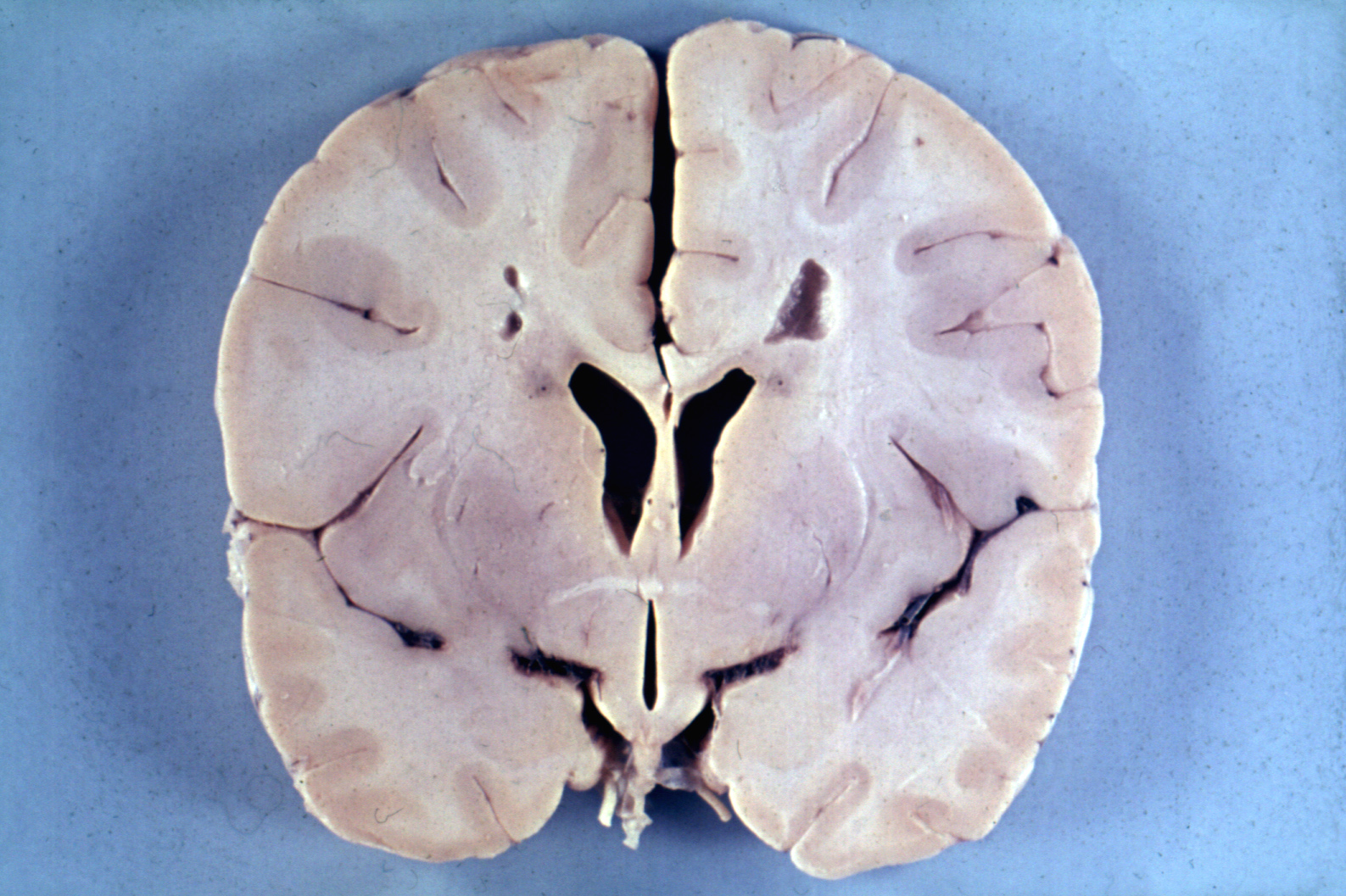
- Brain of a 4-year-old boy with Alexander disease showing macroencephaly and periventricular leukomalacia (note brownish discoloration around the cerebral ventricles)
- Specialty: Endocrinology, neurology

Alexander disease is a very rare autosomal dominant leukodystrophy, which are neurological conditions caused by anomalies in the myelin which protects nerve fibers in the brain. The most common type is the infantile form that usually begins during the first two years of life. Symptoms include mental and physical developmental delays, followed by the loss of developmental milestones, an abnormal increase in head size and seizures. The juvenile form of Alexander disease has an onset between the ages of 2 and 13 years. These children may have excessive vomiting, difficulty swallowing and speaking, poor coordination, and loss of motor control. Adult-onset forms of Alexander disease are less common. The symptoms sometimes mimic those of Parkinson's disease or multiple sclerosis, or may present primarily as a psychiatric disorder.

According to the National Institute of Neurological Disorders and Stroke, the destruction of white matter is accompanied by the formation of Rosenthal fibers—abnormal clumps of protein that accumulate in astrocytes in the brain.

The disease was first documented in 1949 by W. Stewart Alexander, who treated a 15-month-old infant presenting with megalencephaly, hydrocephaly, seizures, and developmental delays. Between 1949 and 1964, 15 more cases with similar symptoms were observed, leading to suggestions that the cases were the same disease and that the disease be named after Alexander.

The disease occurs in both males and females, and no ethnic, racial, geographic or cultural/economic differences are seen in its distribution. Alexander disease is a progressive and often fatal disease.

== Presentation ==
Symptoms observed include delays in development of some physical, psychological and behavioral skills; progressive enlargement of the head (macrocephaly), seizures, spasticity, and in some cases also hydrocephalus, idiopathic intracranial hypertension, and dementia. Symptoms vary greatly between patients.

In cases of early-onset or neonatal Alexander disease, symptoms include seizures, fluid buildup in the brain, high protein levels in cerebrospinal fluid, and severe motor and intellectual impairment. In cases of type I Alexander disease, where the condition appears before age 4, symptoms include seizures, enlarged brain and head, stiffness in the limbs, delayed intellectual and physical development, recurrent vomiting, and difficulties with gaining weight. In cases of type II Alexander disease, where the condition appears after the age of 4, symptoms include speech problems, difficulty swallowing, poor coordination, scoliosis, recurrent vomiting, and difficulties with gaining weight.

=== Classification ===
Traditionally, Alexander disease has been classified by age at onset and is divided into infantile, juvenile, and adult forms. In line with this method of classification, some researchers have proposed adding an additional neonatal division for cases where the disease began before birth. These divisions have the following characteristics:

Form	Age at Onset	Symptoms/Pathology
Neonatal	< 1 month	hydrocephalus, developmental delays, seizures, no ataxia
Infantile	0–2 years	megalencephaly, developmental delays, seizures, failure to thrive
Juvenile	2–12 years	ataxia, gait disturbance, basal ganglia and thalamus abnormalities
Adult	> 12 years	brainstem and spinal cord abnormalities, bulbar symptoms

Other researchers have adopted a classification system with two divisions, Type I and Type II. The divisions have the following major characteristics:

Type	Onset	Symptoms/Pathology	MRI Features
Type I	early	seizures, megalencephaly	typical
Type II	late	brainstem features	atypical

== Cause ==
Alexander disease is a genetic disorder primarily affecting the midbrain and cerebellum of the central nervous system. It is caused by mutations in the gene for glial fibrillary acidic protein (GFAP) that maps to chromosome 17q21. It is inherited in an autosomal dominant manner, such that the child of a parent with the disease has a 50% chance of inheriting the condition, if the parent is heterozygotic. However, most cases arise de novo as the result of sporadic mutations.

Alexander disease belongs to leukodystrophies, a group of diseases that affect the growth or development of the myelin sheath. The destruction of white matter in the brain is accompanied by the formation of fibrous, eosinophilic deposits known as Rosenthal fibers.

== Pathology ==
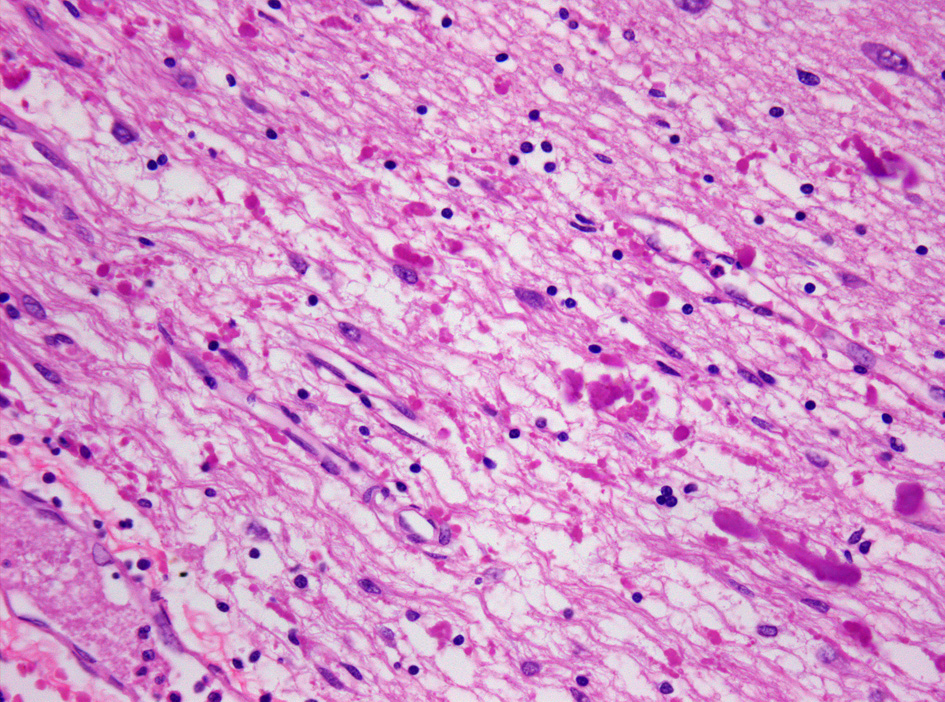
Rosenthal fibers characteristic of Alexander disease

Alexander disease causes the gradual loss of bodily functions and the ability to talk. It also causes an overload of long-chain fatty acids in the brain, which destroy the myelin sheath. The cause of Alexander disease is a gain-of-function mutation in the gene encoding GFAP. The mutation causes protein aggregates called Rosenthal fibers to form in astrocytes' cytoplasm, but the exact method of this formation mechanism is not well understood. Rosenthal fibers appear not to be present in healthy people, but occur in specific diseases, like some forms of cancer, Alzheimer's, Parkinson's, Huntington's, and ALS. The Rosenthal fibers found in Alexander disease do not share the distribution or concentration of other diseases and disorders.

A CT scan of a patient with Alexander disease typically shows:

- Decreased density of white matter
- Frontal lobe predominance
- Dilated lateral ventricles may present

An MRI scan of a patient with Alexander disease typically shows:

- Periventricular white matter change
- Medullar atrophy
- Signal change in the spinal cord

== Diagnosis ==
Detecting the signs of Alexander disease is possible with magnetic resonance imaging (MRI), which looks for specific changes in the brain that may be tell-tale signs for the disease. It is even possible to detect adult-onset Alexander disease with MRI. Alexander disease may also be revealed by genetic testing for its known cause. A rough diagnosis may also be made through revealing of clinical symptoms, including enlarged head size, along with radiological studies, and negative tests for other leukodystrophies. However, due to the similarity of symptoms to other diseases such as multiple sclerosis, many adults experience misdiagnosis until they receive an MRI scan confirming Alexander disease pathology.

== Treatment ==
Zilganersen (Zanvastro) was approved for medical use in the United States in September 2026.

== Prognosis ==
The prognosis is generally poor. Individuals with the infantile form usually die before the age of seven. The average duration of the infantile form is usually about three years. Duration of the juvenile form is about six years. Usually, the later the disease occurs, the slower its course.

== Prevalence ==
Its occurrence is very rare, with an estimated 1 in 2.7 million prevalence. More Type I cases have been reported than Type II cases, but researchers believe this may be due to high rates of misdiagnosis in adults.

== See also ==
- The Myelin Project
- The Stennis Foundation
