= APEH (gene) =

Protein-coding gene in humans

Identifiers
- Aliases: APEH, AARE, ACPH, APH, D3F15S2, D3S48E, DNF15S2, OPH, acylaminoacyl-peptide hydrolase
- External IDs: OMIM: 102645; MGI: 88041; GeneCards: APEH
Enzyme activity
EC #	BRENDA	ExPASy	KEGG	MetaCyc
3.4.19.1	↗	↗	↗	↗

Gene location (Human)
Chr.	Chromosome 3 (human)
Band	3p21.31	Start	49,674,014 bp
Band	3p21.31	End	49,683,971 bp

Gene location (Mouse)
Chr.	Chromosome 9 (mouse)
Band	9 F1|9 59.07 cM	Start	107,962,612 bp
Band	9 F1|9 59.07 cM	End	107,971,805 bp
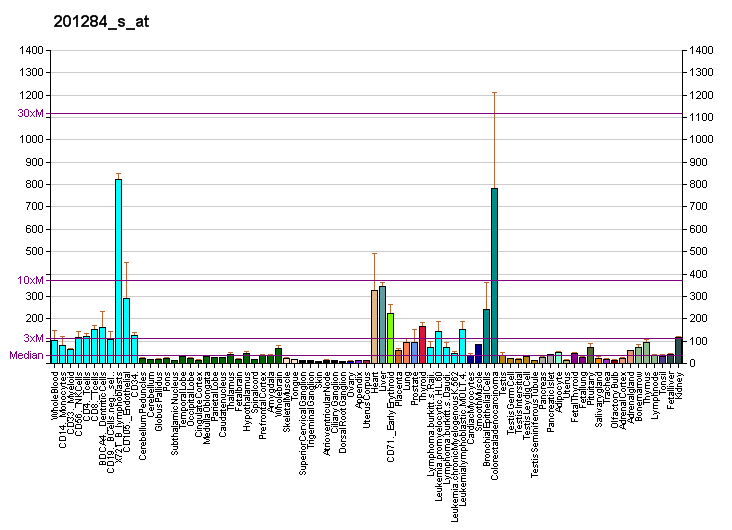
RNA expression pattern
Bgee	Human / Mouse (ortholog); Top expressed in: mucosa of transverse colon; anterior pituitary; muscle of thigh; right lobe of thyroid gland; left lobe of thyroid gland; right adrenal gland; right adrenal cortex; apex of heart; left adrenal gland; left adrenal cortex / Top expressed in: fetal liver hematopoietic progenitor cell; right kidney; human kidney; epithelium of small intestine; interventricular septum; duodenum; jejunum; left lobe of liver; spleen; intestinal villus; More reference expression data
BioGPS	More reference expression data
Gene ontology
Molecular function	omega peptidase activity; serine-type peptidase activity; protein binding; hydrolase activity; serine-type endopeptidase activity; identical protein binding; RNA binding
Cellular component	nuclear membrane; extracellular exosome; extracellular region; cytoplasm; cytosol; ficolin-1-rich granule lumen
Biological process	translational termination; amyloid-beta metabolic process; proteolysis; neutrophil degranulation
Sources:Amigo / QuickGO
Orthologs
Databases	NCBI: entry; OMA: entry
Species	Human	Mouse
Entrez	327	235606
Ensembl	ENSG00000164062	ENSMUSG00000032590
UniProt	P13798	Q8R146
RefSeq (mRNA)	NM_001640	NM_146226
RefSeq (protein)	NP_001631	NP_666338
Location (UCSC)	Chr 3: 49.67 – 49.68 Mb	Chr 9: 107.96 – 107.97 Mb
PubMed search
- Wikidata
View/Edit Human	View/Edit Mouse

Acylamino-acid-releasing enzyme is an enzyme that in humans is encoded by the APEH gene.

This enzyme catalyzes the hydrolysis of the terminal acetylated amino acid preferentially from small acetylated peptides. The acetyl amino acid formed by this hydrolase is further processed to acetate and a free amino acid by an aminoacylase. This gene is located within the same region of chromosome 3 (3p21) as the aminoacylase gene, and deletions at this locus are also associated with a decrease in aminoacylase activity. The acylpeptide hydrolase is a homotetrameric protein of 300 kDa with each subunit consisting of 732 amino acid residues. It can play an important role in destroying oxidatively-damaged proteins in living cells. Deletions of this gene locus are found in various types of carcinomas, including small-cell lung carcinoma and renal cell carcinoma.
