= Binding domain =

Region of a protein which can bind to biomolecules with chemical specificity

In molecular biology, binding domain is a protein domain which binds to a specific atom or molecule, such as calcium or DNA. A protein domain is a part of a protein sequence and a tertiary structure that can change or evolve, function, and live by itself independent of the rest of the protein chain. Upon binding, proteins may undergo a conformational change. Binding domains are essential for the function of many proteins. They are essential because they help splice, assemble, and translate proteins.

Examples of binding domains include the Zinc finger, which binds to DNA, and EF hand, which binds to calcium.

== See also ==
- DNA-binding domain
- Epitope
- Receptor (biochemistry)
