= Canavan disease =

Neurodegenerative disorder

- Other names: Canavan–van Bogaert–Bertrand disease
- Specialty: Endocrinology, neurology

Canavan disease, or Canavan–Van Bogaert–Bertrand disease, is a rare and fatal autosomal recessive degenerative disease that causes progressive damage to nerve cells and loss of white matter in the brain. It is one of the most common degenerative cerebral diseases of infancy. It is caused by a deficiency of the enzyme aspartoacylase, and is one of a group of genetic diseases referred to as leukodystrophies. It is characterized by degeneration of myelin in the phospholipid layer insulating the axon of a neuron and is associated with a gene located on human chromosome 17.

== Signs and symptoms ==
The signs and symptoms of the most common (and most serious) form of Canavan disease typically appear in early infancy usually between the first three to six months of age. Canavan disease then progresses rapidly from that stage, with typical cases involving intellectual disability, loss of previously acquired motor skills, feeding difficulties, abnormal muscle tone (i.e., initial floppiness – hypotonia – that may eventually translate into spasticity), poor head control, and megalocephaly (abnormally enlarged head). Paralysis, blindness, or seizures may also occur.

There exists a much less common variant of Canavan disease which is generally much less serious and involves later onset of symptoms, which are often mild and nonspecific enough to go unrecognized as manifestations of Canavan's disease. This variant does not seem to have any effect on lifespan and is typically limited to minor cases of speech and motor skill development delay.

== Pathophysiology ==
Canavan disease has an autosomal recessive pattern of inheritance.

Canavan disease is inherited in an autosomal recessive fashion. When both parents are carriers, the chance of having an affected child is 25%. Genetic counseling and genetic testing are recommended for families with two parental carriers.

Canavan disease is caused by a defective ASPA gene which is responsible for the production of the enzyme aspartoacylase. Decreased aspartoacylase activity prevents the normal breakdown of N-acetylaspartate, wherein the accumulation of N-acetylaspartate, or lack of its further metabolism interferes with the growth of the myelin sheath of the nerve fibers of the brain. The myelin sheath is the fatty covering that surrounds nerve cells and acts as an insulator, allowing for efficient transmission of nerve impulses.

== Diagnosis ==
The diagnosis of neonatal/infantile Canavan disease relies on the demonstration of a very high concentration of N-acetylaspartic acid (NAA) in the urine. In mild/juvenile Canavan disease, NAA may only be slightly elevated; thus, the diagnosis relies on molecular genetic testing of ASPA, the gene encoding the enzyme aspartoacylase.

== Treatment ==
No cure for Canavan disease is known, nor is there a standard course of treatment. Treatment is symptomatic and supportive. Physical therapy may help improve motor skills, and educational programs may help improve communication skills. Seizures are treated with antiepileptic drugs and gastrostomy is used to help maintain adequate food intake and hydration when swallowing difficulties exist. Also, an experimental treatment uses lithium citrate. When a person has Canavan disease, their levels of N-acetylaspartate are chronically elevated. The lithium citrate was proven in a rat genetic model of Canavan disease to decrease levels of N-acetyl aspartate significantly. When tested on a human, the subject's condition reversed during a two-week wash-out period after withdrawal of lithium.

The investigation revealed both decreased N-acetylaspartate levels in regions of the brain tested and magnetic resonance spectroscopic values that are more characteristic of normal development and myelination. This evidence suggests that a larger controlled trial of lithium may be warranted as supportive therapy for children with Canavan disease.

Experimental gene therapy trial results, published in 2002, used a healthy gene to take over for the defective one that causes Canavan disease.

In human trials, the results of which were published in 2012, this method appeared to improve the patient's life without long-term adverse effects during a five-year follow-up.

== Prognosis ==
Canavan disease typically results in death or development of life-threatening conditions by the age of ten, though life expectancy is variable, and is highly dependent on specific circumstances. On the other hand, the milder variants of the disorder seem not to have any effect on lifespan.

== Prevalence ==
Although Canavan disease may occur in any ethnic group, it mostly affects people of Eastern European Jewish ancestry with about one in 40 (2.5%) individuals of Eastern European (Ashkenazi) Jewish ancestry being a carrier.

== History ==
Canavan disease was first described in 1931 by Myrtelle Canavan. In 1931, she co-wrote a paper discussing the case of a child who had died at 16 months old and whose brain had a spongy white section. Canavan was the first to identify this degenerative disorder of the central nervous system, which was later named Canavan disease.

=== Lawsuit ===
The discovery of the gene for Canavan disease, and subsequent events, generated considerable controversy. In 1987, the Greenbergs, a family with two children affected by Canavan disease, donated tissue samples to Reuben Matalon, a researcher at the University of Chicago, who was looking for the Canavan gene. He successfully identified the gene in 1993 and developed a test for it that would enable antenatal (before birth) counseling of couples at risk of having a child with the disease. For a while, the Canavan Foundation offered free genetic testing using Matalon's test.

However, in 1997, after he relocated to Florida, Matalon's new employer, Miami Children's Hospital, patented the gene and started claiming royalties on the genetic test, forcing the Canavan Foundation to withdraw their free testing. A subsequent lawsuit brought by the Canavan Foundation against Miami Children's Hospital was resolved with a sealed out-of-court settlement. The case is sometimes cited in arguments about the appropriateness of patenting genes.

== Research ==
Research involving triacetin supplementation has shown promise in a rat model. Triacetin, which can be enzymatically cleaved to form acetate, enters the brain more readily than the negatively charged acetate. The defective enzyme in Canavan disease, aspartoacylase, converts N-acetylaspartate into aspartate and acetate. Mutations in the gene for aspartoacylase prevent the breakdown of N-acetylaspartate and reduce brain acetate availability during brain development. Acetate supplementation using triacetin is meant to provide the missing acetate so brain development can continue normally.

A team of researchers headed by Paola Leone at the University of Medicine and Dentistry of New Jersey, has tried a procedure involving the insertion of six catheters into the brain that deliver a solution containing 600 to 900 billion engineered virus particles. The virus, a modified version of adeno-associated virus, is designed to replace the aspartoacylase enzyme. Children treated with this procedure to date have shown marked improvements, including the growth of myelin, with decreased levels of the N-acetylaspartate toxin.

A team of researchers of University of Massachusetts Medical School is working on developing rAAV-based and optimized gene replacement therapy, that would travel across the blood-brain-barrier.

Researchers discovered the first drug-like inhibitors of N-acetyltransferase.

== See also ==
- The Myelin Project
- The Stennis Foundation
- Fern Kupfer
