= Leukodystrophy =

Group of disorders characterised by degeneration of white matter in the brain

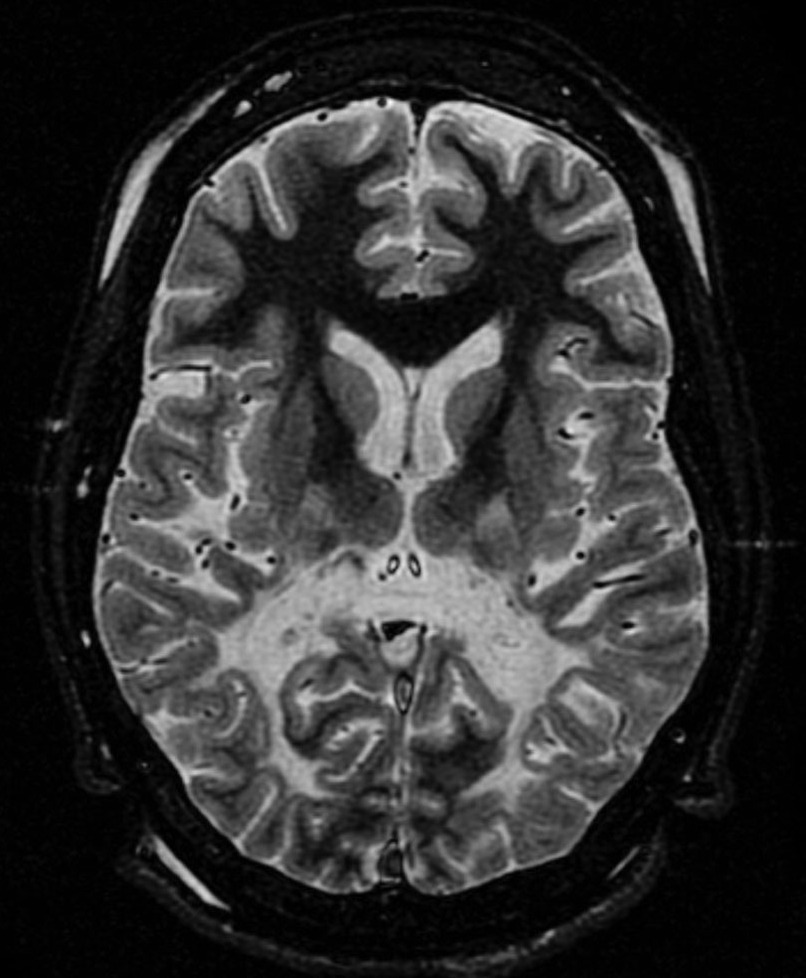
- T2 weighted axial scan of a human brain at the level of the caudate heads demonstrates marked loss of posterior white matter, with reduced volume and increased signal intensity. The anterior white matter is spared. Features are consistent with X-linked adrenoleukodystrophy.
- Specialty: Neurology

Leukodystrophies are a group of usually inherited disorders, characterized by degeneration of the white matter in the brain. The word leukodystrophy comes from the Greek roots leuko, "white", dys, "abnormal" and troph, "growth". The leukodystrophies are caused by imperfect growth or development of the glial cells which produce the myelin sheath, the fatty insulating covering around nerve fibers. Leukodystrophies may be classified as hypomyelinating or demyelinating diseases, respectively, depending on whether the damage is present before birth or occurs after. While all leukodystrophies are the result of genetic mutations, other demyelinating disorders have an autoimmune, infectious, or metabolic etiology.

When damage occurs to white matter, subsequent immune responses can lead to inflammation in the central nervous system (CNS), along with the loss of myelin. The degeneration of white matter can be seen in an MRI scan and is used to diagnose leukodystrophy. Leukodystrophy is characterized by specific symptoms, including decreased motor function, muscle rigidity, and eventual degeneration of sight and hearing. While the disease is fatal, the age of onset is a key factor, as infants have a typical life expectancy of 2–8 years, while adults typically live more than a decade after onset. Treatment options are limited, although hematopoietic stem cell transplantations using bone marrow or cord blood seem to help in certain leukodystrophy types, while further research is being done.

The combined incidence of the leukodystrophies is estimated at 1 in 7,600. The majority of types involve the inheritance of an X-linked recessive, or X-linked dominant trait, while others, although involving a defective gene, are the result of spontaneous mutation rather than genetic inheritance.

== Symptoms and signs ==
Some specific symptoms vary from one type of leukodystrophy to the next, but the vast majority of symptoms are shared as the causes for the disease generally have the same effects. Symptoms are dependent on the age of onset, which is predominantly in infancy and early childhood, although the exact time of onset may be difficult to determine. Hyperirritability and hypersensitivity to the environment are common, as well as some tell-tale physical signs including muscle rigidity and a backwards-bent head. Botox therapy is often used to treat patients with spasticity. Juvenile and adult onsets display similar symptoms including a decrease or loss in hearing and vision. While children do experience optic and auditory degeneration, the course of the disease is usually too rapid, causing death relatively quickly, whereas adults may live with these conditions for many years. In children, spastic activity often precedes progressive ataxia and rapid cognitive deterioration which has been described as intellectual disability. Epilepsy is commonplace for patients of all ages. More progressed patients show weakness in deglutition, leading to spastic coughing fits due to inhaled saliva. Classic symptomatic progression of juvenile X-linked adrenoleukodystrophy is shown in the 1992 film, Lorenzo's Oil.

Course and timetable are dependent on the age of onset with infants showing a lifespan of 2–8 years, juveniles 2–10 years and adults typically 10+ years. Adults typically see an extended period of stability followed by a decline to a vegetative state and death. While treatments do exist, most are in the experimental phase and can only promise a halt in the progression of symptoms, although some gene therapies have shown some symptomatic improvement. The debilitating course of the disease has led to numerous philosophical and ethical arguments over experimental clinical trials, patients' rights and physician-assisted suicide.

== Causes ==
While the more specific underlying causes of leukodystrophy are dependent upon the type, there are common pathophysiological patterns that can be seen amongst all types. First and foremost, leukodystrophy is a neurodegenerative disease that is always the result of both impairment and maintenance of myelin sheaths surrounding neuronal axons in the central nervous system as the result of a genetic mutation. Myelin is a fatty white substance that acts as an electrical insulator and coats axons in order to speed up impulses (i.e., action potentials) traveling down the axon. Thus, the natural result of a loss of this substance is decreased efficiency in impulse propagation. As myelin is produced by oligodendrocytes (a type of glial cell) in the central nervous system, an easy place to look for the cause is a mutation or malfunctioning of these cells and in other glial cells.

=== Genetic influence ===
Autorecessive Inheritance Pattern

Inherited forms of leukodystrophy are usually the result of an autosomal recessive inheritance pattern, although dominant inheritance patterns are not unheard of, as in the case of adult-onset leukodystrophy. This means that the affected allele is carried on an autosomal, or non-sex, chromosome and is masked by the dominant, unaffected phenotype. In other words, for an individual to inherit the leukodystrophy phenotype, he or she must carry two of the recessive, mutant alleles. Krabbe disease and metachromatic leukodystrophy (MLD) are two of such type. MLD is found on human chromosome 22 at position q13.31. Another type of inherited leukodystrophy is X-linked adrenoleukodystrophy (X-ALD). As its name implies, this type of leukodystrophy is the result of a mutation found on the X-chromosome. It is also carried in a recessive pattern. The X chromosome is a sex chromosome, and since women have two "chances" of acquiring a normal X chromosome (one maternal x, one paternal x), and males only one chance (one maternal x), this disease is more likely to be seen in males than in females. The mutation resulting in adult-onset leukodystrophy is mapped at 5q23.

== Pathophysiology ==
Although there are nearly 40 different types of leukodystrophy, many are lacking in formal and comprehensive research. Most of the research so far has been done on five types: (1) metachromatic leukodystrophy (MLD), (2) Krabbe disease, (3) X-Linked adrenoleukodystrophy (ALD), (4) Canavan disease, and (5) Alexander disease. Each type of leukodystrophy has a unique pathophysiology, but all five of these in some way affect a subset of glial cells, therefore disrupting myelin production and maintenance, and usually involve a mutation involving genes that code for enzymes necessary for the catabolism of very long chain fatty acids (VLCFAs) that are toxic to the myelin-producing cells of the central nervous system.

=== Metachromatic leukodystrophy ===
Metachromatic leukodystrophy is the result of genetic defects in the enzymes associated with the cellular compartment called the lysosome. MLD is one of two leukodystophies that are also a lysosomal storage disorder. MLD is inherited in an autosomal recessive way and is the result of mutations in three different ARSA alleles that encode the enzyme arylsulfatase A (ASA or sometimes ARSA), also called sulfatide sulfatase. ASA is responsible for the breakdown of sulfatides, sphingolipids present in neuronal membranes as well as in myelin. When there is a mutation in the gene that encodes ASA, it decreases ASA production, which subsequently leads to diminished degradation of sulfatides, thus causing them to accumulate. This accumulation of sulfatides is toxic to oligodendrocytes, the myelin-producing cells of the CNS, effectively leading to a disturbance in myelin structure followed by demyelination. The pattern of inheritance of the three different alleles affects what type of MLD a person develops. Two null alleles are responsible for the infantile version, and do not allow for any production of ASA. A heterozygous individual (one null allele, one non-null allele) develops the juvenile form and has some production of ASA, while an individual with two mutated non-null alleles develops the adult form.

=== Krabbe disease ===
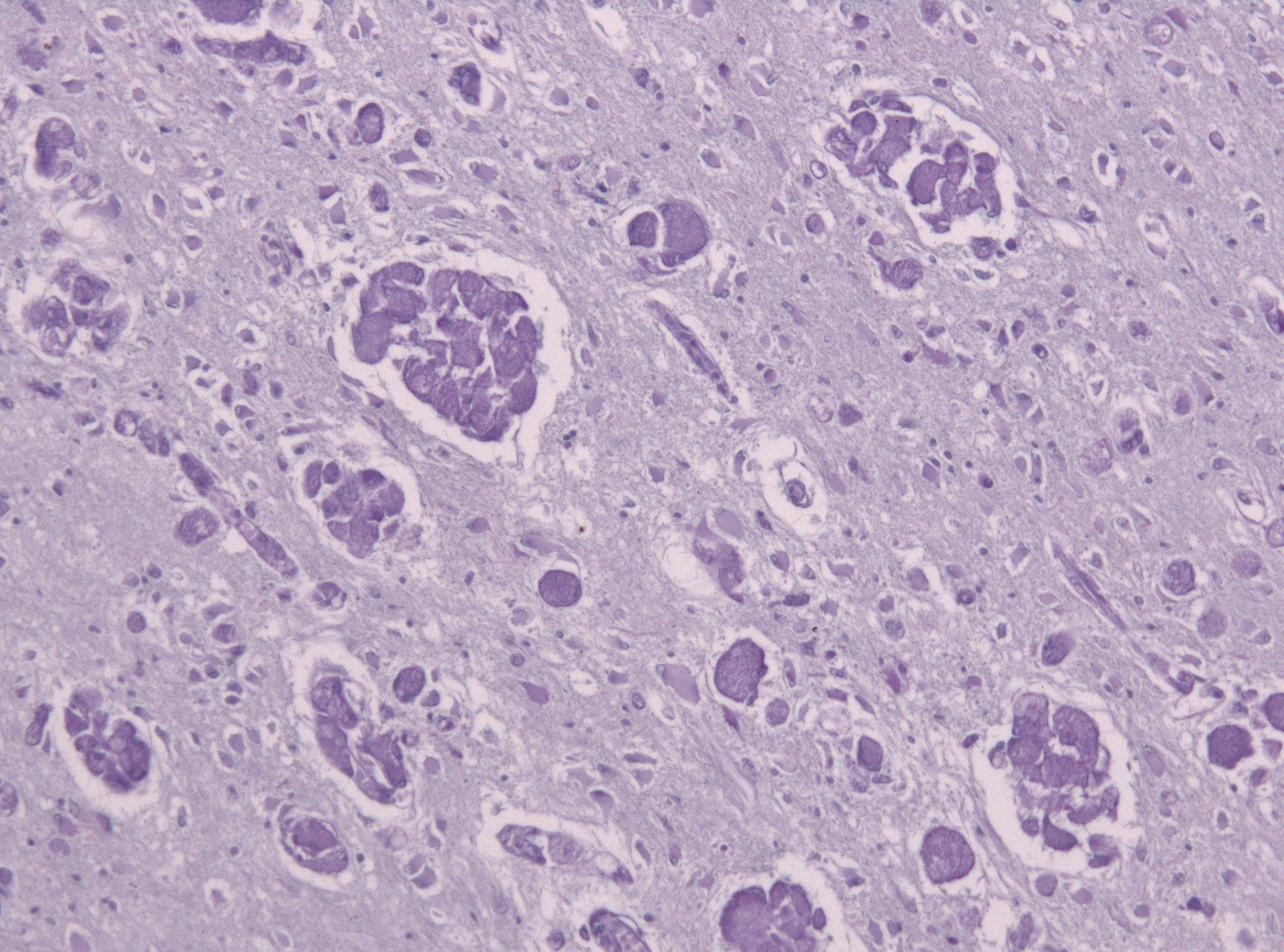
Globoid cell leukodystrophy PAS - Multinucleated macrophages ("globoid cells") and loss of myelinated fibers in a tissue sample of Krabbe's leukodystrophy

Like MLD, Krabbe disease is another type of leukodystrophy with autosomal recessive inheritance that is the result of a lysosomal storage disorder. It is due to a deletion in exon 16 of the GALC gene that causes a frameshift mutation leading to a premature stop codon. The GALC gene, found on chromosome 14 at position 31 (14q31), codes for the enzyme beta-galactocerebrosidase (GALC). GALC is a lysosomal enzyme responsible for the catabolism of galactolipids, especially the toxic lipid psychosine, that are widely distributed throughout the brain. A deficiency in GALC thus causes a buildup of these fatty acids, leading to an incursion by cells called "globoid macrophages" that destroy oligodendrocytes, thereby inhibiting any further myelin formation. Given the presence of globoid macrophages clustered near white matter, Krabbe disease often is called globoid cell leukodystrophy.

=== Canavan disease ===
Canavan disease is a less-studied type of leukodystrophy that, like MLD and Krabbe disease, is also inherited in an autosomal recessive pattern. It is due to a mutation in the ASPA gene that encodes aspartoacylase, an enzyme needed to metabolize N-acetyl-L-aspartate (NAA). The mutation causes a deficiency of aspartoacyclase. NAA is involved in the formation of lipids; if it is not broken down by aspartoacylase, lipid levels in the brain increase, causing demyelination.

=== X-linked adrenoleukodystrophy ===
In X-linked adrenoleukodystrophy (X-ALD), a mutation occurs in the peroxisomal ATP-binding cassette (ABC transporter). This leads to cerebral inflammatory demyelination caused by myelin destabilization. The inflammatory demyelination begins in the corpus callosum and slowly progresses outwards into both hemispheres. In X-ALD patients, abnormally high levels of VLCFA accumulate in various body tissues and fluids. This increased concentration then incorporates into various complex lipids where VLCFAs are not normally found. This has been found to be directly involved in the cerebral inflammation of X-ALD. It is speculated that the accumulated and embedded VLCFA in the complex lipids could lead to the destabilization of the myelin sheath and eventually to demyelination.

=== Alexander disease ===
Alexander disease is unique from the leukodystrophies mentioned above, in that it is the result of spontaneous mutation, meaning that it is not inherited. The mutation found in an affected individual is not found in either of his or her parents. Symptoms result from the accumulation of Glial fibrillary acidic protein (GFAP) as the result of a mutation in the GFAP gene, whose protein, rather than being found in association with lysosomes or peroxisomes, is an intermediate filament linked to the nuclear envelope. Intermediate filaments are proteins responsible for the makeup of the cellular cytoskeleton; thus, this type of mutation causes abnormal structural development of a person's cells. Cytoskeletal and transporter molecule defects have been observed in the astrocytes of affected individuals. These astrocytes contain abnormally high levels of GFAP protein, affecting their development and function.

== Diagnosis ==
The degeneration of white matter, which reflects the degeneration of myelin, can be seen in a basic MRI and used to diagnose leukodystrophies of all types. T-1 and T-2 weighted fluid-attenuated inversion recovery (FLAIR) images are the most often used approach. Electrophysiological and other kinds of laboratory testing can also be done. In particular, nerve conduction velocity is looked at to distinguish between leukodystrophy and other demyelinating diseases, as well as to distinguish between individual leukodystrophies. For example, individuals with X-ALD have normal conduction velocities, while those with Krabbe disease or metachromatic leukodystrophy have abnormalities in their conduction velocities. Multigene sequencing panels for undifferentiated leukodystrophy are offered for rapid molecular diagnosis after genetic counselling.

=== Types ===
Specific types of leukodystrophy include the following with their respective ICD-10 codes when available:

- (E75.2) Alexander disease
- (E75.2) Canavan disease
- (E75.2) Hypomyelinating leukodystrophy type 7 (4H syndrome)
- (E75.2) Krabbe disease
- (E75.2) Metachromatic leukodystrophy
- (E75.2) Pelizaeus–Merzbacher disease
- (E75.5) Cerebrotendineous xanthomatosis
- (E88.43) Leukoencephalopathy with Brainstem and Spinal Cord Involvement and Lactate Elevation (LBSL)
- (G93.49) Leukoencephalopathy with vanishing white matter
- TUBB4A-related leukodystrophy

== Treatment ==
With many different types of leukodystrophy, with many causes, treatment therapies will vary for each type. Studies and clinical trials are seeking to find therapies for each of the different leukodystrophies. Stem cell transplants and gene therapy appear to be the most promising in treating all leukodystrophies, providing they take place as early as possible, prior to extensive neurological damage. In addition to these treatments, many people with leukodystrophies may benefit from other therapies such as physical, occupational, and speech therapy. This can help with mobility and adjusting to cognitive changes.

For hypomyelinating leukodystrophies, therapeutic research into cell-based therapies appears promising. Oligodendrocyte precursor cells and neural stem cells have been transplanted successfully and have shown to be healthy a year later. Fractional anisotropy and radial diffusivity maps showed possible myelination in the region of the transplant. Induced pluripotent stem cells, oligodendrocyte precursor cells, gene correction, and transplantation to promote the maturation, survival, and myelination of oligodendrocytes seem to be the primary routes for possible treatments.

For three types of leukodystrophies (X-linked adrenoleukodystrophy (X-ALD), metachromatic leukodystrophy (MLD) and Krabbe Disease (globoid cell leukodystrophy - GLD), gene therapy using autologous hematopoietic stem cells to transfer the healthy copy of the disease-causing gene with lentiviral vectors has been shown to succeed and has been used in clinical trials for X-ALD and MLD. The progression of X-ALD has been shown to be disrupted with hematopoietic stem cell gene therapy, although the proximal cause of arrested demyelination and the quantity of stem cells needed are unclear. While there continues to be an accumulation of very long chain fatty acids in the brain, this seems not to be the immediate causal factor behind the disease, as gene therapy does not correct the accumulation.

For those leukodystrophies that result from a deficiency of lysozyme enzymes, such as Krabbe disease, enzyme replacement therapy seems hopeful. However, enzyme delivery proves difficult, because the blood–brain barrier severely limits what can pass into the central nervous system. Current gene therapy research for metachromatic leukodystrophy has been reviewed with an emphasis on ex vivo transplantation of genetically modified hematopoietic stem cells.

== Epidemiology ==
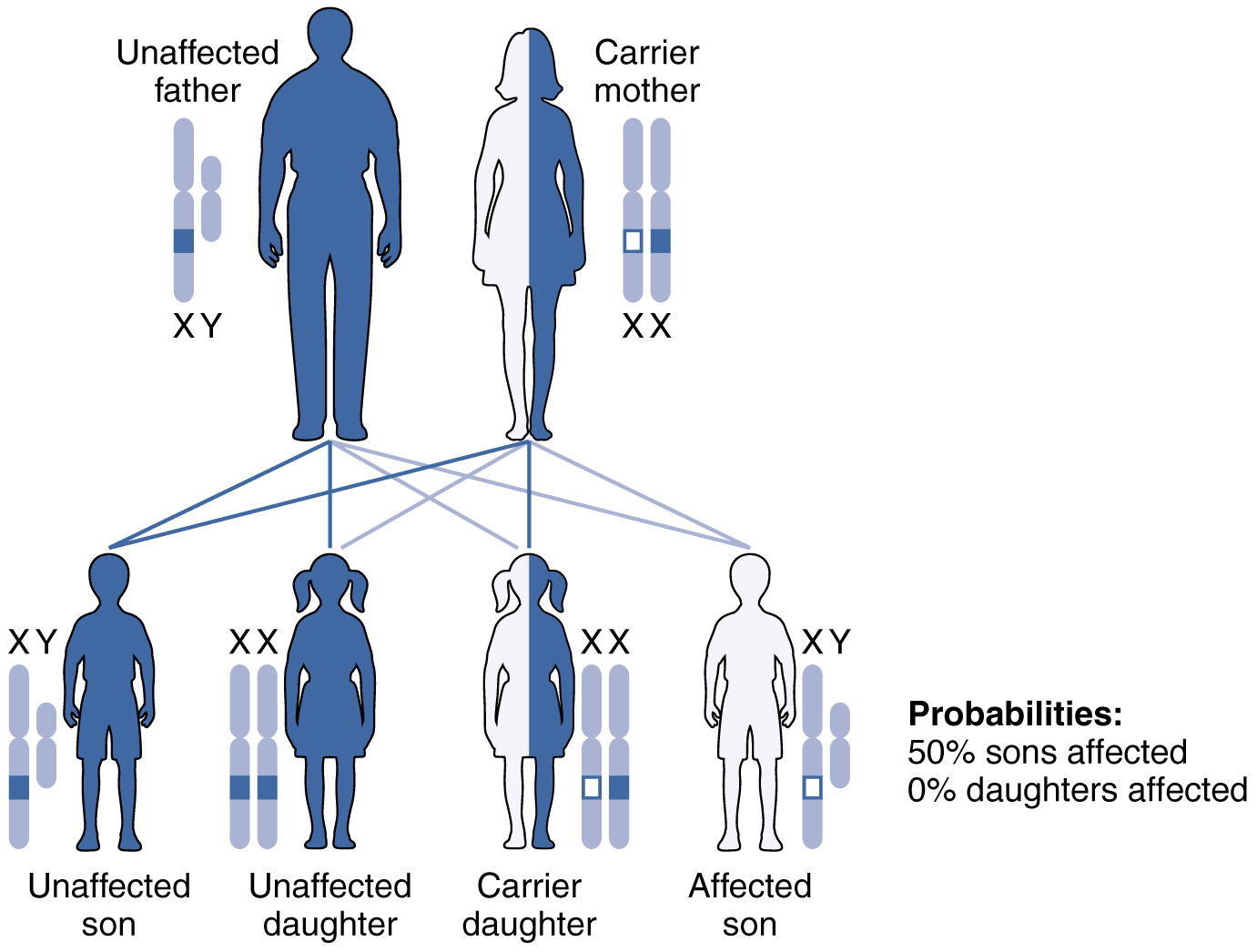
X-linked Recessive Inheritance

Currently, no research has shown a higher prevalence of most leukodystrophy types in any one place around the world. There is, however, a higher prevalence of Canavan disease in the Jewish population. One in 40 individuals of Ashkenazi Jewish descent are carriers of Canavan disease. This extrapolates to roughly 2.5%. Additionally, due to their autosomal recessive inheritance patterns, there is no significant difference found between males and females for most types of leukodystrophy, including but not limited to metachromatic leukodystrophy, Krabbe disease, Canavan disease, and Alexander disease. The one exception to this is any type of leukodystrophy carried on a sex chromosome, such as X-linked adrenoleukodystrophy, which is carried on the X-chromosome. Because of the inheritance pattern of X-linked diseases, males are more often affected by this type of leukodystrophy, while female carriers are often symptomatic, though not as severely affected as males.

== Research ==
The National Institute of Neurological Disorders and Stroke (NINDS, under the U.S. National Institutes of Health) supports research on genetic disorders, including the leukodystrophies. NINDS also supports researchers who are working with the Global Leukodystrophy Initiative Clinical Trials Network (GLIA-CTN) which promotes advances in the diagnosis and treatment of leukodystrophies.

The European Leukodystrophy Association also supports research into leukodystrophy. As of 2020, more than 387 research projects have been funded. Each year, ELA invites the international scientific community to submit research projects in the field of genetic leukodystrophies, the cerebral white matter in premature infants, and of myelin repair.

== Society ==
The United Leukodystrophy Foundation (ULF), incorporated in 1982, is a non-profit, voluntary health organization dedicated to funding cutting-edge research and to providing patients and their families with disease information and medical referrals.

Cure MLD is a global network of patient advocates and nonprofits dedicated to helping families impacted by metachromatic leukodystrophy (MLD).

The MLD Foundation was co-founded by Dean and Teryn Suhr in 2001 after the diagnosis in 1995 of two of their daughters with MLD. MLD Foundation serves families and works with researchers, clinicians, regulators, payors, and policy-makers around the world on MLD, leukodystrophy, lysosomal, and rare disease issues.

The Leukodystrophy Alliance works to promote awareness and quality of care for those with leukodystrophy.

Jill Kelly and her husband, NFL quarterback Jim Kelly, founded Hunter's Hope Foundation to fund research after their son Hunter (1997–2005) was diagnosed with infantile Krabbe leukodystrophy.

Matthew and Michael Clark of Hull, UK had the condition. Both died, in 2013 and 2016 respectively. Their story was the subject of the Channel 4 documentary The Curious Case of the Clark Brothers.

Augusto and Michaela Odone founded The Myelin Project after their son, Lorenzo was diagnosed with Adrenoleukodystrophy (ALD). The 1992 film, Lorenzo's Oil is a true story about a boy with Adrenoleukodystrophy (ALD).

== See also ==
- Leukoencephalopathy
