= Aminoacylase-1 =

Enzyme found in humans

ACY1
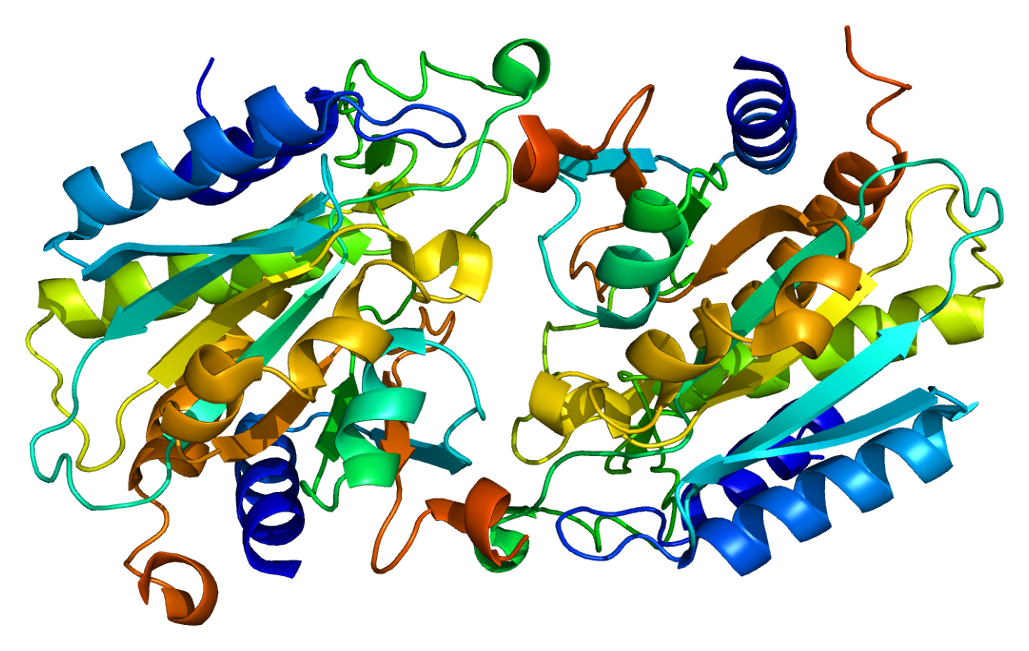

Identifiers
- Aliases: ACY1, ACY-1, ACY1D, HEL-S-5, aminoacylase 1
- External IDs: OMIM: 104620; MGI: 87913; GeneCards: ACY1
Available structures
PDB	Ortholog search: PDBe RCSB
PDB	List of PDB id codes 1Q7L
Enzyme activity
EC #	BRENDA	ExPASy	KEGG	MetaCyc
3.5.1.14	↗	↗	↗	↗

Gene location (Human)
Chr.	Chromosome 3 (human)
Band	3p21.2	Start	51,983,340 bp
Band	3p21.2	End	51,989,197 bp

Gene location (Mouse)
Chr.	Chromosome 9 (mouse)
Band	9 F1|9 57.49 cM	Start	106,310,180 bp
Band	9 F1|9 57.49 cM	End	106,315,518 bp
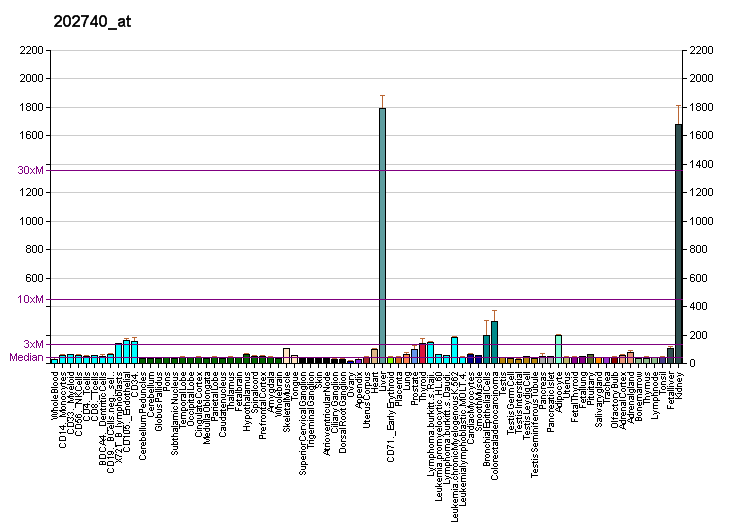
RNA expression pattern
Bgee	Human / Mouse (ortholog); Top expressed in: duodenum; right lobe of liver; human kidney; mucosa of transverse colon; renal cortex; right adrenal gland; right adrenal cortex; rectum; muscle of thigh; left adrenal gland / Top expressed in: right kidney; proximal tubule; yolk sac; human kidney; jejunum; duodenum; crypt of lieberkuhn of small intestine; left lobe of liver; embryo; ectoderm; More reference expression data
BioGPS	More reference expression data
Gene ontology
Molecular function	protein binding; hydrolase activity; metallopeptidase activity; metal ion binding; aminoacylase activity; identical protein binding
Cellular component	cytoplasm; cytosol; extracellular exosome
Biological process	xenobiotic metabolic process; cellular amino acid metabolic process; metabolism; proteolysis
Sources:Amigo / QuickGO
Orthologs
Databases	NCBI: entry; OMA: entry
Species	Human	Mouse
Entrez	95	109652
Ensembl	ENSG00000243989	ENSMUSG00000023262
UniProt	Q03154	Q99JW2
RefSeq (mRNA)	NM_001198898; NM_000666; NM_001198895; NM_001198896; NM_001198897	NM_001276442; NM_025371
RefSeq (protein)	NP_000657; NP_001185824; NP_001185825; NP_001185826; NP_001185827	NP_001263371; NP_079647
Location (UCSC)	Chr 3: 51.98 – 51.99 Mb	Chr 9: 106.31 – 106.32 Mb
PubMed search
- Wikidata
View/Edit Human	View/Edit Mouse

Aminoacylase-1 is an enzyme that in humans is encoded by the ACY1 gene.

== Function ==
Aminoacylase-1 is a cytosolic, homodimeric, zinc-binding enzyme that catalyzes the hydrolysis of acylated L-amino acids to L-amino acids and acyl group, and has been postulated to function in the catabolism and salvage of acylated amino acids. ACY1 has been assigned to chromosome 3p21.1, a region reduced to homozygosity in small-cell lung cancer (SCLC), and its expression has been reported to be reduced or undetectable in SCLC cell lines and tumors. The amino acid sequence of human aminoacylase-1 is highly homologous to the porcine counterpart, and ACY1 is the first member of a new family of zinc-binding enzymes.
