= Aspartoacylase =

Hydrolytic enzyme encoded on human chromosome 17

ASPA

Identifiers
- Aliases: ASPA, ACY2, ASP, aspartoacylase
- External IDs: OMIM: 608034; MGI: 87914; GeneCards: ASPA
Available structures
PDB	Ortholog search: PDBe RCSB
PDB	List of PDB id codes 4MRI, 2I3C, 2O4H, 2Q51, 2O53, 4NFR, 4MXU, 4TNU
Enzyme activity
EC #	BRENDA	ExPASy	KEGG	MetaCyc
3.5.1.15	↗	↗	↗	↗

Gene location (Human)
Chr.	Chromosome 17 (human)
Band	17p13.2	Start	3,472,374 bp
Band	17p13.2	End	3,503,405 bp

Gene location (Mouse)
Chr.	Chromosome 11 (mouse)
Band	11|11 B4	Start	73,195,818 bp
Band	11|11 B4	End	73,220,422 bp
RNA expression pattern
Bgee	Human / Mouse (ortholog); Top expressed in: corpus callosum; kidney tubule; internal globus pallidus; jejunal mucosa; trigeminal ganglion; inferior ganglion of vagus nerve; C1 segment; endothelial cell; inferior olivary nucleus; glomerulus / Top expressed in: right kidney; proximal tubule; sciatic nerve; jejunum; intestinal villus; human kidney; brown adipose tissue; deep cerebellar nuclei; globus pallidus; anterior horn of spinal cord; More reference expression data
BioGPS	n/a
Gene ontology
Molecular function	protein binding; hydrolase activity; hydrolase activity, acting on carbon-nitrogen (but not peptide) bonds, in linear amides; metal ion binding; hydrolase activity, acting on ester bonds; aspartoacylase activity; aminoacylase activity; identical protein binding
Cellular component	nucleus; cytoplasm; cytosol
Biological process	metabolism; cellular amino acid biosynthetic process; aspartate catabolic process; central nervous system myelination; positive regulation of oligodendrocyte differentiation
Sources:Amigo / QuickGO
Orthologs
Databases	NCBI: entry; OMA: entry
Species	Human	Mouse
Entrez	443	11484
Ensembl	ENSG00000108381	ENSMUSG00000020774
UniProt	P45381	Q8R3P0
RefSeq (mRNA)	NM_000049; NM_001128085	NM_023113
RefSeq (protein)	NP_000040; NP_001121557	NP_075602
Location (UCSC)	Chr 17: 3.47 – 3.5 Mb	Chr 11: 73.2 – 73.22 Mb
PubMed search
- Wikidata
View/Edit Human	View/Edit Mouse

Aspartoacylase
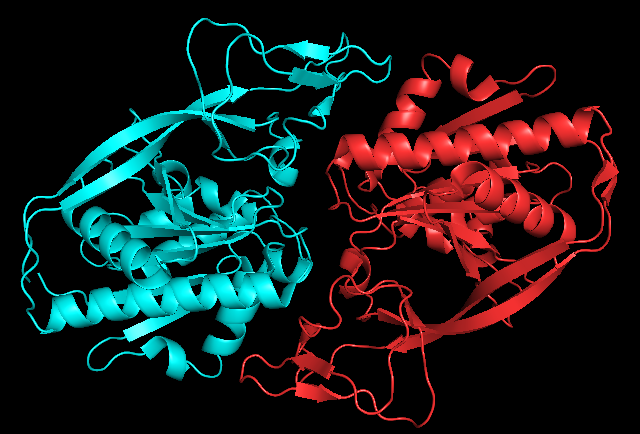
- Structure of aspartoacylase dimer. Generated from 2I3C.

Identifiers
- EC no.: 3.5.1.15

Databases
- BRENDA: enzyme data
- ExPASy: NiceZyme view
- KEGG: enzyme entry
- MetaCyc: metabolic pathway
- Rhea: reactions
- PDB structures: RCSB PDB PDBe PDBsum
Search
- PMC: articles
- PubMed: articles
- NCBI: proteins

Aspartoacylase is a hydrolytic enzyme (EC 3.5.1.15, also called aminoacylase II, ASPA and other names (Note: The enzyme is also known as N-acetylaspartate amidohydrolase, acetyl-aspartic deaminase or acylase II)) that in humans is encoded by the ASPA gene. ASPA catalyzes the deacylation of N-acetyl-l-aspartate (N-acetylaspartate) into aspartate and acetate. It is a zinc-dependent hydrolase that promotes the deprotonation of water to use as a nucleophile in a mechanism analogous to many other zinc-dependent hydrolases. It is most commonly found in the brain, where it controls the levels of N-acetyl-l-aspartate. Mutations that result in loss of aspartoacylase activity are associated with Canavan disease, a rare autosomal recessive neurodegenerative disease.

== Structure ==
Aspartoacylase is a dimer of two identical monomers of 313 amino acids and uses a zinc cofactor in each. There are two distinct domains in each monomer: the N-terminal domain from residues 1-212 and the C-terminal domain from residues 213–313. The N-terminal domain of aspartoacylase is similar to that of zinc-dependent hydrolases such as carboxypeptidaseA. However, carboxypeptidases do not have something similar to the C-domain. In carboxypeptidase A, the active site is accessible to large substrates like the bulky C-terminal residue of polypeptides, whereas the C-domain sterically hinders access to the active site in aspartoacylase. Instead, the N-domain and C-domain of aspartoacylase form a deep narrow channel that leads to the active site.

The zinc cofactor is found at the active site and is held by Glu-24, His-21, and His 116. The substrate is held in place by Arg-63, Asn-70, Arg-71, Tyr-164, Arg-168, and Tyr-288. The zinc cofactor is used to lower the pKa of a ligated water molecule so that an attack on N-acetyl-L-aspartate may occur and to stabilize the resulting tetrahedral intermediate along with Arg-63, and Glu-178.

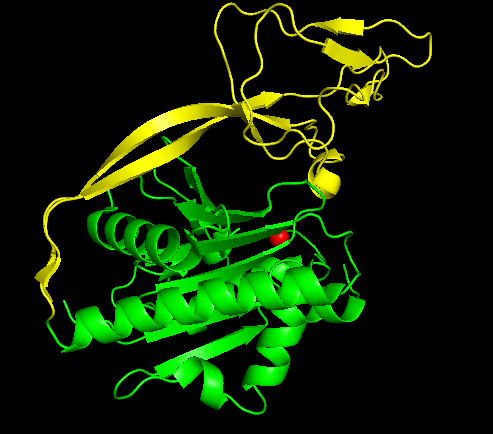
A monomer of aspartoacylase with the N-domain in green, C-domain in yellow, and zinc cofactor in red. Generated from 2I3C.

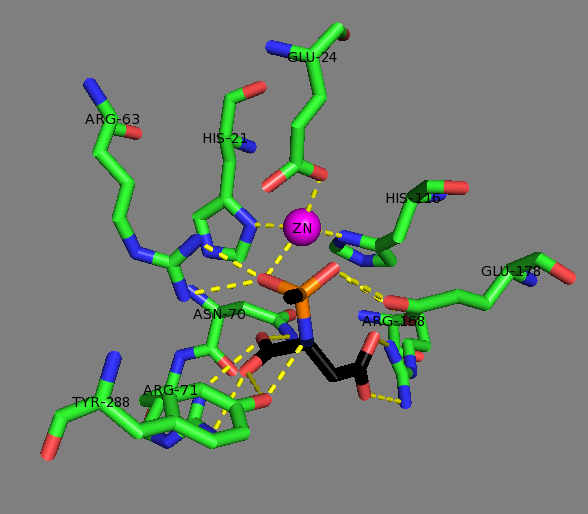
Active site of aspartoacylase with a bound N-phosphonamidate-L-aspartate. This is a tetrahedral intermediate analogue with phosphorus replacing the attacked carbon. In the structure, zinc, Arg-63, and Glu-178 are stabilizing the tetrahedral intermediate. Generated from 2O4H.

== Mechanism ==
There are two types of possible mechanisms for zinc-dependent hydrolases depending on what is the nucleophile. The first uses deprotonated water and the second attacks with an aspartate or glutamate first forming an anhydride. Aspartoacylase follows the deprotonated water mechanism. Zinc lowers the pKa of a ligated water molecule and the reaction proceeds via an attack on N-acetyl-l-aspartate when the water molecule is deprotonated by Glu-178. This leads to a tetrahedral intermediate that is stabilized by the zinc, Arg-63, and Glu-178. Finally, the carbonyl is then reformed, the bond with nitrogen is broken, and the nitrogen is protonated by the proton taken by Glu-178 all in one concerted step.

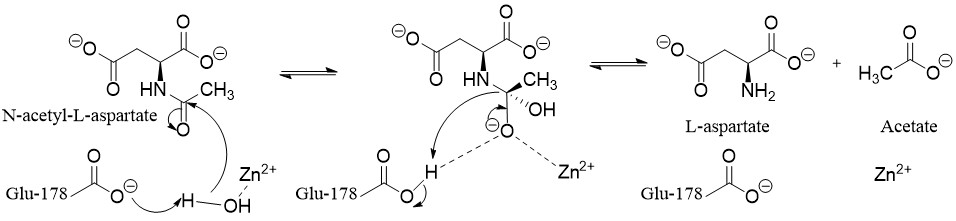
Aspartoacylase mechanism. All the coordinating residues are not shown for clarity.

== Biological function ==
Aspartoacylase is used to metabolize N-acetyl-L-aspartate by catalyzing its deacylation. Aspartoacylase prevents the buildup of N-acetyl-L-aspartate in the brain. It is believed that controlling N-acetyl-L-aspartate levels is essential for developing and maintaining white matter. It is not known why so much N-acetyl-L-aspartate is produced in the brain nor what its primary function is. However, one hypothesis is that it is potentially used as a chemical reservoir that can be tapped into for acetate for acetyl-CoA synthesis or aspartate for glutamate synthesis. This way, N-acetyl-L-aspartate can be used to transport these precursor molecules and aspartoacylase is used to release them. For example, N-acetyl-L-aspartate produced in neurons can be transported into oligodendrocytes and the acetate released can be used for myelin synthesis. Another hypothesis is that N-acetyl-L-aspartate is essential osmolyte that acts as a molecular water pump that helps maintain a proper fluid balance in the brain.

== Disease relevance ==
Mutations that lead to loss of aspartoacylase activity have been identified as the cause of Canavan disease. Canavan disease is a rare autosomal recessive disorder that causes spongy degeneration of the white matter in the brain and severe psychomotor retardation, usually leading to death at a young age. The loss of aspartoacylase activity leads to the buildup of N-acetyl-L-aspartate in the brain and an increase in urine concentration by up to 60 times normal levels. Though the exact mechanism of how loss of aspartoacylase activity leads to Canavan disease is not fully understood, there are two primary competing explanations. The first is that it leads to defective myelin synthesis due to a deficiency of acetyl-CoA derived from the acetate product. Another explanation is that the elevated levels of N-acetyl-l-aspartate interfere with its normal brain osmoregulatory mechanism leading to osmotic disequilibrium.

There are over 70 reported mutations of this enzyme, but the most common ones are the amino acid substitutions E285A and A305E. E285A reduces activity of aspartoacylase down to as low as 0.3% of its normal function and is found in 98% of cases with Ashkenazi Jewish ancestry. The mutation A305E is found in about 40% of non-Jewish patients and reduces activity to about 10%. Of these two mutations, a crystal structure of the E285A mutant has been taken, showing that the loss of the hydrogen bonding from glutamate leads to a conformational change that distorts the active site and alters the substrate binding, leading to the much lower catalytic activity.

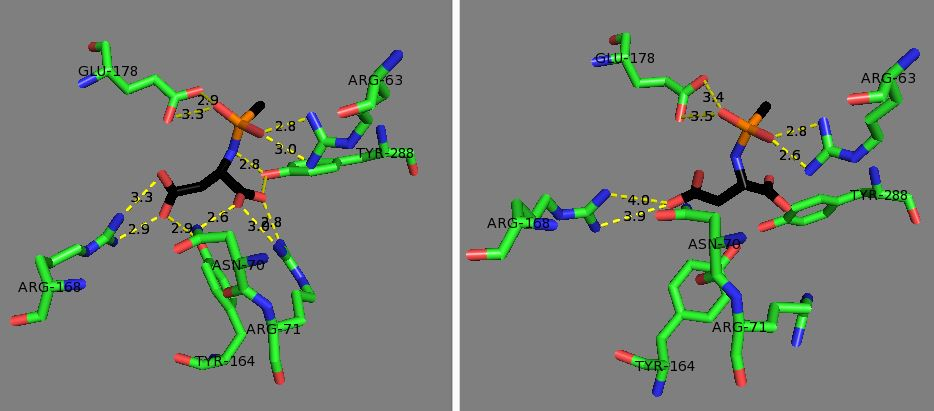
Distortion of the active site caused by the E285A mutation. Wild type ASPA is on the left (2O4H) and E285A on the right (4NFR).

== See also ==
- Aspartic acid
- Neurodegeneration
- Enzyme deficiency
