= Galactosylceramidase =

Mammalian protein found in Homo sapiens

Identifiers
- EC no.: 3.2.1.46
- CAS no.: 9027-89-8

Databases
- BRENDA: enzyme data
- ExPASy: NiceZyme view
- KEGG: enzyme entry
- MetaCyc: metabolic pathway
- Rhea: reactions
- PDB structures: RCSB PDB PDBe PDBsum
- Gene Ontology: AmiGO / QuickGO
Search
- PMC: articles
- PubMed: articles
- NCBI: proteins

Galactosylceramidase (or galactocerebrosidase), EC 3.2.1.46, is an enzyme that removes galactose from ceramide derivatives (galactosylceramides) by catalysing the hydrolysis of galactose ester bonds of galactosylceramide, galactosylsphingosine, lactosylceramide, and monogalactosyldiglyceride.

It is a lysosomal protein, encoded in humans by the GALC gene. Mutations in this gene have been associated with Krabbe disease, also known as galactosylceramide lipidosis.
