= Krabbe disease =

- Other names: Globoid cell leukodystrophy; Galactosylceramide lipidosis; GALC deficiency; Galactocerebrosidase deficiency
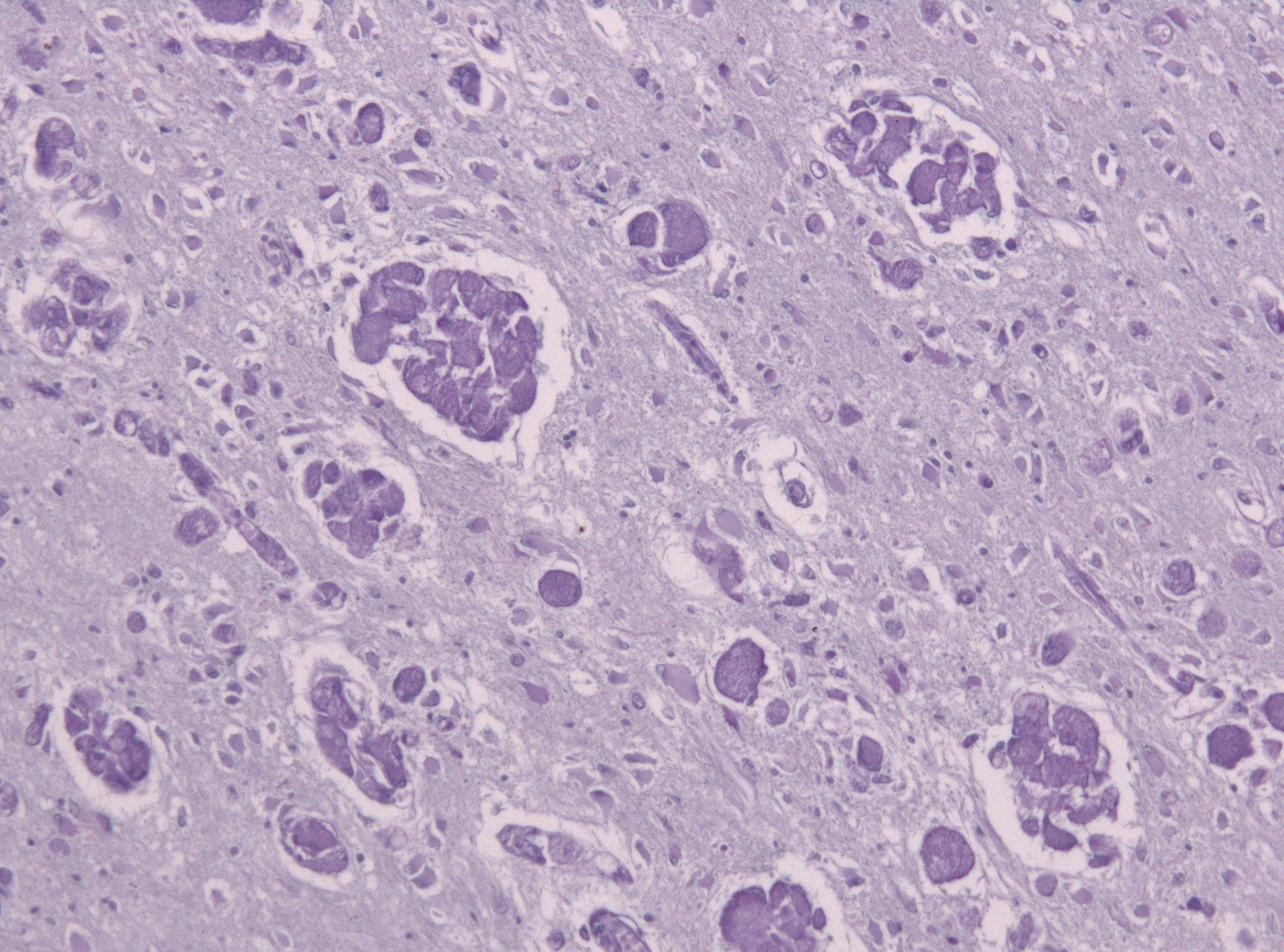
- A histopathology slide of a brain with Krabbe disease showing giant cells with PAS stain inclusions ("globoid cells") within astrocytic gliosis and loss of myelinated fibers.
- Specialty: Metabolic disorder
- Symptoms: Infancy: Developmental delay, irritability, spasticity, hypotonia, microcephaly, optic atrophy; Juvenile: Muscle weakness, vision loss, developmental regression; Adult: Burning paresthesias in extremities, loss of manual dexterity, muscle weakness, sensory neuropathy, muscle atrophy
- Usual onset: Within 3 to 6 months of birth, but can present in childhood or even adulthood
- Types: Infantile, juvenile and adult
- Causes: Mutation of GALC gene
- Risk factors: Parents who are heterozygous (only one copy) for the mutation to the GALC gene
- Diagnostic method: Histopathology, genetic testing
- Prevention: Prenatal diagnosis and screening of at-risk couples
- Treatment: Symptomatic and supportive treatment only, but stem cell transplantation may be beneficial
- Prognosis: One-, two-, and three-year survival rates of 60%, 26%, and 14%, respectively
- Frequency: 0.005%

Krabbe disease (KD) (also known as globoid cell leukodystrophy or galactosylceramide lipidosis) is a rare and often fatal lysosomal storage disease that results in progressive damage to the nervous system. KD involves dysfunctional metabolism of sphingolipids and is inherited in an autosomal recessive pattern. The disease is named after Danish neurologist Knud Krabbe (1885–1961). It is caused by mutations in the GALC gene, which cause a deficiency of the enzyme galactosylceramidase. Most cases present in infancy and result in progressive neurologic deterioration and death before the age of two.

== Signs and symptoms ==
Symptoms in asymptomatic infantile-onset (less than 12 months after birth) and later-onset Krabbe disease present themselves differently. Of individuals with infantile-onset KD, 85–90% display progressive neurologic deterioration in infancy and death before the age of two. Symptoms include irritability, fevers, limb stiffness, seizures, feeding difficulties (like gastroesophageal reflux disease), vomiting, staring episodes, and slowing of mental and motor development. In the first stages of the disease, doctors often mistake the symptoms for those of cerebral palsy. Other symptoms include muscle weakness, spasticity, deafness, optic atrophy, optic nerve enlargement, blindness, paralysis, and difficulty when swallowing. Prolonged weight loss may also occur.

About 10–15% of individuals with later-onset KD have a much slower disease progression. These individuals may also display symptoms such as esotropia, slurred speech, and slow development or loss of motor milestones.

== Causes ==
Autosomal recessive inheritance pattern as seen in Krabbe disease

Krabbe disease is caused by mutations in the GALC gene located on chromosome 14 (14q31), which is inherited in an autosomal recessive manner. Mutations in the GALC gene cause a deficiency of the enzyme galactosylceramidase (GALC). In rare cases, it may be caused by a lack of active saposin A (a derivative of prosaposin).

The buildup of unmetabolized lipids adversely affects the growth of the nerve's protective myelin sheath (the covering that insulates many nerves) resulting in demyelination and severe progressive degeneration of motor skills. As part of a group of disorders known as leukodystrophies, KD results from the imperfect growth and development of myelin.

Galactosylceramidase deficiency also results in a buildup of the glycosphingolipid psychosine, which is toxic to oligodendrocytes, a type of non-neuronal cells found in the nervous system, collectively termed neuroglia.

== Diagnosis ==
A few ways to help pinpoint the presence of Krabbe disease are known. Newborn screening for KD includes assaying dried blood cells for GALC enzyme activity and molecular analysis for evidence of GALC enzyme mutations. Infants displaying low enzyme activity and/or enzyme mutations should be referred for additional diagnostic testing and neurological examination. Up to 5% GALC enzyme activity is observed in all symptomatic individuals with Krabbe disease. High concentration of psychosine in dried blood spots may also be identified as a marker for KD. A 2011 study discovered that individuals with KD, more so in later-onset individuals, tend to have an abnormal increase in CSF protein concentration.

The disease may be diagnosed by its characteristic grouping of certain cells (multinucleated globoid cells), nerve demyelination and degeneration, and destruction of brain cells. Special stains for myelin (e.g., luxol fast blue) may be used to aid diagnosis.

New York, Missouri, and Kentucky include KD in their newborn screening panel. Indiana started screening in 2020.

== Treatment ==
Although no cure for Krabbe disease is known, bone marrow transplantation and hematopoietic stem cell transplantation (HSCT) have been shown to benefit cases early in the course of the disease. Generally, treatment for the disorder is symptomatic and supportive. Physical therapy may help maintain or increase muscle tone and circulation.

A 15-year study on the developmental outcomes of children with KD who underwent HSCT in the first seven weeks after birth found that patients have a better prognosis for both lifespan and functionality, with a slower disease progression. Even symptomatic individuals with later-onset Krabbe disease may benefit from HSCT if diagnosed early enough. Umbilical-cord blood is typically used as the source for the transplant stem cells. Clinical trials for gene therapy are currently enrolling patients.

=== Management ===
Symptom management can be particularly difficult for individuals with infantile-onset KD, as symptoms tend to progress rapidly. Because no treatment is available for KD, management of the condition is typically supportive and aimed at alleviating symptoms. Frequent evaluation is encouraged to anticipate the onset of and preparation for certain symptoms. Physical therapy can help to alleviate motor difficulties and increase strength, mobility, and flexibility.

Gastrostomy tubes are used to circumvent feeding difficulties and prevent aspiration. A simultaneous gastrostomy tube insertion and Nissen fundoplication procedure is commonly performed to prevent the need for a secondary surgical procedure. Individuals with KD with severe motor deficits tend to be more susceptible to overfeeding, as they require less calorie consumption, thus consuming fewer calories than caretakers may expect. Also, some evidence indicates that routine vaccines may accelerate disease progression; many individuals with KD tend to not follow traditional vaccination procedures.

== Prognosis ==
In infantile Krabbe disease, death usually occurs in early childhood. A 2011 study found one-, two-, and three-year survival rates of 60%, 26%, and 14%, respectively, with a few surviving longer. Patients with late-onset Krabbe disease tend to have a slower disease progression and live significantly longer.

== Epidemiology ==
This disease also impacts other animals such as monkeys, mice, and dogs. While certain gene deletions are more frequent than others, novel mutations resulting in Krabbe disease have been discovered worldwide. Most commonly, the underlying cause of the disease is a deletion of a GALC gene, which causes a deficiency in the GALC enzyme. This is the circumstance in 80% of patients who have European and Mexican origins. The mortality rate of early-infantile KD is 90% before age two. Later onset of symptoms is associated with longer life expectancy, with older children generally surviving two to seven years after the initial diagnosis.

Krabbe disease occurs in about one in 100,000 births. Because the disease is genetic, incidence rates vary between populations. The incidence rate is lower in Japan with between five and ten cases per 1,000,000 live births. In the United States, KD occurs in about one of every 100,000 live births. Scandinavian countries report incidence rates of two in 100,000 births. KD in the Druze community in Israel has an incidence rate of six hundred in 100,000 live births, thought to be due in part to a high frequency of consanguineous marriages. Almost 35% of all Druze marriages were found to be between first-cousin familial relations. No cases of KD have been reported among the Jewish community.

The time of onset also varies in frequency by location. Early infantile KD is the most common form of the disease overall, but Nordic communities tend to have even higher rates of early-infantile onset KD, while Southern European countries have higher incidences of late-onset cases. Estimating the incidence of adult-onset KD is difficult due to discrepancies in classifying cases as late-onset versus adult-onset.

== Society and culture ==
Former Buffalo Bills quarterback Jim Kelly has attracted recognition and research funding for Krabbe disease following the diagnosis of his son, Hunter, in 1997. Hunter Kelly died of the disease on August 5, 2005, at the age of eight. They created Hunter's Hope, a foundation that seeks to advance newborn screening, research, and treatments, and provides support to families of leukodystrophy children.

In 2016, Cove Ellis, a child from Georgia, United States, was diagnosed with the disease. Her family and local community has worked to raise awareness of the disease and helped pass "Cove's Law".

== Other animals ==
Krabbe disease is found in mice and may also be found in cats and dogs, particularly the West Highland White Terriers and Cairn Terriers.

== See also ==
- Maria Luisa Escolar
- The Myelin Project
- The Stennis Foundation
