= Odone =

Odone is a surname and given name. Notable people with the name include:

- Augusto and Michaela Odone, inventors of Lorenzo's oil, a treatment for ALD
- Cristina Odone (born 1960), Italian-British journalist, editor, and writer
- Giannettino Odone (1626–1698), Doge of the Republic of Genoa and king of Corsica
- Lorenzo Odone (1978–2008), American adrenoleukodystrophy (ALD) patient whose parents sought a treatment for the disease
- Odone Belluzzi (1892–1956), Italian engineer
