= Lorenzo's Oil =

1992 drama film directed by George Miller

- Theatrical release poster
- Directed by: George Miller
- Written by: George Miller; Nick Enright
- Produced by: Doug Mitchell; George Miller
- Starring: Nick Nolte; Susan Sarandon; Peter Ustinov; Zack O'Malley Greenburg
- Cinematography: John Seale
- Edited by: Richard Francis-Bruce; Marcus D'Arcy
- Music by: Stewart Copeland
- Production company: Kennedy Miller
- Distributed by: Universal Pictures
- Release dates: December 30, 1992 (United States); February 26, 1993 (United Kingdom)
- Running time: 125 minutes
- Countries: Australia; United States
- Languages: English; Italian
- Budget: $30 million
- Box office: $7.2 million

Lorenzo's Oil is a 1992 drama film directed and co-written by George Miller. It is based on the true story of Augusto and Michaela Odone (played by Nick Nolte and Susan Sarandon), parents who search for a cure for their son Lorenzo's (played by Zack O'Malley Greenburg) adrenoleukodystrophy (ALD), leading to the development of Lorenzo's oil. The film was shot in Pittsburgh, Pennsylvania, primarily from September 1991 to February 1992.

It had a limited release in North America on December 30, 1992, with a nationwide release on January 15, 1993. Though it was a box office disappointment, grossing $7.2 million against its $30 million budget, the film was generally well received by critics and garnered two nominations at the 65th Academy Awards.

== Plot ==
Lorenzo is a bright and vibrant young boy living in the Comoro Islands, as his father Augusto Odone works for the World Bank and is stationed there. However, after relocating with his parents to the United States, he begins to show signs of neurological problems, such as falling, loss of hearing, tantrums, etc. The boy is diagnosed as having adrenoleukodystrophy (ALD), which is fatal within two years.

Failing to find a doctor capable of treating their son's rare disease, Augusto and his wife, Michaela, set out on a mission to find a treatment to save their son. In their quest, the Odones clash with doctors, scientists, and a support group that is skeptical that anything could be done about ALD, much less by laypeople. But they persist, setting up camp in medical libraries, reviewing animal experiments, enlisting the aid of Professor Gus Nikolais, badgering researchers, questioning top doctors all over the world, and even organizing an international symposium about the disease.

Despite research dead-ends, the horror of watching their son's health decline, and being surrounded by skeptics (including the coordinators of the support group they attend), they persist until they finally hit upon a possible therapy. The Odones sponsor an international meeting of scientists doing research on ALD, requiring two conditions ahead of time. First, they insist that the meeting focus on potential treatments and, second, they require that they be allowed to participate, despite being non-scientist laypeople.

The pivotal scene in the movie portrays this meeting, in which the scientists are presenting their research. When Dr. William B. Rizzo mentions his studies in which the addition of oleic acid to cultured cells blocked accumulation of the factors which cause ALD, the Odones jump into the conversation, asking if this oil might help their son. Although the scientists play down their hope, pointing out that it would take years of work to produce the oil and test in clinical trials, the Odones seize the promise of this possible curative treatment.

As the scene ends, Michaela Odone is shown beginning the effort to find someone able and willing to produce the same oil Dr. Rizzo gave to his cells. They obtain oleic acid from an industrial manufacturer of lubricants, but this only lowers Lorenzo's levels by 50% before leveling off, and they realize they are only countering some of the shorter chains produced by one enzyme. To remove the other, they will have to add a distillation of erucic acid. They contact over 100 firms around the world until they find an elderly British chemist, Don Suddaby, who is working for Croda International and is willing to take on the challenge of distilling the proper formula.

The Odones obtain a precious vial of the oil (actually containing two specific long chain fatty acids, isolated from rapeseed oil and olive oil) and add it to their son's diet. This treatment proves successful in normalizing the accumulation of the very long chain fatty acids (which had been causing their son's steady decline), as measured in blood levels. This treatment halts the progression of his disease and is dubbed "Lorenzo's Oil." This oil is soon found to be successful in preventing the progression of harm in other patients with ALD.

Meanwhile, Lorenzo has a great deal of neurological damage, and the Odones are dismayed to see that the oil can reverse their son's symptoms only very, very slowly. The Odones realize that more rapid improvement of their son's severe condition will require treatments to repair the myelin sheath (a lipid insulator) around the nerves, and Augusto is shown taking on the new challenge of organizing biomedical efforts to heal myelin damage in patients.

Lorenzo, at the age of 14, shows definite improvement (swallowing for himself and answering "yes" or "no" questions by blinking) and it is revealed that he has regained his sight, can move his head from side to side, vocalize simple sounds, and is learning to use a computer. The movie ends with scenes of ALD patients who were treated with Lorenzo's Oil earlier in the course of their disease. In these patients, the devastating neurological degeneration from which Lorenzo suffered was prevented.

== Cast ==
- Nick Nolte as Augusto Odone
- Susan Sarandon as Michaela Odone
- Peter Ustinov as Professor Gus Nikolais
- Kathleen Wilhoite as Deirdre Murphy
- Gerry Bamman as Doctor Judalon
- Margo Martindale as Wendy Gimble
- James Rebhorn as Ellard Muscatine
- Ann Hearn as Loretta Muscatine
- Maduka Steady as Omouri
- Don Suddaby as himself
- Zack O'Malley Greenburg as Lorenzo Odone
- Rocco Sisto as Murphy Family
- Carmen Piccini as Cristina Odone
- Mary Wakio as Comorian Teacher
- Colin Ward as Jake Gimble
- La Tanya Richardson as Nurse Ruth
- Jennifer Dundas as Nurse Nancy Jo
- William Cameron as Pellerman
- Peter Mackenzie as Immunosuppression Doctor
- Laura Linney as Young Teacher
- Elizabeth Daily as vocal effects for Lorenzo
- Eliot Brinton as William B. Rizzo, original discoverer of Lorenzo's oil

== Production ==
Principal photography for Lorenzo's Oil began on September 9, 1991, in the Pittsburgh suburb of Ben Avon, Pennsylvania and continued throughout the city and area.

Possibly to emphasize the "everyman" aspect of the plot (the notion that a cure could affect families and individuals anywhere), many smaller roles were played by inexperienced actors or non-actors with unusual physical features and mannerisms. For example, the poet James Merrill was noticed by a casting director at a New York public reading of his poetry. His rarefied speaking cadences were used in a symposium scene in which he played a questioning doctor.

=== Music ===
The film uses Allegri's Miserere, Edward Elgar's cello concerto, as well as Barber's Adagio for Strings and Mozart's Ave verum corpus K.618.

The opening song is "Kijana Mwana Mwali" (Swahili, "Song about a Young Lady"), sung by the Gonda Traditional Entertainers.

A 1960 recording of Maria Callas with the La Scala orchestra and chorus is heard singing selections from Bellini's Norma at several points.

The music for the Easter Midnight Mass scene is a Russian Orthodox Church hymn, "Bogoroditse Devo" (Rejoice, O Virgin) from "Three Choruses from 'Tsar Feodor Ioannovich'", taken from the album Sacred Songs of Russia by Gloriae Dei Cantores.

Other music include Barber's Agnus Dei and Mahler's Symphony No. 5.

The original music from the motion picture soundtrack was scored and composed by Stewart Copeland.

== Reception ==
=== Critical response ===
Roger Ebert of the Chicago Sun-Times gave the film four out of four stars and called it an "immensely moving and challenging movie", adding that "it was impossible not to get swept up in it." James Berardinelli of ReelViews gave it three out of four stars and claimed, "it was about the war for knowledge and the victory of hope through perseverance."

Review aggregation website Rotten Tomatoes retrospectively collected reviews from 40 critics to give the film a score of 93%, with an average rating of 7.10/10, as of May 2023. The website's consensus reads, "A harrowing tribute to the heroism of parental love, Lorenzo's Oil is kept from abject misery by George Miller's sensitive direction and outstanding performances from Nick Nolte and Susan Sarandon." On Metacritic, the film has a weighted average score of 80 out of 100, based on 21 critics, indicating "generally favorable" reviews. Audiences polled by CinemaScore gave the film a grade of "A" on an A+ to F scale.

=== Medical response ===
Though the film seemed to accurately portray the events related to the boy's condition and his parents' efforts during the time period covered by the film, it was criticized for falsely painting a picture of a miracle cure. Subsequent research with Lorenzo's oil has not clearly proven its long-term effectiveness in treating ALD after its onset. However, it prevented the onset of ALD in two-thirds of the susceptible boys. The actual subject of the film, Lorenzo Odone, died of pneumonia in May 2008 at the age of 30, having lived two decades longer than originally predicted by doctors.

Hugo Moser, on whom the character of Professor Nikolais was based, called the film's portrayal of him "an abomination".

=== Box office ===
The film grossed $7,286,388 domestically with a budget of around $30 million.

=== Accolades ===
Award	Category	Nominee(s)	Result	Ref.
Academy Awards	Best Actress	Susan Sarandon	Nominated	
Academy Awards	Best Screenplay – Written Directly for the Screen	George Miller and Nick Enright	Nominated	
Chicago Film Critics Association Awards	Best Actress	Susan Sarandon	Nominated	
Golden Globe Awards	Best Actress in a Motion Picture – Drama	Susan Sarandon	Nominated	
National Society of Film Critics Awards	Best Actress	Susan Sarandon	2nd Place	
New York Film Critics Circle Awards	Best Actress	Susan Sarandon	Runner-up	
Writers Guild of America Awards	Best Screenplay – Written Directly for the Screen	George Miller and Nick Enright	Nominated	

== See also ==
- Voglia di vivere (film), a 1990 Italian television film depicting the same story.
- "Lorenzo", a song by Phil Collins, released on the 1996 album Dance into the Light, is based on a poem Michaela Odone wrote about Lorenzo.
- Extraordinary Measures, a 2010 film depicting the true story of another set of parents' struggle to find a cure for their children's rare disease.
