= Kennedy Krieger Institute =

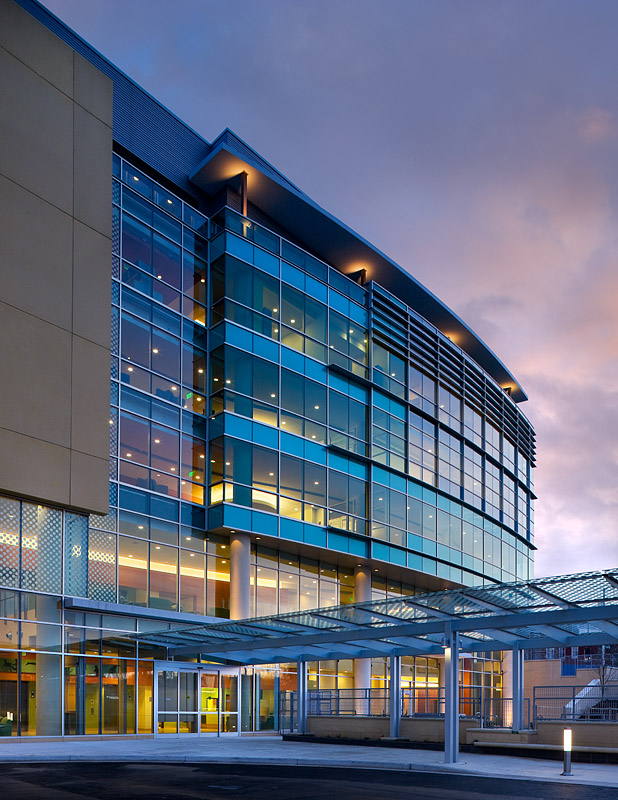
- Outpatient Center

Geography
- Location: Baltimore, Maryland, United States
- Coordinates: 39.299553°N 76.594262°W

Organization
- Care system: Non-profit organization
- Type: Specialist
- Affiliated university: Johns Hopkins Children's Center

Services
- Standards: JCAHO accreditation, CARF accreditation, Maryland State Department of Education
- Emergency department: No
- Speciality: Pediatric, Rehabilitation, Developmental disabilities, brain disorders, spinal cord injury, musculoskeletal system

History
- Founded: 1937

Links
- Website: www.kennedykrieger.org
- Lists: Hospitals in Maryland

The Kennedy Krieger Institute (/ˈkriːɡər/) is a nonprofit, 501(c)(3) tax-exempt, Johns Hopkins Hospital affiliate located in Baltimore, Maryland, that provides in-patient and out-patient medical care, community services, and school-based programs for children and adolescents with learning disabilities, as well as disorders of the brain, spinal cord, and musculoskeletal system. The Institute provides services for children with developmental concerns mild to severe and is involved in research of various disorders, including new interventions and earlier diagnosis.

Bradley Schlaggar is CEO of the Kennedy Krieger Institute.

== History ==
The Kennedy Krieger Institute opened in 1937 when Winthrop Phelps, an orthopedic surgeon from Baltimore, responded to a dire need for treatment for individuals with cerebral palsy. Phelps founded the Children's Rehabilitation Institute, the first treatment facility in the country dedicated solely to children with cerebral palsy. The institute was renamed the Kennedy Institute in 1968 in memory of President John F. Kennedy who enacted the Medical Training Act during his administration, to protect the rights and improve the lives of persons with disabilities. In 1992, the name was changed again to Kennedy Krieger to honor original board member and long-time supporter, Zanvyl Krieger.

Since it has opened, Kennedy Krieger Institute has evolved into an international resource for children with diverse brain-related disorders, from mild learning disabilities to rare genetic disorders. Kennedy Krieger provides medical care and schooling, in addition to its involvement in research.

In February 2026, the hospital announced it will be expanding with a $250 million, 10-story care center in East Baltimore.

== Core areas of focus ==
=== Patient care ===
Kennedy Krieger treats more than 19,000 children annually. The Institute practices early identification, intervention, and treatment of disabilities to maximize potential and to prevent major problems throughout a child's life.

=== Research ===
Kennedy Krieger scientists research to prevent and cure pediatric neurological disorders, spinal cord injuries and developmental disabilities. The institute's work has yielded answers that are improving the treatment and care of children with conditions such as autism, cerebral palsy and spina bifida. A team of international scientists and investigators at Kennedy Krieger is working to isolate culprit genes and develop new treatment models and therapies. The institute has a swift transfer of research to patient care. The institute received a $1.5 million grant in early 2010 to perform brain cancer research.

=== Special education ===
The Kennedy Krieger School is for children ages 6 to 21 with a wide range of learning, emotional, physical, neurological and developmental disabilities. Education occurs in a variety of day-school settings and in partnership settings within public schools. The goal of Kennedy Krieger Institute's Department of Special Education is to provide special education and related services to children with disabilities in a variety of school-based, hospital-based and recreational settings.

=== Community programs ===
The Maryland Center for Developmental Disabilities at Kennedy Krieger Institute focuses on professional training, community service, research, and information dissemination.

=== Professional training ===
In addition to the other core areas of focus, Kennedy Krieger also provides training opportunities to increase the number of qualified specialists in the field of neurological and developmental disabilities. Each year, more than 400 individuals come to Kennedy Krieger to train with experts in many fields, including audiology, pediatrics, and nursing. The institute also funds the training of the next generation of researchers.

== Lead paint controversy ==
In the 1990s, the Kennedy Krieger Institute's Lead-Based Paint Abatement and Repair and Maintenance Study placed families with young children in apartments where lead paint had not been completely removed in order to study the effects on the children's health. Although the research ethics review board at Johns Hopkins University approved the study, it has been strongly criticised for harming children and targeting African American communities, and was the subject of several court cases, including one where a sibling of an enrolled participant was awarded $1.84 million in damages.

== Scientific breakthroughs ==
=== Adrenoleukodystrophy ===
Adrenoleukodystrophy (ALD) is a rare genetic disorder of the brain that occurs only in males. The fatal condition destroys the nervous system, often leaving the victim unable to walk, and talk normally. For many years ALD took the lives of many and continues to do so today. In 1987, Augusto and Michaela Odone, parents of a child affected by ALD, invented Lorenzo's oil as a treatment for the disease. Their story was in the 1992 Universal Studios motion picture, Lorenzo's Oil, starring Nick Nolte and Susan Sarandon. Hugo Moser, a scientist at Kennedy Krieger Institute, joined forces with the Odone's, ultimately proving that their treatment, Lorenzo's oil, can prevent the onset of ALD if begun before neurological symptoms appear. Moser and colleagues also created the first diagnostic test for ALD, as well as a newborn screening test that can detect the disease from birth. On January 20, 2007, Dr. Hugo Moser died of complications from surgery to treat pancreatic cancer. In 2008, Moser’s wife helped to launch a pilot study to screen for ALD in 5,000 newborns born in local Baltimore hospitals, the results of which will be used to advocate for nationwide newborn screening for this disorder.

=== Autism ===
Autism spectrum disorders (ASDs) are a large focus of the institute's research and clinical programs. Autism is typically diagnosed by age three, however the institute's research is focused on detecting signs of the disorder even earlier. One of the researchers focusing on autism today is Dr. Rebecca Landa, Director of the Center for Autism & Related Disorders at Kennedy Krieger. Landa has discovered that some babies begin to show risk factors for autism as early as 14 months of age. Her work also focuses on developing early intervention models for toddlers with autism that help to improve a child's social, language, and cognitive skills. Kennedy Krieger runs the Interactive Autism Network, an online national autism registry, launched in 2007.

=== Spinal cord injury ===
Spinal cord injury (SCI) causes damage to nerve roots and fibers that carry messages to and from the brain. Spinal cord injuries can result from physical trauma, tumors, developmental disorders or a number of different diseases. In 1995, Christopher Reeve, known for his role in all three Superman movies, was thrown from his horse and landed headfirst into a fence shattering his first and second vertebrae. Reeve's cervical spinal injury paralyzed him from the neck down. Reeve sought the aid of John McDonald, who was working at Washington University School of Medicine. After extensive activity-based therapies, Reeve was able to wiggle his toes and move a couple of fingers. Reeve died in 2004; however, his achievements shined light on everyone affected by spinal cord injuries. McDonald left St. Louis and officially opened the International Center for Spinal Cord Injury (ICSCI) at Kennedy Krieger Institute on June 14, 2005. ICSCI is one of the first centers to have a focus specifically on children with chronic spinal cord injuries and paralysis. The center utilizes innovative activity-based therapies such as FES cycling, aquatic therapy, and partial weight supported walking to help patients regain sensation and feeling in their bodies. The center combines clinical research with a focus on restoration and rehabilitation for children and adults with chronic paralysis.

=== Schooling/special education ===
==== Kennedy Krieger Lower/Middle School ====
The Kennedy Krieger Lower/Middle School located at the Fairmount campus in Baltimore serves students in grades pre-K through 8. The school's preschool is a full day program focusing on the core deficits of autism for children ages 3–5. Students in the elementary and middle grades are carefully grouped for instruction that is aligned with national standards and guided by the Maryland College and Career Readiness Standards.

==== Kennedy Krieger High School (KKHS) ====
The Kennedy Krieger High School is a special education day program on the Greenspring campus in Baltimore, serving more than 200 students aged 14–21. The children come from many Maryland school districts, the District of Columbia and from neighboring states to enroll in either 10 or 11 month programs. Industry training and work-based learning is emphasized for all students, who can graduate with either a Maryland high school diploma or a certificate of completion.

==== Kennedy Krieger School LEAP Program ====
The Kennedy Krieger School LEAP Program (Life skills and Education for Students with Autism and other Pervasive Behavioral Challenges) serves students with severe autism in a 12-month day program. LEAP consists of a maximum of 65 students in 9 different classrooms and has a 1:1 staff to student ratio.

==== Powder Mill campus ====
The Powder Mill campus of Kennedy Krieger School opened in 2007 at the request of Montgomery County Public Schools and later relocated to neighboring Prince George’s County. It primarily serves students with autism spectrum disorders. Students in grades 3-8 are on a high school diploma track, while students aged 11–21 can work towards a certificate of completion.

==== Southern Maryland campus ====
The Southern Maryland campus of Kennedy Krieger School opened in autumn 2023 in California, Maryland. It serves students in grades K-8 who are working toward a high school diploma and students aged 5–21 who are seeking a certificate of completion. It is a nonpublic special education day program that operates on an 11-month program schedule.

== Presidents/CEOs ==
- Dr. Bradley Schlaggar (2018–present)
- Dr. Gary Goldstein (1988–2018)
- Dr. Hugo Moser (1976–1988)
- Dr. Matthew Debuskey (1975–1976)
- Dr. Robert Haslam (1970–1975)
- Dr. Frederick Richardson (1967–1969)
- Dr. Winthrop Phelps (1937–1967)
