= Ann B. Moser =

American biochemist

- Born: 1940 (age 85–86); Wakefield, Massachusetts, U.S.
- Other name: Ann Boody Moser
- Education: Radcliffe College
- Spouse: Hugo Moser (m. 1963; died 2007)
- Scientific career
- Fields: Biochemistry, neurology
- Workplaces: Johns Hopkins University; Kennedy Krieger Institute

Ann Boody Moser (born 1940) is an American biochemist specializing in neurology. She researches the development of therapies for adrenoleukodystrophy. Moser is an associate professor emerita in neurology at the Johns Hopkins University. She is a research associate in neurology and the co-director of the peroxisomal diseases laboratory at the Kennedy Krieger Institute.

== Life ==
Moser was born in 1940 in Wakefield, Massachusetts. Moser completed a B.A. in biochemistry from Radcliffe College in 1961. As an undergraduate, she was a technician in Konrad Emil Bloch's laboratory. Moser completed an honors thesis under Bloch's guidance. Moser met her future husband, Hugo Moser at the radioactivity counter while they were working in Manfred L. Karnovsky's laboratory in the department of biological chemistry at Harvard Medical School. Several years later, Hugo interviewed and hired Moser for a position in his laboratory at McLean Hospital. They married in December 1963 and she continued researching sulfate metabolism. She was the first to identify cholesterol sulfate in the human brain.

She joined the Kennedy Krieger Institute (KKI) in 1976 as a senior technician. In 1982, she was promoted to assistant in neurology. In the 1980s, Moser and her husband were developing a screening technique to detect adrenoleukodystrophy. In 1992, she became a research associate in neurology. Moser serves as the co-director of the peroxisomal diseases laboratory in the Hugo W. Research Institute at KKI. By 1999, Moser was elected a full member of the American Society for Neurochemistry. In 2017, she was appointed as an associate professor of neurology in the department of neurogenetics at Johns Hopkins University. She is an associate professor emerita in neurology.
