= The Myelin Project =

1989–2019 American nonprofit organization

The Myelin Project was a 501(c)(3) nonprofit organization established in 1989 by Augusto Odone and his wife, Michaela and their friend Patti Chapman. Their son, Lorenzo, suffered from adrenoleukodystrophy (ALD), the most common of the leukodystrophies. The story of the Odones' struggle was dramatized in the 1992 Hollywood film Lorenzo's Oil, starring actors Nick Nolte, Susan Sarandon and Peter Ustinov. After 20 years, the Myelin Project was merged into another organization called ALD Connect in July 2019.

The Myelin Project had three branches, in the United States, Germany, and the United Kingdom. Its scientific advisory committee included researchers from Yale University and the University of Wisconsin–Madison in the United States, the Istituto Superiore di Sanità and San Raffaele Hospital in Italy, the Hôpital de la Salpêtrière and the Institute Pasteur in France, Queen's University at Kingston in Canada, the University of Cambridge and University of Edinburgh in the United Kingdom, and the Max-Planck-Institut in Germany.

== The project's aims ==
The Myelin Project aimed to advance research, advocacy, and family support for ALD and adrenomyeloneuropathy (AMN).

The nonprofit was run by a president and board of directors. Patti Chapman, who was the president of the organization during its entire duration and since 2019 has been a board member of ALD Connect, had two brothers die of AMN, and had a son, Michael, born in 1979, who began developing symptoms of AMN in 2005 at the age of 26. Her son died in 2020 (aged 40–41) . She was a personal friend of the Odones and a founding board member of the Myelin Projects.

== See also ==
=== Conditions of interest ===
- Alexander disease
- Canavan disease
- Krabbe disease
- Metachromatic leukodystrophy
- Pelizaeus–Merzbacher disease
- Phenylketonuria
- Refsum disease
- Transverse myelitis
- Multiple sclerosis
- Charcot–Marie–Tooth disease
- Arachnoiditis

=== Treatments investigated ===
- Lorenzo's oil
