= Ottone (name) =

Ottone is an Italian name meaning "owner".

== People with the given name ==
- Ottone di Bonvillano (fl. 1147–1153), Republic of Genoa citizen and colonial administrator
- Ottone Calderari (1730–1803), Italian architect
- Ottone del Carretto (fl. 1179–1237), Italian noble
- Ottone Enrico del Caretto, Marquis of Savona (1629–1685), Holy Roman Empire military commander and political figure
- Saint Ottone Frangipane (1040–1127), Benedictine monk and hermit
- Ottone Hamerani (1694–1768), Italian medallist
- Ottone Morena (fl. 12th century), Italian chronicler
- Ottone Olivieri (fl. 1917–1947), Italian-Yugoslav basketball player
- Ottone Rosai (1895–1957), Italian painter
- Ottone Visconti (1207–1295), archbishop of Milan

== People with the surname ==
- Antonio Ottone (1941–2002), Argentine filmmaker
- Ernesto Ottone (born 1972), Chilean actor and cultural manager

== See also ==
- Ottone (disambiguation)
- Oddone
- Otto
