= Mary Blue =

American neurobiologist

- Education: Cornell College; UTHealth School of Public Health
- Scientific career
- Fields: Neurobiology, computational neurology
- Workplaces: Johns Hopkins School of Medicine; Kennedy Krieger Institute
- Doctoral advisor: John G. Parnavelas

Mary Elizabeth Blue is an American neurobiologist and computational neurologist. She is an associate professor of neurology and neuroscience at the Johns Hopkins School of Medicine and a research scientist in the neuroscience laboratory at Kennedy Krieger Institute.

== Life ==
Blue completed a B.A. in biology, cum laude, from Cornell College in 1977. She earned a Ph.D. in cell biology at the UTHealth School of Public Health in 1982. Her doctoral advisor was John G. Parnavelas. Her dissertation was titled, Synapse formation and maturation in the visual cortex of the rat. Blue conducted postdoctoral research in the departments of cell biology and neuroscience under Mark E. Molliver at the Johns Hopkins School of Medicine from 1982 to 1989.

Blue joined the Hugo W. Moser Research Institute at Kennedy Krieger Institute in 1989 as a research scientist. She joined the Johns Hopkins School of Medicine in 1989 as an instructor in the department of neurology. Blue has served as director of the neurohistology imaging facility at the Kennedy Krieger Institute since 1990. She was promoted to assistant professor in 1992 and associate professor in the department of neurology in 2000. Blue also became an associate professor in the department of neuroscience in 2001. From 2000 to 2002, she was president of the Baltimore chapter of the Society for Neuroscience. Blue researches developmental neuroscience, systems, cognitive, and computational neuroscience, neural circuits, molecular neuroscience, and the neurobiology of disease. Blue and Ali Fatemi manage the animal surgery suite of the Intellectual developmental disabilities research center clinical translational core.
