= Oddone =

Oddone is both a surname and a given name. Notable people with the name include:

== Surname ==
- Frederic Oddone, American judge
- María Elena Oddone, Argentine writer and activist
- Piermaria Oddone (born 1944), Peruvian-American physicist

== Given name ==
- Oddone Frangipane (fl. 1130–1170), Italian noble
- Oddone di Monferrato (died 1251), Italian cardinal
- Prince Oddone, Duke of Montferrat (1846–1866), Italian prince of the Royal House of Savoy

== See also ==
- Odone
- Ottone (disambiguation)
