= Adrenomyeloneuropathy =

Rare inherited neurodegenerative disorder

Adrenomyeloneuropathy (AMN) is a rare hereditary neurodegenerative disorder that primarily affects the spinal cord and peripheral nerves, occurring in less than 1 in 40,000 people. It is characterised by progressive motor dysfunction and adrenal insufficiency. AMN is a form of X-linked adrenoleukodystrophy, a peroxisomal disorder caused by mutations in the ABCD1 gene. Symptoms most commonly begin in a person's late twenties. AMN predominantly affects adult males but heterozygous females may develop symptoms later in life. Treatments mainly center around symptom-management.

== Symptoms ==
Symptoms of AMN typically begin in adulthood, with the mean onset of symptoms for affected males occurring at 27.6 years of age. Common symptoms include:

- Spastic paraparesis (progressive stiffness and weakness of the legs)
- Ataxia (loss of coordination)
- Neurogenic bladder and bowel dysfunction
- Sexual dysfunction
- Adrenocortical insufficiency, leading to fatigue, weight loss, and low blood pressure
- Peripheral neuropathy, causing numbness or pain in the limbs

Approximately 46% of males with AMN also experience cerebral involvement, which can result in cognitive decline, behavioural changes, vision and hearing loss, and seizures.

Heterozygous females, though once thought to be asymptomatic carriers, tend to develop myelopathy and/or neuropathy before the age of 60, with the likelihood of symptoms increasing with age. While between 70-85% of males with AMN develop adrenocortical insufficiency, only 1% of symptomatic heterozygous females develop this condition. Only 2% of heterozygous females experience cerebral involvement.

== Causes ==
AMN is caused by mutations in the ABCD1 gene located within the Xq28 region of the X chromosome. Over 1040 pathogenic variants of this gene have been identified. The ABCD1 gene encodes for the ATP-binding cassette (ABC) subfamily D member 1 protein, also known as the adrenoleukodystrophy protein (ALDP). ALDP facilitates the transport and subsequent degradation of very long-chain fatty acids (VLCFAs) via peroxisomal beta-oxidation. AMN is caused by a deficiency in ALDP, which precipitates the accumulation of VLCFAs within tissues that are typically ALDP-rich, namely the spinal cord, brain, adrenal glands, and testes. This results in a non-inflammatory myelopathy, primarily facilitated by microglial cells. AMN is primarily an axonopathy or neuronopathy, with the spinal cord being the most consistently affected structure. Spinal cord lesions typically occur in a bilateral, symmetrical manner and tend to severely impact the gracile and corticospinal tracts.

== Diagnosis ==
AMN can be detected via newborn screening tests. Blood tests may reveal elevated VLCFA levels, and genetic testing can be used to pinpoint mutations in the ABCD1 gene. Adrenocortical insufficiency can be identified by measuring plasma adrenocorticotropic hormone (ACTH) levels or conducting an ACTH stimulation test.

If AMN is diagnosed before the onset of symptoms, it is recommended that patients receive regular cerebral MRIs and adrenal insufficiency screening to monitor disease progression.

== Treatment ==
While there is no cure for AMN, treatments are available for symptom-management and to slow progression of the disease. Adrenal insufficiency can be treated with hormone replacement therapy, including the administration of glucocorticoids such as hydrocortisone and mineralocorticoids such as fludrocortisone. Cerebral AMN is typically treated with haematopoietic stem cell transplantation.

Lorenzo's oil has been proposed as method of reducing VLCFA levels within AMN patients, though the clinical efficacy of this treatment remains controversial. Immunosuppressive and immunomodulating drugs have been found to be ineffective in treating AMN.

== Prognosis ==
The progression of AMN varies greatly among affected individuals. Clinical phenotype cannot be predicted from gene variants, and patient outcomes are suspected to be modulated by genetic and environmental factors. Early diagnosis and personalised interventions are thus crucial for managing AMN and addressing the specific needs of this population.
