= ABCD2 =

Protein-coding gene in humans

Identifiers
- Aliases: ABCD2, ABC39, ALDL1, ALDR, ALDRP, hALDR, ATP binding cassette subfamily D member 2
- External IDs: OMIM: 601081; MGI: 1349467; GeneCards: ABCD2

Gene location (Human)
Chr.	Chromosome 12 (human)
Band	12q12	Start	39,550,033 bp
Band	12q12	End	39,619,803 bp

Gene location (Mouse)
Chr.	Chromosome 15 (mouse)
Band	15|15 E3	Start	91,030,074 bp
Band	15|15 E3	End	91,076,002 bp
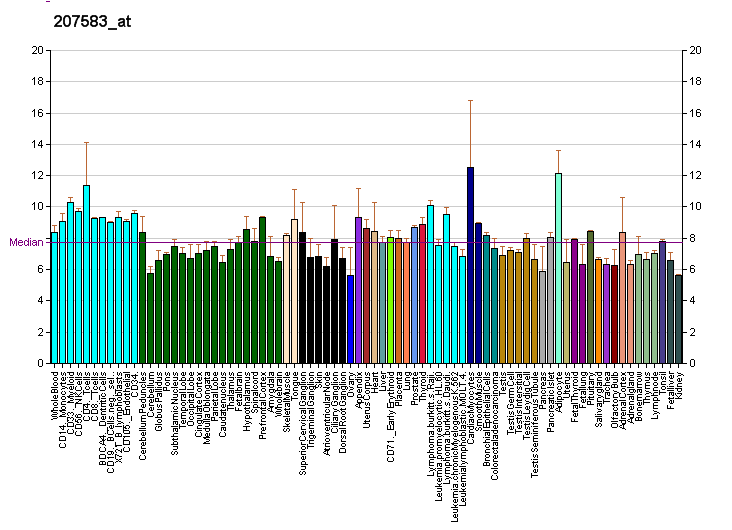
RNA expression pattern
Bgee	Human / Mouse (ortholog); Top expressed in: testicle; cerebellar cortex; cerebellar hemisphere; right hemisphere of cerebellum; ganglionic eminence; ventricular zone; Achilles tendon; prefrontal cortex; right auricle of heart; adipose tissue / Top expressed in: white adipose tissue; brown adipose tissue; granulocyte; temporal muscle; sternocleidomastoid muscle; subcutaneous adipose tissue; intercostal muscle; triceps brachii muscle; digastric muscle; ventricular zone; More reference expression data
BioGPS	More reference expression data
Gene ontology
Molecular function	ATPase-coupled transmembrane transporter activity; nucleotide binding; ATPase activity; protein binding; ATP binding; protein homodimerization activity; long-chain fatty acid transporter activity
Cellular component	integral component of membrane; cytosol; peroxisome; peroxisomal membrane; membrane
Biological process	positive regulation of fatty acid beta-oxidation; very long-chain fatty acid catabolic process; fatty acid beta-oxidation; very long-chain fatty acid metabolic process; transmembrane transport; long-chain fatty acid transport; myelin maintenance; neuron projection maintenance; positive regulation of unsaturated fatty acid biosynthetic process; negative regulation of cytokine production involved in inflammatory response; negative regulation of reactive oxygen species biosynthetic process
Sources:Amigo / QuickGO
Orthologs
Databases	NCBI: entry; OMA: entry
Species	Human	Mouse
Entrez	225	26874
Ensembl	ENSG00000173208	ENSMUSG00000055782
UniProt	Q9UBJ2	Q61285
RefSeq (mRNA)	NM_005164	NM_011994; NM_001358967
RefSeq (protein)	NP_005155	NP_036124; NP_001345896
Location (UCSC)	Chr 12: 39.55 – 39.62 Mb	Chr 15: 91.03 – 91.08 Mb
PubMed search
- Wikidata
View/Edit Human	View/Edit Mouse

ATP-binding cassette sub-family D member 2 is a membrane pump/transporter protein that in humans is encoded by the ABCD2 gene.

== Function ==
The protein encoded by this gene is a member of the superfamily of ATP-binding cassette (ABC) transporters. ABC proteins transport various molecules across extra- and intra-cellular membranes. ABC genes are divided into seven distinct subfamilies (ABC1, MDR/TAP, MRP, ALD, OABP, GCN20, White). This protein is a member of the ALD subfamily, which is involved in peroxisomal import of fatty acids and/or fatty acyl-CoAs in the organelle. All known peroxisomal ABC transporters are half transporters which require a partner half transporter molecule to form a functional homodimeric or heterodimeric transporter. The function of this peroxisomal membrane protein is unknown; however this protein is speculated to function as a dimerization partner of ABCD1 and/or other peroxisomal ABC transporters.

== Clinical significance ==
Mutations in this gene have been observed in patients with adrenoleukodystrophy, a severe demyelinating disease. This gene has been identified as a candidate for a modifier gene, accounting for the extreme variation among adrenoleukodystrophy phenotypes. This gene is also a candidate for a complement group of Zellweger syndrome, a genetically heterogeneous disorder of peroxisomal biogenesis.

== See also ==
- ATP-binding cassette transporter

== Interactions ==
ABCD2 has been shown to interact with PEX19.
