= Detroit 1-8-7 =

American police procedural drama series

- The title card for the series
- Genre: Police procedural
- Created by: Jason Richman
- Starring: Michael Imperioli; Natalie Martinez; Aisha Hinds; Shaun Majumder; Jon Michael Hill; James McDaniel; D. J. Cotrona; Erin Cummings
- Composers: Dave Kushner; John O'Brien
- Country of origin: United States
- Original language: English
- No. of seasons: 1
- No. of episodes: 18

Production
- Executive producers: David Hoberman; Jason Richman; David Zabel; Todd Lieberman
- Production locations: Atlanta, Georgia (pilot); Detroit, Michigan (series)
- Running time: 42 minutes
- Production companies: Remainder Men; Mandeville Television; ABC Studios

Original release
- Network: ABC
- Release: September 21, 2010 – March 20, 2011

Detroit 1-8-7 is an American police procedural drama series about the Detroit Police Department's leading homicide unit, created by Jason Richman for ABC. It featured an ensemble cast of actors including Michael Imperioli and James McDaniel. It ran for one season consisting of 18 episodes on ABC from September 21, 2010 to March 20, 2011. It was filmed on location in Detroit, except for the pilot, which was filmed in Atlanta.

The show's executive producer, David Zabel stated, "This is a crime show but we will explore various nooks and crannies in the communities and within that context there's a lot of opportunity to see what's positive in the city and see what's heroic about the people fighting for what's best for the city of Detroit."

The 1-8-7 of the title is a specific reference to the California Penal Code designation for homicide, which has become a slang term for murder. The Michigan Compiled Laws designation for the various forms of homicide begins at 750.

On May 13, 2011, Detroit 1-8-7 was canceled by ABC. With the cancellation, series creator Jason Richman has said he is pursuing options for the series to continue on cable television, also stating that chances for the move are "slim". It was released on DVD later that year.

== Cast ==
=== Main ===
- Michael Imperioli as Det. Louis Fitch, a mysterious man with a troubled past who is seen as fascinatingly odd by his co-workers. His family was threatened due to a case involving a Mafia boss that he was working on as an NYPD detective. Given the ultimatum of staying or letting his family live, Detective Fitch moved from New York City to Detroit. He is reunited with his son in the seventeenth episode and kills the mob boss in the series finale.
- Natalie Martinez as Det. Ariana Sanchez, a young Hispanic woman and lifelong Detroit resident with two years in Homicide.
- Jon Michael Hill as Det. Damon Washington, a rookie detective who lives in the Detroit suburb of Taylor who joined the homicide squad in the pilot after leading his precinct in clearance rates. He has an infant son and young wife. He is shot in the gut and nearly killed by a murder suspect during his first day in homicide, but Detective Fitch killed the suspect and saved his life.
- James McDaniel as Sgt. Jesse Longford, a lifelong Detroit resident with 30 years in homicide. He has three grown daughters with his late Italian wife (evidenced by his heavy influence in Italy and the Italian language). He is a second generation Detroit police officer (his father Brent was one of the first African American police officers in Detroit). He puts in his retirement papers, and considers moving to Tuscany, but later changes his mind.
- Aisha Hinds as Lt. Maureen Mason, the head of the homicide unit with 15 years in Homicide. She has two young teenage daughters.
- D. J. Cotrona as Det. John Stone, a young detective who transferred from working undercover narcotics to homicide in the first episode. The seventeenth episode begins with confirmation that he died from the gunshot wounds he suffered from a drug addicted ex-girlfriend at the end of "Stone Cold".
- Shaun Majumder as Det. Vikram Mahajan, a confirmed bachelor. His parents in India have an arranged marriage started for him. He has seven years experience in homicide.
- Erin Cummings as Dr. Abbey Ward, the Wayne County Medical Examiner.

=== Recurring ===
The following characters appeared in several episodes:

- Rio Scafone as Public Defender, Linda Stephens. Goes head to head with Fitch, never quite getting the upper hand.
- Megan Dodds as Special Agent Jess Harkins, a young FBI agent from the White Collar Crime division who moves from Chicago and joins the squad midway through the series to gain experience in homicide investigations.
- Kristina Apgar as Riley Sullivan, Detective Stone's junkie ex-girlfriend who kills him after he evicts her from his apartment. She is then killed by Detective Sanchez.
- Ron Heisler as Detective Chuck Brown, friend of Detective Washington from his Narcotics division days
- Tessa Thompson as Lauren Washington, Detective Washington's wife.
- Rochelle Aytes as Alice Williams, a young prosecuting attorney who is murdered midway through the series.
- Erin Way as Wendy Chapin-Lomeister, a criminal justice student who interns at the homicide bureau midway through the series
- Jefferson Mays as Dr Roger Kosowski, a psychiatrist.
- Vadim Imperioli as Bobby Fitch, Detective Fitch's preteen son. (Played by real-life son of Michael Imperioli, who plays Detective Fitch).
- Mo McRae as Pooch, a drug dealer the detectives arrest, who later returns as a confidential informant.
- R. Ernie Silva as Chito, a drug dealer and acquaintance of Pooch who is twice arrested by the detectives during the series.
- Tommy Flanagan as Albert Stram, a mobster from New York City who blackmailed Fitch into leaving the NYPD. He comes to Detroit and continues to threaten Fitch and his family, but Fitch kills him in the series finale.

==== Unnamed recurring characters ====
The following unnamed characters appeared in several episodes:

- Pennie Marie-Hawkins, Steven Hauptman, and Nicholas Ritz as unnamed patrol officers who appeared at homicide scenes in every episode.
- Randall Bruce, Morris Lee Sullivan, Robin E. Silas, and Zach Stewart as unnamed detectives.
- Anne Keeble as Lt. Mason's secretary.
- Tiffany Tremblay as the homicide division's receptionist.
- Steven Schoolmeesters as Dr. Ward's assistant.
- Alicia McGill as a WXYZ-TV news reporter.

== Episodes ==
No.	Title	Directed by	Written by	Original release date	U.S. viewers (millions)
1	"Pilot"	Jeffrey Nachmanoff	Jason Richman	September 21, 2010	9.34
Detective Louis Fitch helps his new partner Detective Washington fit into the homicide division while investigating a double homicide at a pharmacy. Sergeant Longford and Detective Mahajan investigate the murder of a lawyer found in a train yard. When forensics connect the cases they realize they have a serial killer seeking revenge on those whom he believes stole his family from him. Detective John Stone is re-assigned from narcotics to homicide.
2	"Local Hero / Overboard"	Kevin Hooks	Jason Richman & David Zabel	September 28, 2010	8.712
Detectives Sanchez and Stone investigate the murder of college football star with a number of assumed suspects including the victim's best friend, brother and reformed criminal turned club owner. Meanwhile, Sergeant Longford and Detective Mahajan investigate the murder of a groom on his wedding night. They discover that no one liked the groom and anyone attending the wedding had a motive for his murder.
3	"Nobody's Home / Unknown Soldier"	Stephen Cragg	Jason Richman & David Zabel	October 5, 2010	7.829
Detectives Fitch and Washington investigate who murdered an elderly woman in her home, even though the victim was not allowed to live in the house then connecting a big-time real estate developer, possibly behind the murder. Sanchez and Stone try to find who murdered a teenage boy and victimized his father by luring them with a vintage car ad.
4	"Royal Bubbles / Needle Drop"	Dean White	Byron Balasco	October 12, 2010	6.977
Detectives Fitch, Washington, Stone, and Sanchez investigate the murder of a car-wash owner. They discover that the owner of the car-wash was laundering money for a local drug dealer and that his wife has the bank statements and receipts to prove it. Using the belief that her son is distraught at the separation from his mother Fitch and Stone trick her into meeting with them. Longford and Mahajan investigate the slaying of a rising hip-hop star who is found on the street in front of a record store. The murdered musician's vandalised car is atop the parking structure it is believed he was pushed off of. It is also revealed that Detective Stone might have been involved in some more illicit activities during his time working undercover narcotics. Xzibit guest stars as a record producer. J. D. Williams also guest stars.
5	"Murder in Greektown / High School Confidential"	Nick Gomez	Denitria Harris-Lawrence	October 19, 2010	7.936
A teenage girl from the same school Lt. Mason's daughter Simone attends is murdered in a field near the school. Detectives Stone and Washington initially pursue a registered sex offender who flees when they approach the nearby construction site where he is working. Simone ends up giving a number of clues assisting Detectives Fitch and Sanchez in their investigation. Longford and Mahajan investigate the late night murder of a defense attorney's son in the kitchen of a Greek restaurant. Fingerprints on a bible left at the scene lead to a woman at a church. After she pulls a gun on them Sgt Langford realises that she has a sudden, profound fear of the police and negotiates a calm resolution to the standoff by reciting part of 1 Corinthians 13. The suspect, Zoe, later reveals that she witnessed the murder of her boyfriend and that the shooter was wearing a police uniform.
6	"Lost Child / Murder 101"	Paul McCrane	Jason Richman & Nikki Toscano	October 26, 2010	8.447
A woman is murdered in a vehicle with a little girl in the back seat. The case later unfolds to involvement with city social workers. Elsewhere, Longford and Mahajan investigate the murder of a college janitor with two unlikable female medical students being the prime suspects.
7	"Broken Engagement / Trashman"	Ed Bianchi	Rob Hanning	November 9, 2010	7.551
Fitch, Sanchez and Stone investigate the murder of a female technician. The woman's involvement in a complicated love triangle may have led to her murder. Longford and Washington investigate the murder of a petty drug dealer whose body was found in city trash bin. Mahajan tries to convince a scared witness to testify against a ruthless criminal.
8	"Déjà Vu / All In"	Jean de Segonzac	Mick Betancourt	November 16, 2010	8.030
A teenage boy is murdered in his bedroom but his body is missing. Detectives Fitch and Washington look into his friends who are all obsessed with mobster movies. A witness leads them to a cross-border drug smuggling operation and the detectives go to Windsor to make a few inquiries of a known dealer. Elsewhere, Longford and Mahajan investigate the murder of a man from Kansas City who was taking part in a poker tournament.
9	"Home Invasion / Drive-By"	Kevin Hooks	Denitria Harris-Lawrence	November 30, 2010	7.293
An eleven-year-old boy playing video games in his home is hit with a stray bullet. A woman is suspected of murdering her husband. It is then revealed that both crimes are connected due to the same exact gun being used.
10	"Shelter"	David Straiton	David Zabel	December 7, 2010	6.830
Two bodies dating back to the 1967 Detroit riot are found in an abandoned shelter. Longford's father, to everyone's surprise is able to help with this investigation. Meanwhile, Fitch, Washington, Stone and Sanchez investigate the murder of a Latina.
11	"Ice Man / Malibu"	Paul Edwards	Byron Balasco	January 4, 2011	5.200
Detectives Fitch and Washington work with Lt. Mason to solve the homicide of a Hollywood actress who was murdered while filming a movie in Detroit. Detectives Stone, Sanchez, Mahajan, and Sgt. Longford try to figure out how a homeless man ended up frozen in a block of ice.
12	"Key to the City"	Seith Mann	Story by : Nikki Toscano; Teleplay by : Jason Richman & David Zabel	January 11, 2011	5.05
Sgt. Longford's surprise retirement party is overshadowed by news of the murder of an assistant prosecutor in the parking lot of the courthouse.
13	"Road to Nowhere"	Matthew Penn	Story by : Andrew Fash; Teleplay by : Jason Richman & David Zabel	February 1, 2011	5.489
Detective Fitch is the prime suspect in the murder of Henry Malloy (Todd Stashwick), a prominent philanthropist who had just been given the key to the city. Lt. Mason is not at all pleased when Jess Harkins, an FBI agent from Chicago, is brought in to lead the investigation just because Mr Malloy was the subject of a federal investigation. After interrogating Detective Fitch for a little while he asks Special Agent Harkins if he can go. When she says they are just getting started he turns and profiles her and says that she needs to learn to do her job better and excuses himself to go do his job. Special Agent Harkins continues her interviews of Fitch's co-workers while they investigate a shooting aboard a bus and a large sum of money littering the street. When advising next-of-kin of the shooting Detectives Washington and Fitch discover the money was a ransom payment and that the granddaughter of one of the men killed on the bus has been kidnapped. Realising that everybody who has seen the girl's father are now dead Detective Fitch agrees to go undercover as the distraught father who has the new ransom payment. While changing out of his work suit Detective Fitch confides in his partner that he left New York City because 'Big Al' Stram, a mobster he had been close to arresting, promised to kill his son if he didn't leave. The FBI arrests a known hit man for the murder of Henry Malloy. Detective Fitch is on his way home after stopping for some groceries when he gets a call from 'Big Al' Stram who offers his welcomes for helping to clean up Detroit and says that he is looking for a new friend.
14	"Beaten / Cover Letter"	Andrew Bernstein	Rob Hanning	February 8, 2011	5.493
Sgt. Longford and Det. Mahajan look into a cold case when new evidence is brought to them by the victim's mother. Detectives Stone, Fitch, Sanchez, and Washington investigate the murder of the fiancée of a boxer just before one of the biggest matches of his career.
15	"Legacy / Drag City"	Dean White	Nikki Toscano	February 15, 2011	5.199
Riley, Detective Stone's ex-girlfriend from his time working undercover narcotics, returns to complicate things for Detective Stone in his new relationship with Detective Sanchez. Detective Mahajan and Sgt. Longford investigate the murder of one of the city's most prominent drag queens. Detectives Washington and Fitch are assigned to the murder of two rival gang members and an ex-con confessing to having killed them in self-defense.
16	"Stone Cold"	Darnell Martin	Mike Flynn	March 8, 2011	5.085
Detective Stone again crosses paths with Pup Clemmons (J. D. Williams), a drug dealer he knew from his days working undercover narcotics, when he investigates the murder of a college girl. When Pup's alibi is verified the detectives look to the host of a party the girl had attended and then to his mother. After learning that Riley was beaten up by drug dealers because she owes them for a kilogram of heroin Detective Stone tells her he is not helping her any more. When Pup later confronts Detective Stone he reveals that his is an undercover DEA agent and is needing Stone's help in a sting on some guys looking to claim territory in a drug war. The next morning, desperate for the money to pay her drug debt Riley shoots Detective Stone hoping to collect the bounty put out on him by the drug dealers whom he had arrested the night before. Detective Sanchez hears the shots and runs to the scene and shoots Riley.
17	"Motor City Blues"	David Zabel	David Zabel	March 15, 2011	5.644
Everyone is dealing with the murder of Detective Stone in their own way. Detective Fitch attempts to once again be a father to his twelve-year-old son Bobby (Vadim Imperioli) when his ex-wife brings him from New York for a visit. Detective Fitch's attempts at a reconciliation are met with the announcement that she is going with her fiancé to Hawai'i for a week while Bobby visits with him. Sgt. Longford finally gets to the paperwork to formalize his retirement. The detectives investigate the murder of Jordan Loney, a graffiti artist. 'Big Al' Stram comes to Detroit.
18	"Blackout"	Kevin Hooks	Jason Richman	March 20, 2011	4.652
Sgt. Longford reconsiders his retirement but gets told that it is not that simple to undo. Detective Fitch's time with his son Bobby (Vadim Imperioli) is interrupted by the arrival of 'Big Al' Stram (Tommy Flanagan) from New York. A family is killed over what is believed to be a drug debt. Special Agent Harkins confronts Detective Fitch about his claiming to have never heard of Al Stram because she now holds the unsealed case files of his investigation in New York. When it is discovered that the father of the murdered family was a supervisor with Customs and Border Protection at the Ambassador Bridge and that he had refused to work with Stram Detective Fitch realizes it is a message to him. When Detective Washington realizes that it was Stram whom he saw at the museum talking with his partner he informs Lt. Mason. When confronted about the secrecy Detective Fitch reveals that his case against Stram in New York ended because Stram had killed his partner and his partner's family and he believes that Stram will do the same to Detective Washington and his family if he isn't stopped. Determined to not let Stram get away again Detective Fitch entrusts his son to Detective Washington's care and with Detective Majahan and Sgt. Longford goes after the Scottish mobster, staying at least one step ahead of Special Agent Harkins who only wants to get Stram in custody. The rest of the department attends the baptism of Detective Washington's son.

== Production ==
On November 6, 2009 ABC picked up five new projects from Mandeville Films which included Detroit 1-8-7, at the time called "187 Detroit". ABC ordered the pilot of Detroit 1-8-7 on January 4, 2010. Jon Michael Hill was the first person cast for the show in late January. Nellie Andreeva, then of The Hollywood Reporter, reported on January 27, 2010 that the lead role in Detroit 1-8-7 had been offered to British actor Jason Isaacs. Aisha Hinds, Natalie Martinez, and D.J. Cotrona were all cast in February 2010. It was announced on night of March 2, 2010 that Michael Imperioli joined the cast of Detroit 1-8-7. Three days later it was announced that James McDaniel, Shaun Majumder, and Erin Cummings had been cast in the remaining principal roles of Detroit 1-8-7. The character Detective Louis Fitch was originally named Joseph Fitch and the Wayne County Medical Examiner's name was Dr. Hailey Cork in the pilot. The pilot was filmed in Atlanta, Georgia in March 2010.

On May 18, 2010 it was confirmed that ABC had picked up Detroit 1-8-7 for the 2010–11 TV season. Although the pilot episode was shot in Atlanta, the series is filmed in Detroit. Originally planned as a mockumentary, ABC decided to abandon the format after the Detroit Police Department suspended real-life documentary ridealongs by camera crews after a controversial police shooting during filming of the A&E documentary series The First 48. The casting call for extras in Detroit was announced on June 18, 2010. Production on the series began on July 20, 2010. Scenes from the pilot were re-shot to remove the mockumentary format before the episode aired.

There was a controversy over a single word in the script of the premiere, "soda". The character Pooch, played by Mo McRae said, "You just drunk the last of my soda." The next morning it was a recurring topic on local radio station WDZH (98.7 AMP) about which is the proper term for soft drink in Detroit, "soda" or "pop". The winner was "pop". The character Pooch was also in the seventh episode and that time he asked for a "pop". At the end of the season 1 finale, Detective Fitch asks his son if he would like to get a Coney and soda, to which his son replies that "they don't say soda here, they say pop...everyone knows that", as Detective Fitch nods and smiles.

The series also featured real Detroit ABC affiliate WXYZ-TV, real Detroit newspaper The Detroit News, real Detroit colleges University of Detroit Mercy and Wayne State University and several Motown Records artists' music. Landmarks shown include Comerica Park, Ford Field, the Renaissance Center, and Michigan Central Station.

=== Music ===
The score is composed by Dave Kushner and John O'Brien. Detroit 1-8-7 has been noted for its usage of Motown music in its episodes. Motown music featured in Detroit 1-8-7 includes "Ball of Confusion" by The Temptations, "Higher Ground" and "Living for the City" by Stevie Wonder. The ringtone on Detective Washington's phone in the first episode is "Baby Love" by The Supremes.

List of music used in Detroit 1-8-7

Episode 1: "Pilot"

- Stevie Wonder, "Higher Ground"
- The Temptations, "Papa was a Rolling Stone"
- J Dilla, "It's Like That"
- The Black Keys, "Howlin' for You"
- Blakroc, "Done Did It"

Episode 2: "Local Hero / Overboard"

- James Brown, "The Payback"
- Aretha Franklin, "Drown in My Own Tears"

Episode 3: "Nobody's Home / Unknown Soldier"

- The Staple Singers, "I'll Take You There"
- Stevie Wonder, "Living for the City"

Episode 4: "Royal Bubbles / Needle Drop"

- Kem, "Love Never Fails"
- Big B, "Hot Woman"
- Rahsaan Patterson, "Oh Lord Take Me Back"
- Patsy Cline, "Crazy"
- Frightened Rabbit, "Yes I Would"
- The Temptations, "My Girl" (Italian version)

Episode 5: "Murder in Greektown / High School Confidential"

- Amanda Blank, "Gimme What You Got"

Episode 6: "Lost Child / Murder 101"

- John Legend and the Roots, "Compared to What"
- Mos Def, "Quiet Dog"
- Jay Dee, "Pause"
- The Black Keys, "Things Ain't Like They Used To Be"

Episode 7: "Broken Engagement / Trashman"

- Eminem, "Not Afraid"
- The Dramatics, "Whatcha See is Whatcha Get"

Episode 8: "Deja Vu / All In"

- Andre Williams, "I Don't Need Mary"
- Tara Holloway, "Temptation Took Control of Me & I Fell"
- Bohannon, "South African Man"
- Mojo Monkeys, "Girl Might Do"
- Cee Lo Green, "Die Tryin'"

Episode 9: "Home Invasion / Drive-By"

- The Heavy, "Colleen"
- Black Milk, "Keep Bouncin'"
- Obie Trice, "There They Go"

Episode 10: "Shelter"

- Sam Roberts, "Detroit '67"
- Ray Charles, "Drown in My Own Tears"
- Gil Scott Heron, "We Almost Lost Detroit This Time"

Episode 11: "Ice Man / Malibu"

- Bettye LaVette, "Joy"
- Ornette Coleman, "Rejoicing"
- Marvin Gaye, "Baby Don't You Do It"

Episode 12: "Key to the City"

- Sly & the Family Stone, "In Time"
- Black Joe Lewis & the Honeybears, "I'm Broke"

Episode 13: "Road to Nowhere"

- The Dead Weather, "Hustle and Cuss"
- Corinne Bailey Rae, "Love's on Its Way"

Episode 14: "Beaten / Cover Letter"

- Fabolous, "My Time"
- Aretha Franklin, "Soul Serenade"

Episode 15: "Legacy / Drag City"

- Cee Lo Green, "Bright Lights Bigger City"
- LaBelle, "Lady Marmalade"

Episode 16: "Stone Cold"

- Otis Redding, "I've Been Loving You Too Long"

Episode 17: "Motor City Blues"

- Gnarls Barkley, "Who's Gonna Save My Soul" (Demo Version)
- SubNoize Souljaz feat. Big B, Dirtball & Daddy X, "On Da Rize"
- Glen Hansard, "Falling Slowly"

Episode 18: "Blackout"

- Bobby Blue Band, "Ain't No Love in the Heart of the City"
- Radiohead, "Reckoner"
- Gloriæ Dei Cantores, "Three Choruses from Tsar Feodor Ioannovich : I. Bogoroditse Devo – Rejoice, O Virgin"

== Broadcasting ==
Detroit 1-8-7 premiered on September 21, 2010 at 10:00 pm on ABC. The first season was initially to be 13 episodes. On October 25, 2010 ABC announced the order of an additional 5 episodes to bring the first season to 18 episodes.

The thirteenth episode, "Road To Nowhere", was initially scheduled for January 18, 2011 but was replaced with a 20/20 special interview with Mark E. Kelly, the husband of U.S. Congresswoman Gabby Giffords who is believed to have been the intended target in the shooting near Tucson, Arizona ten days before. The 2011 State of the Union Address was broadcast on January 25. "Road To Nowhere" was broadcast on February 1, 2011.

On February 22, 2011 an episode of Primetime: What Would You Do was shown in place of the previously scheduled sixteenth episode, "Stone Cold". A special 20/20 interview with Charlie Sheen was broadcast on March 1, 2011, again displacing "Stone Cold". "Stone Cold" was eventually broadcast on March 8. The rescheduling of previous episodes put the season finale in conflict with season 12 of Dancing with the Stars and as a result Detroit 1-8-7 was moved to Sunday, March 20 at 10:00 pm.

=== International distribution ===
Detroit 1-8-7 premiered on Fox Crime in Spain, where it is known simply as Detroit, on November 15, 2010. On November 29, 2010 Variety reported that Canal+ has acquired rights to the series and will be showing it in France beginning on January 27, 2011. Detroit 1-8-7 is shown on the national broadcast station RTÉ 2 in Ireland. In India, STAR World India began broadcasting Detroit 1-8-7 on December 14, 2010. In Australia, the Seven Network has the broadcast rights to the series, and began airing it on April 13, 2011.

== DVD release ==
Lionsgate Home Entertainment released the complete series (labeled as "the complete first season") on DVD in Region 1 on August 30, 2011.

== Reception ==
=== Critical ===
Detroit 1-8-7 has an average score of 63/100 on Metacritic based on 22 reviews from television critics. Robert Bianco of USA Today describes the series as the best police drama on ABC since NYPD Blue ended. Bianco says the show's best trait is its uncommon setting and that it is filmed where it is set, "which gives it an authenticity and a palpable sense of place." The New York Times's television critic Alessandra Stanley said the show is "a throwback to an earlier era of cop shows when steel-edged realism was still novel and there was a thrill to watching terse, streetwise detectives on shows like Dragnet and Kojak cajole witnesses and browbeat suspects."

Rob Owen of the Pittsburgh Post-Gazette found Detroit 1-8-7 brings nothing new to the police procedural genre but that it does offer strong performances from its cast. Owen further said that the drama is disappointingly generic, but expected it to appeal to die-hard fans of the genre. In his review of new shows for autumn 2010 Hank Stuever of The Washington Post gives Detroit 1-8-7 a grade of D+ and says "nothing to see here." John Doyle of The Globe and Mail called Detroit 1-8-7 "a too-conventional cop show."

Many critics point out that the ghost remnants of the show's original premise as a mockumentary can be found throughout the first episode.

James Poniewozik of Time said that "Detroit 1-8-7 does not look bad. It's more character-focused than a typical procedural and has a strong, multi-ethnic cast. And it has a sense of the city's history: an African-American cop, referencing the city's white-flight past, says he's been on the force so long that "when I started, half of the suspects were white."

John Roach, former Detroit Police Department spokesman, in speaking of the first episode, said, "I think the show portrayed Detroit's police officers as real people, dedicated, even heroic, which is entirely deserved."

=== Ratings ===
The premiere of Detroit 1-8-7 received 9.34 million viewers and 2.3/7 Adults 18–49 rating/share. The twelfth episode, "Key to the City", recorded 5.05 million viewers and a series low 1.0/3 rating/share among adults 18 to 49 years old. The following episode, "Road to Nowhere" was up to 5.6 million viewers The series finale, "Blackout", marked a series low in viewers at 4.652 million, and a 1.1 in adults 18–49. According to Nielsen, Detroit 1-8-7 averaged 7.57 million viewers and ranked 64th for the 2010-2011 television season.

=== Accolades ===
Detroit 1-8-7 was nominated for Favorite New TV Drama at the 37th People's Choice Awards but it did not make the final cut for the five finalists. The series was also nominated for Outstanding Drama Series at the 2011 NAACP Image Awards. Detroit 1-8-7 was also nominated for a Golden Reel Award and a Banff Rockie Award. Tom O'Neil of the Los Angeles Times said that Detroit 1-8-7 was a possible contender for the Outstanding Drama Series Emmy and that Michael Imperioli was a possible nominee for an Outstanding Lead Actor Emmy, although neither were nominated.
