= Ottone (disambiguation) =

Ottone is a 1723 opera by George Frideric Handel.

Ottone may also refer to:

- Ottone (name), including a list of people with the name
- Ottone, Emilia-Romagna, a comune in the Province of Piacenza, Italy
- Ottone in villa, a 1713 opera by Antonio Vivaldi
- Muscat Ottone, a white wine grape variety

== See also ==
- Oddone
