= Cristina Odone =

Italian-British journalist, editor, and writer

- Born: Cristina Patricia Odone; 11 November 1960 (age 66); Nairobi, British Kenya
- Education: Marymount School; National Cathedral School; St Clare's; Worcester College, Oxford
- Occupations: Charity director, journalist, writer, broadcaster
- Notable credit(s): The Catholic Herald (Editor); New Statesman (Deputy Editor); The Shrine; A Perfect Wife; The Dilemmas of Harriet Carew; The Good Divorce Guide
- Spouse: Edward Lucas
- Children: 1
- Father: Augusto Odone
- Family: Lorenzo Odone (half-brother)
- Website: http://www.cristinaodone.com

Cristina Patricia Odone (born 11 November 1960) is an Italian-British journalist, editor, and writer. She is the founder and chair of the Parenting Circle Charity. Odone is formerly the Editor of The Catholic Herald, Deputy Editor of the New Statesman. She is currently Head of the Family Policy Unit at the Centre for Social Justice.

== Early life ==
Odone was born in Nairobi, Kenya, to an Italian father, Augusto Odone, and a Swedish mother. Her half-brother was Lorenzo Odone, after whom Lorenzo's oil is named.

Odone's father was a World Bank official, which led to the family regularly moving. Odone went initially to Marymount School, then later to the National Cathedral School, Washington, D.C. After her parents' divorce, Odone moved to Britain to go to St Clare's, a boarding school in Oxford. Odone studied French literature and history at Worcester College, Oxford.

== Journalist ==
Odone edited The Catholic Herald from 1991 to 1995. Odone later worked for the World Bank in Washington, D.C., as an advisor to European companies. She resigned from The Catholic Herald to be able to finish her second novel, A Perfect Wife. In 1996, Odone became the television critic for The Daily Telegraph, a position she held for two years.

In 1998, Odone became deputy editor of the New Statesman. Odone resigned in November 2004. For six years Odone was a weekly columnist for The Observer. In 2005, Odone wrote and presented a Channel 4 documentary directed by David Malone called Dispatches: Women Bishops.

Following a dispute with Johann Hari while they were colleagues at the New Statesman, Odone commented that pejorative changes were made to her Wikipedia entry. It subsequently became apparent that Hari was responsible, using pseudonymous sockpuppet accounts to make edits attacking Odone and his critics.

A frequent contributor to radio and television debates, Odone is presently a columnist for The Daily Telegraph.

== Published works ==
Odone has written four novels: The Shrine (1996), A Perfect Wife (1997), The Dilemmas of Harriet Carew (2008) and The Good Divorce Guide (2009) She contributed to Why I am still a Catholic (2005).

== Personal life ==
Odone is married to Edward Lucas, a writer for The Economist magazine. The couple have one child; Lucas has two children from a previous marriage.
