= Edward Lucas (journalist) =

British journalist (born 1962)

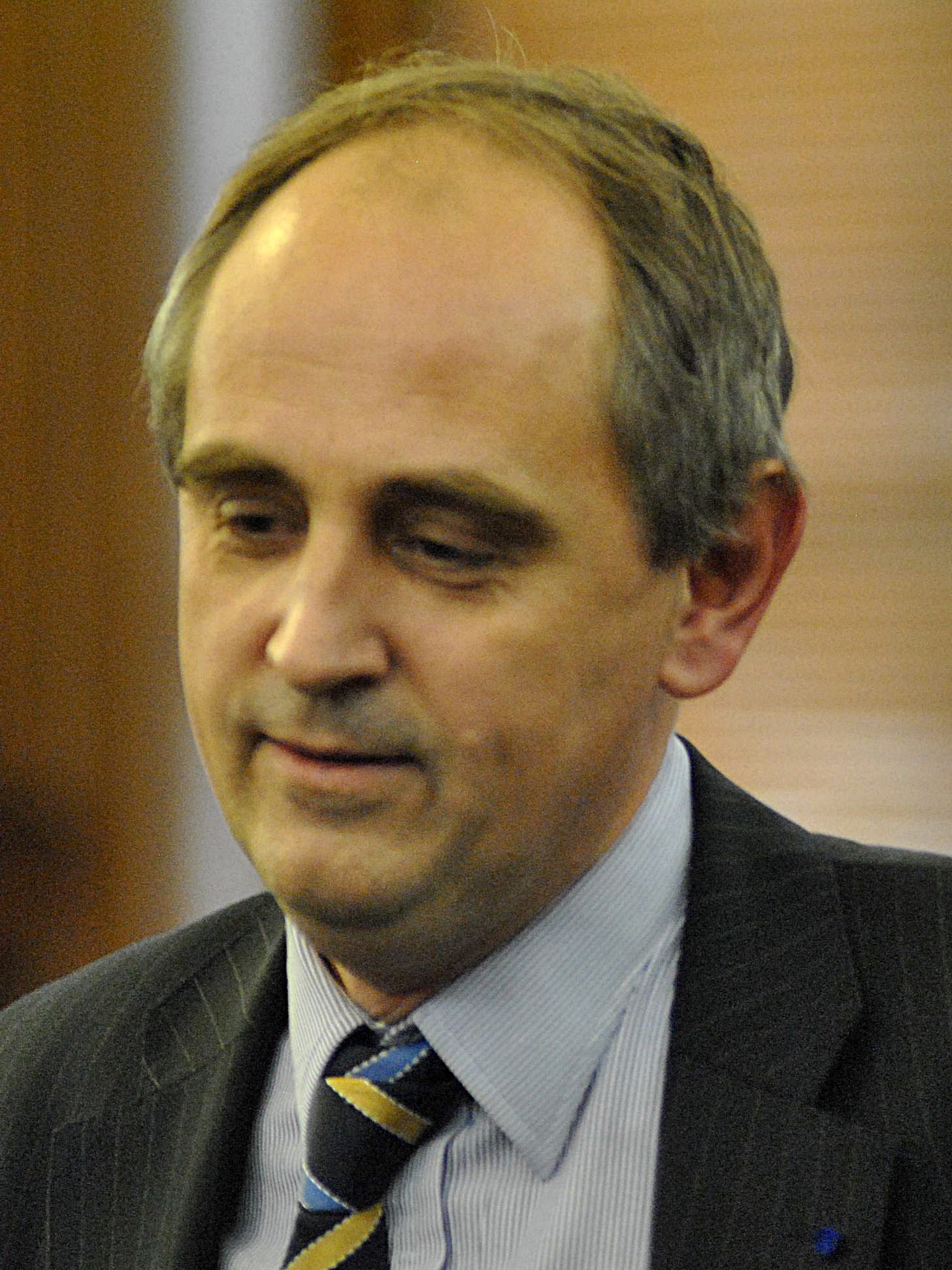
Lucas in 2010

Edward Lucas (born 3 May 1962) is a British writer, journalist, security specialist and politician.

== Career ==
Lucas is the founder of the Baltic International Security Centre. Until 2018, he was a senior editor at The Economist. Earlier, he edited Business Russia and Business Eastern Europe for the EIU in Vienna, was a Foreign Correspondent for The Independent, and produced Newshour for the BBC World Service. He writes a column for The Times and occasionally writes for the Daily Mail. He has edited Standpoint magazine.

In September 2021, he was selected as the Liberal Democrat prospective parliamentary candidate for the constituency of Cities of London and Westminster in the 2024 general election. Lucas came third with 4,335 votes.

== Personal life ==
Lucas's second wife is the columnist Cristina Odone, with whom he has one child; he had two children with his first wife Claudia, who is German. He lives in London. His father was the Oxford philosopher John Lucas.

On 1 December 2014, he became the first e-resident of Estonia.

== Publications ==
- The New Cold War: Putin's Russia and the Threat to the West , Palgrave Macmillan (2008), ISBN 978-0-230-60612-8.
- Deception: The Untold Story of East-West Espionage Today, Walker & Company (2012), ISBN 978-0-8027-1157-1
- The Snowden Operation: Inside the West's Greatest Intelligence Disaster, Amazon (2014), ASIN: B00I0W61OY
- Cyberphobia: Identity, Trust, Security and the Internet, Bloomsbury (2015), ISBN 978-1-4088-5013-8
- Spycraft Rebooted: How Technology is Changing Espionage, Amazon (2018), ASIN: B078W6LXGG
