= ABCD3 =

Protein-coding gene in humans

Identifiers
- Aliases: ABCD3, ABC43, PMP70, PXMP1, ZWS2, CBAS5, ATP binding cassette subfamily D member 3
- External IDs: OMIM: 170995; MGI: 1349216; GeneCards: ABCD3

Gene location (Human)
| Chr. | Chromosome 1 (human) |
| Band | 1p21.3 | Start | 94,418,389 bp |
| Band | 1p21.3 | End | 94,518,666 bp |

Gene location (Mouse)
| Chr. | Chromosome 3 (mouse) |
| Band | 3 G1|3 52.94 cM | Start | 121,552,423 bp |
| Band | 3 G1|3 52.94 cM | End | 121,608,951 bp |
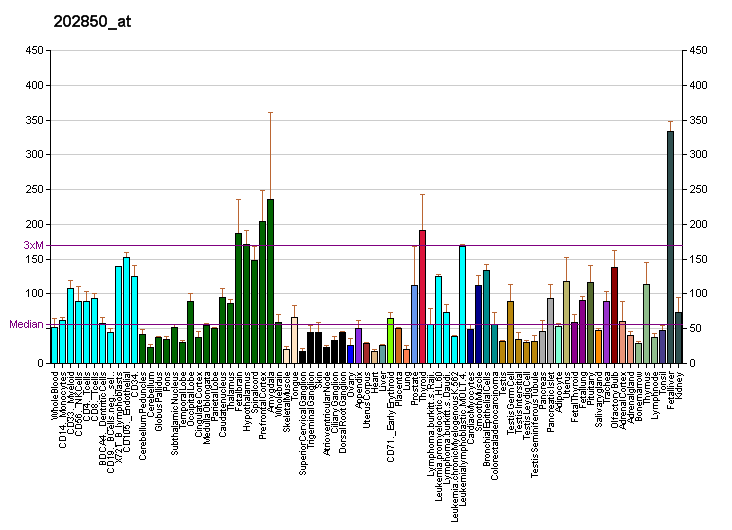
RNA expression pattern
| Bgee | Human / Mouse (ortholog); Top expressed in: secondary oocyte; jejunal mucosa; epithelium of nasopharynx; Epithelium of choroid plexus; mucosa of paranasal sinus; bronchial epithelial cell; kidney tubule; retinal pigment epithelium; palpebral conjunctiva; skin of thigh / Top expressed in: epithelium of stomach; transitional epithelium of urinary bladder; left lobe of liver; conjunctival fornix; saccule; retinal pigment epithelium; mucous cell of stomach; lacrimal gland; gallbladder; skin of external ear; More reference expression data |
| BioGPS | More reference expression data |
Gene ontology
| Molecular function | ATPase-coupled transmembrane transporter activity; nucleotide binding; protein homodimerization activity; protein self-association; ATPase activity; protein binding; ATP binding; long-chain fatty acid transporter activity |
| Cellular component | integral component of membrane; cytosol; membrane; intracellular membrane-bounded organelle; peroxisomal membrane; peroxisome; peroxisomal matrix; mitochondrion; mitochondrial inner membrane |
| Biological process | long-chain fatty acid import into peroxisome; peroxisome organization; response to organic cyclic compound; fatty acid biosynthetic process; transmembrane transport; very long-chain fatty acid catabolic process; fatty acid beta-oxidation; transport |
Sources:Amigo / QuickGO
Orthologs
| Databases | NCBI: entry; OMA: entry |
| Species | Human | Mouse |
| Entrez | 5825 | 19299 |
| Ensembl | ENSG00000117528 | ENSMUSG00000028127 |
| UniProt | P28288 | P55096 |
| RefSeq (mRNA) | NM_001122674; NM_002858 | NM_008991; NM_001355756 |
| RefSeq (protein) | NP_001116146; NP_002849 | NP_033017; NP_001342685 |
| Location (UCSC) | Chr 1: 94.42 – 94.52 Mb | Chr 3: 121.55 – 121.61 Mb |
| PubMed search |
- Wikidata
| View/Edit Human | View/Edit Mouse |

ATP-binding cassette sub-family D member 3 is a protein that in humans is encoded by the ABCD3 gene.

== Function ==
The protein encoded by this gene is a member of the superfamily of ATP-binding cassette (ABC) transporters. ABC proteins transport various molecules across extra- and intra-cellular membranes. ABC genes are divided into seven distinct subfamilies (ABC1, MDR/TAP, MRP, ALD, OABP, GCN20, White). This protein is a member of the ALD subfamily, which is involved in peroxisomal import of fatty acids and/or fatty acyl-CoAs in the organelle. All known peroxisomal ABC transporters are half transporters which require a partner half transporter molecule to form a functional homodimeric or heterodimeric transporter. This peroxisomal membrane protein likely plays an important role in peroxisome biogenesis.

== Clinical significance ==
Mutations have been associated with some forms of Zellweger syndrome, a heterogeneous group of peroxisome assembly disorders. However, this association was denied and congenital bile acid synthesis defect-5 (CBAS5) was recently shown to be caused by homozygous mutation in the ABCD3 gene

== See also ==
- ATP-binding cassette transporter

== Interactions ==
ABCD3 has been shown to interact with PEX19.
