= Hugo Moser (scientist) =

American medical researcher born in Bern, Switzerland (1924–2007)

- Born: October 24, 1924; Bern, Switzerland
- Died: January 20, 2007 (aged 82); Baltimore, Maryland, US
- Education: Harvard, Columbia
- Known for: Adrenoleukodystrophy research
- Spouses: Monti Lou Brigham; Ann Boody (m. 1963)
- Scientific career
- Workplaces: Kennedy Krieger Institute

Hugo Wolfgang Moser (1924–2007) was a Swiss-born American research scientist and director of the Neurogenetics Research Center at the Kennedy Krieger Institute. Moser was also University Professor of Neurology and Pediatrics at Johns Hopkins University. His research on peroxisomal disorders achieved international recognition.

== Early life ==
Moser was born in Bern, Switzerland, the son of Maria and Hugo L. Moser. He grew up in Berlin. His father was of Jewish background and a prominent art dealer in Berlin. His mother was Austrian. Within a month of Hitler taking power in Germany the family left Berlin. Hugo spent his high school years in the Netherlands. Three months prior to the invasion of the Netherlands his mother arranged their timely escape from the Nazis. The family fled via Italy and Spain to Cuba.

In 1940, the family arrived in the US, first living in Baltimore, where the family owned paintings exhibited in the Baltimore Museum of Art, then moved to New York City. Survivor guilt plagued Moser for having escaped the Holocaust without harm. His aunt and uncle, who were not able to leave the Netherlands, died in a German concentration camp. He devoted his life to working for the less privileged and disenfranchised.

== Education ==
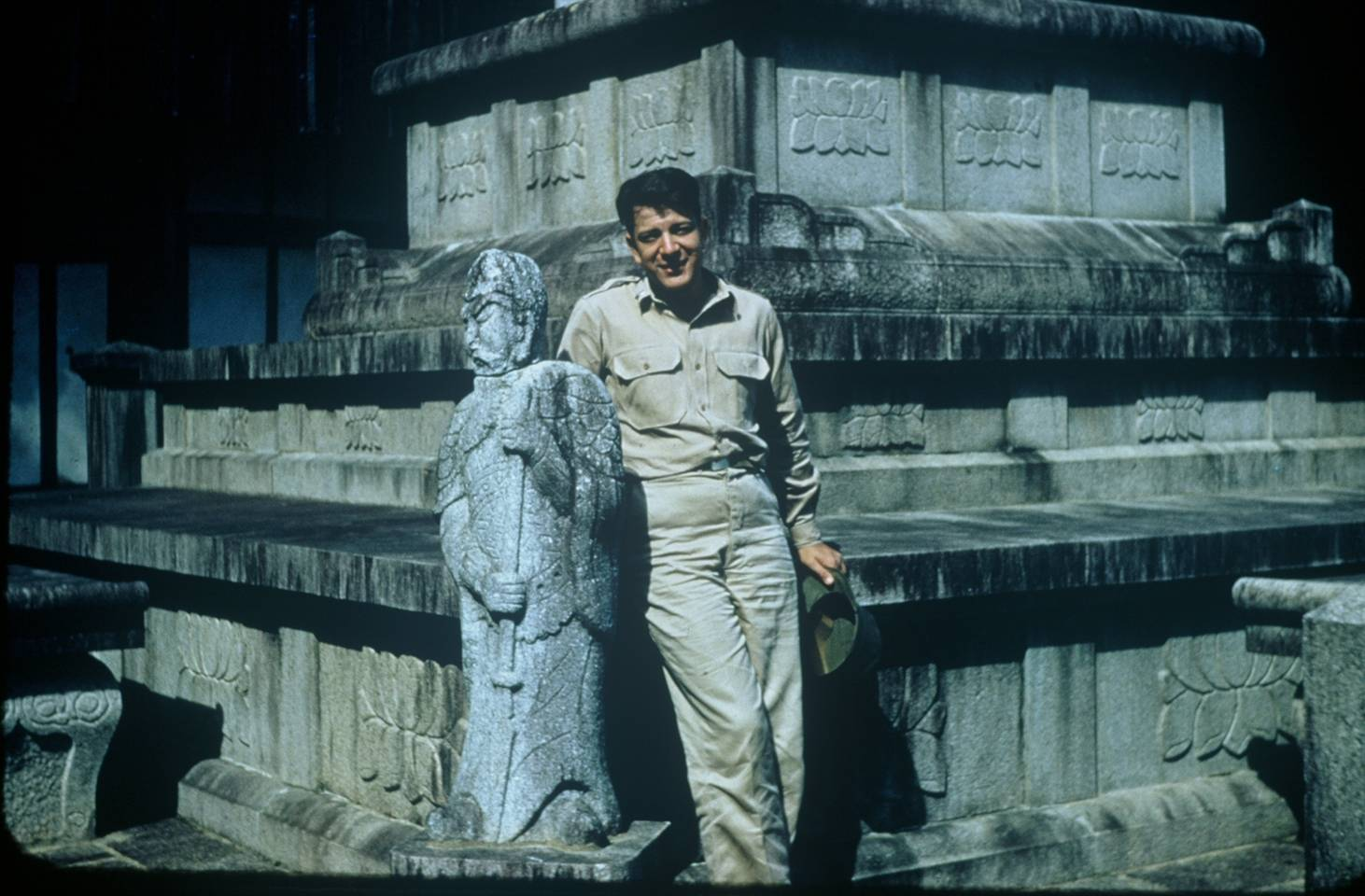
Hugo Moser in Korea

Hugo Moser attended Harvard as a pre-med student until he was drafted into the army. After discharge he went to medical school at Columbia University. At Columbia Presbyterian he was influenced by the chairman of medicine, Robert F. Loeb. He taught Hugo "two laws of therapeutics: if something doesn't work, try something else, and if something does work, keep on doing it". This principle later influenced his work on adrenoleukodystrophy (ALD).

After two years of residency at the Peter Bent Brigham Hospital during the Korean War, he volunteered for the Army. When back in the states, Moser returned to Harvard to get an advanced degree in biochemistry. He took two years of course work and became the first fellow of the National Multiple Sclerosis Society (NMSS).

== Career ==
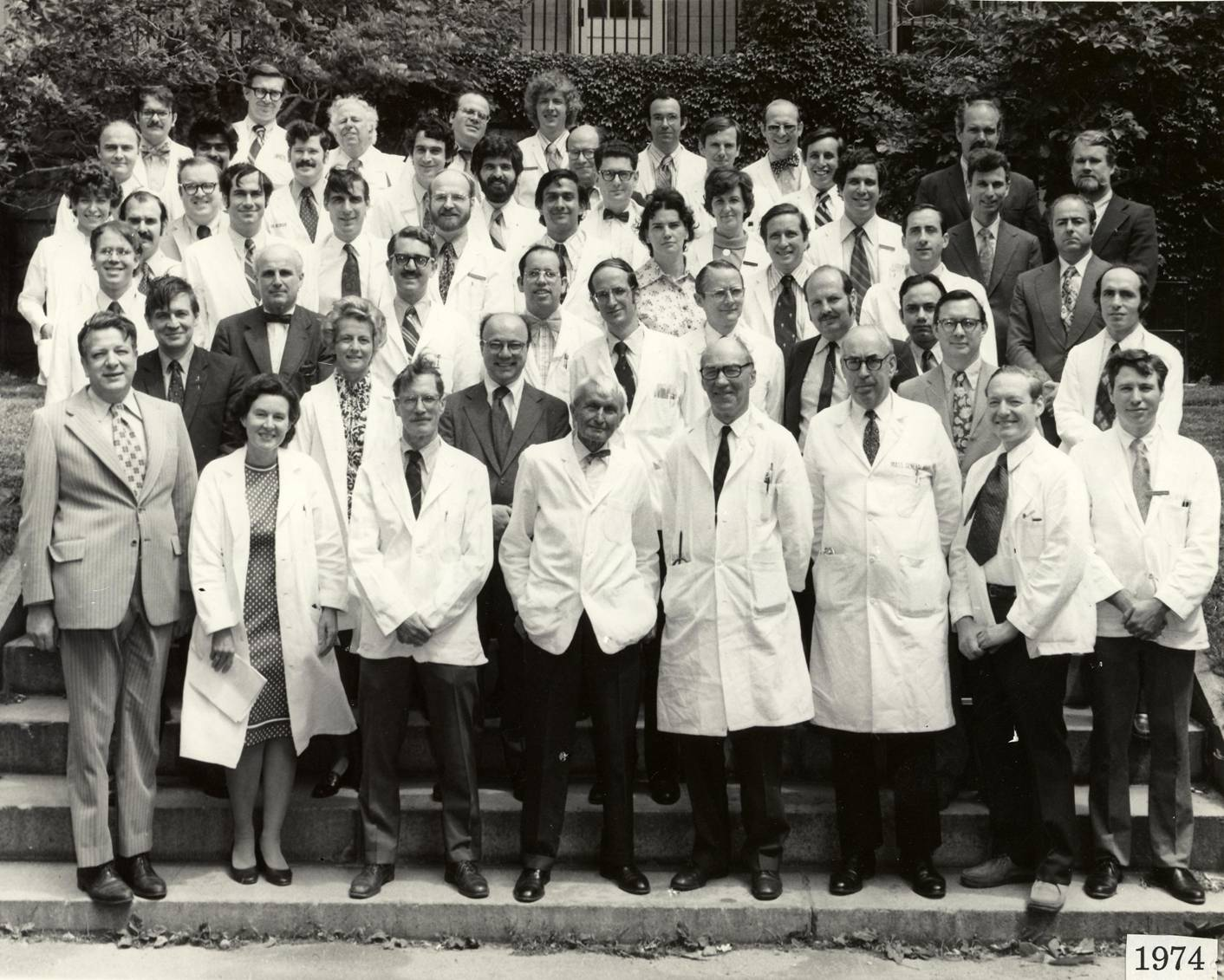
Moser and staff

Moser worked on lipid chemistry with Manfred Karnofsky, until becoming a resident in neurology at Massachusetts General Hospital (MGH), where he established a neurochemistry program. Hugo set up the test for urinary sulfatides and compared the composition of urinary lipids with that of brain in metachromatic leukodystrophy.

Moser spent formative years in the research laboratories of the neurochemist Jordi Folch-Pi and Marjorie Lees at McLean Hospital. At McLean Hospital he interviewed Ann Boody for a position in his laboratory. This proved to be the beginning of a long and successful professional and marital partnership between the two. In the early research years, Moser and Boody worked on lysosomal disorders. They were the first to describe the presence of cholesterol sulfate in the human brain. They further investigated the role of steroid sulfatases in metachromatic leukodystrophy and multiple sulfatase deficiency, and they identified acid ceramidase as the enzyme deficient in Farber's disease. In 1964, Moser returned to the Joseph P. Kennedy research laboratories at MGH, and with Mary Efron and her junior faculty staff, Harvey Levy and Vivian Shih, he started screening programs for amino acid disorders and lysosomal disorders.

When training with other neurologists under Ray Adams at the Fernald State School in Waltham, Massachusetts, Moser became interested in providing better services for persons with developmental and physical disabilities. He was appointed research director and later superintendent of the Fernald State School. He also founded and directed the Eunice Kennedy Shriver Center for research and training in intellectual disability. During this time he became a Harvard University Professor of Neurology at MGH, and established a model of a close link between clinical practice, training and community services for the developmentally disabled and bench research.

=== ALD research ===
In 1976, Moser accepted the position of president of the Kennedy Krieger Institute and professor of Neurology and Pediatrics at Johns Hopkins in Baltimore. Here he was able to merge areas of service, training and research. Yasuo Kishimoto, who had helped Kuni Suzuki make the discovery of elevated very long chain fatty acids in Adrenoleukodystrophy brains at Albert Einstein College of Medicine, followed Moser from the Shriver Center to the Kennedy Institute. With Kishimoto's help, Hugo and Ann Moser developed the first assay for ALD in fibroblasts In 1981, they developed the plasma assay.

Moser worked with Jim Powers for many years defining the phenotypic variation in ALD. Jack Griffin, then a fellow at NIH in endocrinology, first described the adult form of ALD. Beyond establishing the diagnostic testing for X-linked adrenoleukodystrophy, Moser also contributed to the discovery of the gene for X-ALD. During an interview with the American Neurological Association, he recalled how a post-doc by the name of Patrick Aubourg had come from Paris to work in his lab. Aubourg began working on the gene abnormality at Kennedy Krieger. However, it was Aubourg's work with Jean-Louis Mandel in Strasbourg that finally led to identification and mapping of the gene.

As soon as diagnostic testing was established, Moser began to fight for treatment of patients with ALD. Together with the parents’ association United Leukodystrophy Foundation he provided support and guidance for families stricken by this devastating illness. Back in 1982, Johns Hopkins performed the first bone marrow transplantation in ALD. However, it wasn't until Aubourg transplanted a very mildly involved patient with his nonidentical twin as a donor, that bone marrow transplantation had a successful outcome. Moser went on to collaborate a great deal with the University of Minnesota, where Bill Krivit and Charlie Peters developed a unique method of transplantation of ALD boys.

Moser's clinical partners Sakkubai Naidu and Gerald Raymond worked together with him on these clinical trials in ALD patients.

=== Lorenzo's oil ===
One of Moser's longest endeavors was his work on Lorenzo's oil. It began with his relationship with Augusto and Michaela Odone, the parents of Lorenzo Odone, the namesake for Lorenzo's oil. Moser had diagnosed their son with the plasma assay. With the boy's subsequent decline, Moser had suggested dietary therapy and immunosuppression, which turned out not to be successful and contributed to frustration and tension between the Odones and Moser. Together, they organized a symposium at Kennedy Krieger where Bill Rizzo presented data that showed that adding oleic acid (C-18 monounsaturated) to fibroblast cultures of ALD patients would reduce their fatty acids. Odone made an independent intellectual computation – namely that the use of erucic acid, which is C-22:1 (C-22 monounsaturated), would increase the effectiveness – and Lorenzo's oil was developed. Controlled studies, however, indicate that Lorenzo's oil is not effective at treating symptomatic ALD, although it may delay the onset of symptoms if taken before they set in.
