= Voglia di vivere (film) =

1990 television film directed by Lodovico Gasparini

- Written by: Cathérine Grellet; Donald Martin
- Directed by: Lodovico Gasparini
- Starring: Tomas Milian
- Theme music composer: Stelvio Cipriani
- Original language: Italian

Production
- Cinematography: Romano Albani

Original release
- Release: 1990

Voglia di vivere (Desire for life) is a 1990 Italian drama television film directed by Lodovico Gasparini. It is based on real life events of Augusto and Michaela Odone and their son Lorenzo Odone. The same events inspired the 1992 film Lorenzo's Oil. It was shot between Capri and San Francisco.

== Cast ==
- Tomas Milian: Tony
- Dominique Sanda: Linda
- Matthew Ousdahl: Bobby
- Carmen Scarpitta: Dr. Rosemund
