= ABCD1 =

Protein-coding gene in humans

Identifiers
- Aliases: ABCD1, ABC42, ALD, ALDP, AMN, ATP binding cassette subfamily D member 1, Adrenoleukodystrophy protein
- External IDs: OMIM: 300371; MGI: 1349215; GeneCards: ABCD1

Gene location (Human)
Chr.	X chromosome (human)
Band	Xq28	Start	153,724,856 bp
Band	Xq28	End	153,744,755 bp

Gene location (Mouse)
Chr.	X chromosome (mouse)
Band	X A7.3|X 37.39 cM	Start	72,760,203 bp
Band	X A7.3|X 37.39 cM	End	72,782,140 bp
RNA expression pattern
Bgee	Human / Mouse (ortholog); Top expressed in: mucosa of ileum; left adrenal cortex; right adrenal gland; right adrenal cortex; monocyte; apex of heart; gastrocnemius muscle; muscle of thigh; stromal cell of endometrium; body of uterus / Top expressed in: granulocyte; gastrula; jejunum; ankle; tibiofemoral joint; myocardium of ventricle; right ventricle; digastric muscle; internal carotid artery; thoracic diaphragm; More reference expression data
BioGPS	n/a
Gene ontology
Molecular function	ATPase-coupled transmembrane transporter activity; nucleotide binding; protein homodimerization activity; transporter activity; ATPase activity; protein binding; identical protein binding; enzyme binding; long-chain fatty acid transporter activity; ATP binding
Cellular component	cytoplasm; integral component of membrane; cytosol; membrane; peroxisomal membrane; peroxisome; mitochondrion; integral component of peroxisomal membrane; perinuclear region of cytoplasm
Biological process	long-chain fatty acid import into peroxisome; linoleic acid metabolic process; peroxisome organization; alpha-linolenic acid metabolic process; long-chain fatty acid catabolic process; peroxisomal membrane transport; fatty acid beta-oxidation using acyl-CoA oxidase; transmembrane transport; very long-chain fatty acid catabolic process; fatty acid beta-oxidation; transport
Sources:Amigo / QuickGO
Orthologs
Databases	NCBI: entry; OMA: entry
Species	Human	Mouse
Entrez	215	11666
Ensembl	ENSG00000101986	ENSMUSG00000031378
UniProt	P33897	P48410
RefSeq (mRNA)	NM_000033	NM_007435
RefSeq (protein)	NP_000024	NP_031461
Location (UCSC)	Chr X: 153.72 – 153.74 Mb	Chr X: 72.76 – 72.78 Mb
PubMed search
- Wikidata
View/Edit Human	View/Edit Mouse

ABCD1 is a protein that transfers fatty acids into peroxisomes.

== Function ==
The protein encoded by this gene is a member of the superfamily of ATP-binding cassette (ABC) transporters. ABC proteins transport various molecules across extra- and intra-cellular membranes. ABC genes are divided into seven distinct subfamilies (ABC1, MDR/TAP, MRP, ALD, OABP, GCN20, White). This protein is a member of the ALD subfamily, which is involved in peroxisomal import of fatty acids and/or fatty acyl-CoAs in the organelle. All known peroxisomal ABC transporters are half transporters which require a partner half transporter molecule to form a functional homodimeric or heterodimeric transporter. This peroxisomal membrane protein is likely involved in the peroxisomal transport or catabolism of very long chain fatty acids.

== Clinical significance ==
Defects in this gene have been identified as the underlying cause of adrenoleukodystrophy, an X-chromosome recessively inherited demyelinating disorder of the nervous system.

== Interactions ==
ABCD1 has been shown to interact with PEX19.
