= Frederic Oddone =

American judge

Judge of the Utah Third District Juvenile Court
- Incumbent
- Assumed office 1994
- Appointed by: Michael Leavitt

Personal details
- Born: Frederic (Ric) M. Oddone Washington, D.C., U.S.
- Education: B.A., Brigham Young University (1969); J.D., University of Utah (1972)
- Profession: Attorney; Judge
- Known for: Juvenile justice; child abuse and neglect cases; long serving judge in Utah juvenile court

Judge Frederic (Ric) Oddone is an American attorney and judge serving in the Utah Third District Juvenile Court.

== Early life and education ==
Oddone was raised in Washington, D.C. After receiving his high school diploma from Woodrow Wilson High School, also in Washington, DC, Oddone moved to Utah to attend Brigham Young University. Oddone completed his undergraduate degree at Brigham Young University in 1969. Afterward, Judge Oddone attended the University of Utah for post-graduate studies. He received his J.D. (Juris Doctor) degree from the University of Utah Law School in 1972.

== Legal career ==
After graduation, Mr. Oddone served as a Deputy Salt Lake County Attorney under Carl Nemelka, Salt Lake County Attorney at the time. Mr. Oddone served in the Salt Lake County Attorney's office criminal division, specializing in juvenile deliquency, child abuse and child neglect cases. In 1986, Mr. Oddone was appointed the Division Chief of Juvenile & Family Court Division. While working in the Salt Lake County Attorney's office, Mr. Oddone served on the Governor's Task Force on Juvenile Justice, the Utah Supreme Court Committee on Rules & Procedure in the Juvenile Court, the Salt Lake County Commission on Young, the Salt Lake City Gang Task Force, the Utah Legislature's Blue Ribbon Task Force on Family Law and the Utah Adoption Council. Mr. Oddone continued his service in the Salt Lake County Attorney's office until 1994, when he was appointed to the Utah Juvenile Court.

== Judicial career ==
In 1994, Mr. Oddone was appointed to the Third District Juvenile Court by then Governor Michael Leavitt. He has since been retained to the bench after a successful judicial retention election in 2010. Judge Oddone has had several successful retention elections, winning the most recent election with 73% of the vote. While in service to the Third District Juvenile Court, Judge Oddone has been a member of the Salt Lake City Mayor's Gang Task Force on Gang Violence, a member of the Judicial Council Family Court Task Force, the chairman of the Utah State Task Force on Court Security, served on the Salt Lake Criminal Justice Advisory Council. Judge Oddone serves as the Court's representative to the Sentencing Commission, an instructor for judicial faculty, the chairman of the Criminal Justice Program Advisory Committee at Salt Lake Community College and teaches law within the paralegal department of Salt Lake Community College. Judge Oddone has also served two terms as the presiding judge for Utah's Third District Juvenile Court in addition to serving on the Court's Management Committee.

== Notable cases and rulings ==
=== State of Utah in the interest of ACC ===
Case No. 20000596, 2002 04.22 6

In 1998, Judge Oddone heard a case involving a minor who was claiming to have been the subject of an illegal search. The Judge decided that, as a minor, the accused was not accorded the same rights to privacy as would be accorded an adult. The Judge's decision was subsequently overturned by the Utah Court of Appeals. The Court of Appeals ruled that the accused did have a reasonable expectation of privacy, and therefore, ruled that the search was unlawful. A certiorari petition was sent to and accepted by the Utah State Supreme Court. The Supreme Court then found, in a 5-0 ruling, that the accused had no reasonable expectation of privacy . The Supreme Court overturned the ruling of the appellate court and agreed with Judge Oddone's original ruling on the matter.

=== State v. Heidi Mattingly ===
In January 2005, Judge Oddone was assigned by the presiding judge of the Utah Juvenile Court to review a videotaped interview entered as evidence in a custody case between the State of Utah and Heidi Mattingly-Foster. Mattingly-Foster, one wife within a known polygamist family, was placed on trial after reportedly abusing her ten children and using her children as leverage. Judge Oddone's participation in the case stemmed from a need to review a videotaped interview with one of the children. The interview was obtained through a different, criminal investigation. The State of Utah was hesitant to give Mattingly-Foster a copy of the interview, unsure as to whether she would use the evidence for unsavory reasons. Judge Oddone was assigned to review the tape to determine whether any information contained within had any bearing on the custody case.

=== MN v State ===
Case No. 2005009, 2005 Ut. App. 146

In 2005, a case that originally sat before Judge Oddone was sent to the Utah Court of Appeals. In this situation, Judge Oddone had terminated that parental rights of the defendant, after reviewing the prosecution's evidence of "neglect, unfitness, and failure to remedy the circumstances". The defendant appealed the termination of her parental rights, claiming that the prosecution did not present sufficient evidence to prove the charges. The Utah Court of Appeals upheld Judge Oddone's decision, stating that the juvenile court is given a "'wide latitude of discretion as to the judgments arrived at' based upon not only the court's opportunity to judge credibility firsthand, but also based on the juvenile court judges' 'special training, experience and interest in this field,'".

=== State of Utah, in the interest of L.P., a person under eighteen years of age ===
Case No. 20080396, 2009 Ut. App. 42

In 2009, another of Judge Oddone's cases was appealed to the Utah Court of Appeals. The defendant appealed the Judge's original decision to terminate his parental rights. The Utah Court of Appeals affirmed Judge Oddone's original decision to terminate the parental rights of the father and affirmed the finding that the father was an unfit parent.

== Personal life ==
Judge Oddone is married. The Judge is also an avid basketball fan, making a point of attending every NCAA tournament game held at the University of Utah's Huntsman Center, a tradition dating back to 1979. The Judge also enjoys trout fishing. Judge Oddone is a co-founder of the Utah non-profit, international adoption agency, Children's House International.
