= Gloriæ Dei Cantores =

Choir in Massachusetts, United States

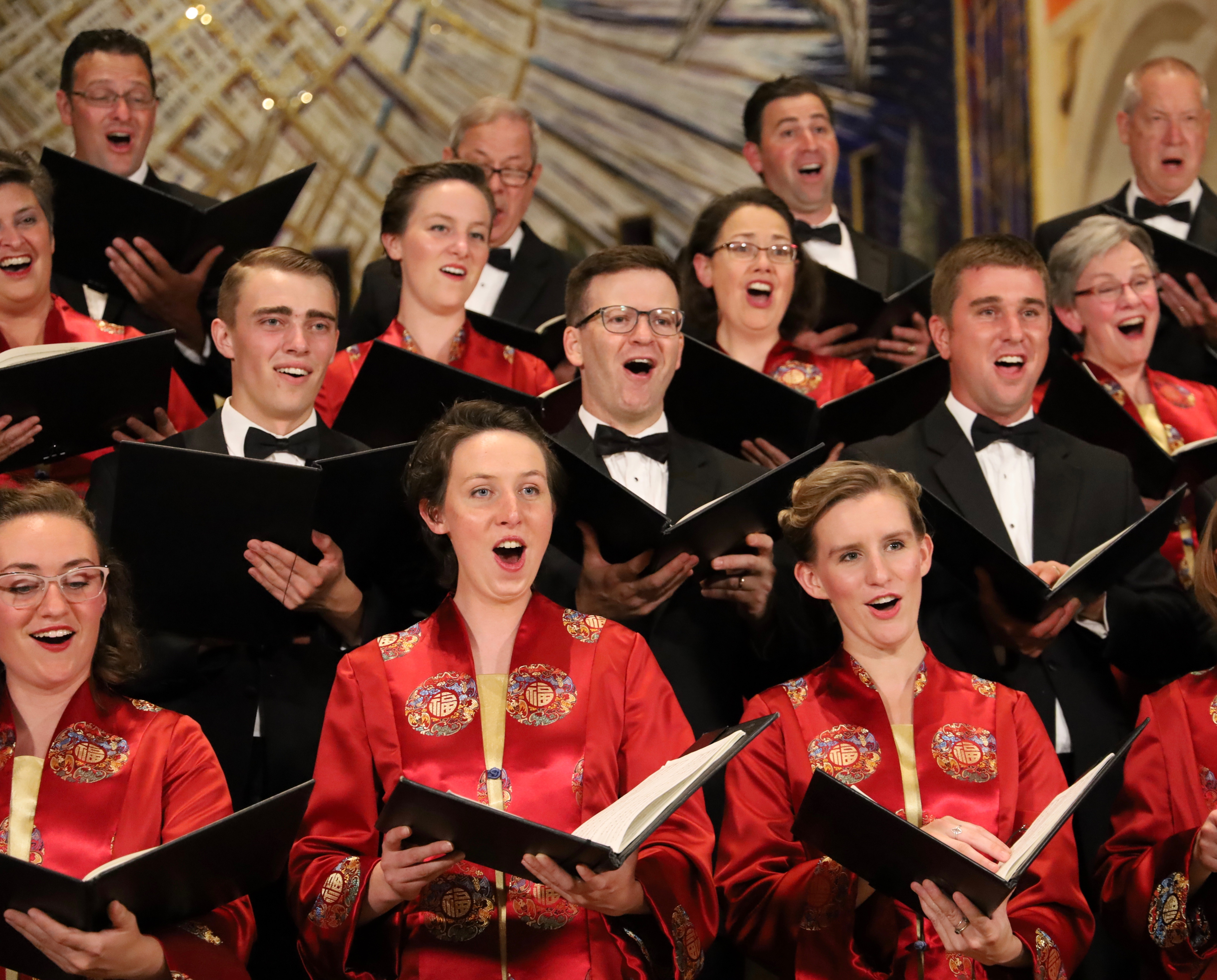
Gloriae Dei Cantores

Gloriæ Dei Cantores (Latin for "Singers to the Glory of God") is a 40-voice choir based in Orleans, Massachusetts under the direction of artistic director and principal conductor Richard K. Pugsley.

== History ==
"Gloriæ Dei Cantores" was founded in 1988 by Elizabeth C. Patterson who served as its Director/Conductor until 2012. It is based at the Church of the Transfiguration in Orleans, Massachusetts. The "Gloriæ Dei Cantores Schola" specializes in Gregorian chant.

The choir sings in 18 languages and has appeared on the concert stage and in recordings with such artists as Gerre Hancock, Keith Lockhart, John Williams, Samuel Adler, Mark O'Connor, Stephen Cleobury, George Guest, Daniel Pinkham, and Margaret Hillis. It has toured in 23 countries in Europe, Asia, and North America.

Highlights of the choir's career under Elizabeth Patterson and current artistic director and principal conductor Richard K. Pugsley include three invitational tours of Russia, the opening of the 900th anniversary of St. Mark's Basilica in Venice, Italy, live radio and television broadcasts with the BBC, film soundtracks, and the tree-lighting ceremony at Rockefeller Plaza.

The choir's collaborative ventures have included ten Holiday Tours with Keith Lockhart and the Boston Pops Orchestra, a sixteen-city US tour of Mozart's Requiem with Philippe Entremont, and the Munich Symphony Orchestra, and performances of Mozart's Requiem with the St. Petersburg Philharmonic in Russia.

In October 2017, the choir and its associated Elements Theatre Company presented at the Church of the Transfiguration Vaughn Williams' opera, The Pilgrim's Progress, to celebrate 500 years of the Protestant Reformation.

Recent concerts have featured Walton's The Twelve, Poulenc's Gloria Duruflé's Requiem, Mozart's Mass in C minor, and Vaughan Williams' Dona Nobis Pacem, in collaboration with soloists Andrew Nolen and Jossie Pérez.

== Discography ==
The choir has released several recordings on its Paraclete Recordings label.

Gordon Myers was Chairman of the Music Department, Columbia College, Columbia, South Carolina, from 1965 to 1968. He wrote a 90-minute choral work, "God's Trombones by James Weldon Johnson" as his doctoral thesis, subsequently published by Eastlane Music Corporation. In 1996, Paraclete Press, the publishing house of the Community of Jesus, acquired the copyright. It was recorded by "Gloriæ Dei Cantores" in the mid-1990s. Using the masters, Paraclete Records prepared them for re-release in 2018. The Gloriæ Dei Cantores choir serves as a chorus to Myers' baritone. C. Michael Bailey, writing for "All That Jazz" recommended the recording calling it, "...a very listenable collection of Bible tales..."

"Alan Hovhaness: From the Ends of the Earth" received a favorable review from Music Web International's Dan Morgan, who noted the acoustics of the Church of the Transfiguration. In reviewing Mozart Rare Choral Works, Michael Cookson said, "...although there are episodes of unsteadiness and one or two uncomfortable vibratos it is hard to find too much fault with their performances." Gregorian chant

- The Chants of Angels
- The Chants of Mary
- The Chants of the Holy Spirit
- The Chants of Easter
- The Chants of Christmas
- The Coming of Christ
- The Beloved Son
- I Am With You
- Gregorian Requiem
- The Chants of Transfiguration

Medieval c. 1150 – c. 1400

- Sacred Songs of France (Vol. I: 1198–1609)

Renaissance c. 1400 – c. 1600

- Masters of the Renaissance
- Giovanni Pierluigi da Palestrina

Baroque c. 1600 – c. 1750

- Peace Be With You

Romantic c. 1830 – c. 1920

- Mendelssohn and Brahms Sacred Motets
- Josef Gabriel Rheinberger: Motets, Masses and Hymms
- Faith of My Heart: Sacred Choral Music of Franz Liszt

20th – 21st centuries c. 1900 – today

- Herbert Howells
- Mandorla: Choral Masterworks of Frank Martin, Martin, Grieg, Hanson
- Edmund Rubbra: The Sacred Muse
- The Doctrine of Wisdom: Sacred Choral Music of William Mathias
- Eclipse: The Voice of Jean Langlais
- A Prophecy of Peace: The Choral Music of Samuel Adler
- Appalachian Sketches
- Leo Sowerby: American Master of Sacred Song
- Aaron Copland and Virgil Thomson: Sacred and Secular Choral Works

Spanish

- Esperanza: A Gift of Spanish Song

Russian

- All Night Vigil, Op.37
- Unto Ages of Ages Sacred Choral Music of Georgy Sviridov, Rachmaninoff, and Tchaikovsky
- Sacred Songs of Russia

Anglican psalmody

- Thou Art My Refuge Psalms of Salvation and Mercy (Vol. I)
- He Has Heard My Voice Psalms of Faithfulness and Hope (Vol. II)
- His Love Endures Forever Psalms of Thankfulness and Praise (Vol. III)

American psalm settings

- Make His Praise Glorious (American Psalmody Vol. I)
- By the Rivers of Babylon (American Psalmody Vol. II)
- The Lord Is My Shepherd (American Psalmody Vol. III)

Compilations and sets

- Eternal Light
- Joy and Gladness
- Paths of Grace
- Aliyah! Israel
- Kaleidoscope: America's Faith in Song
- The Essential Gregorian Chant Collection
- Music of the Renaissance Set
- American Psalmody of the 20th Century

Christmas

- Keeping Christmas
- Sing Noel
- The Chants of Christmas
