= Augusto, Michaela, and Lorenzo Odone =

Family members of Lorenzo Odone

Augusto Odone
- Born: Augusto Daniel Odone; March 6, 1933; Rome, Italy
- Died: October 24, 2013 (aged 80); Acqui Terme, Piedmont, Italy
- Occupation: Economist
- Known for: Inventor of Lorenzo's oil

Michaela Odone
- Born: Michaela Teresa Murphy; January 10, 1939; Yonkers, New York, US
- Died: June 10, 2000 (aged 61); Fairfax, Virginia, US
- Known for: Inventor of Lorenzo's oil

Lorenzo Odone
- Born: Lorenzo Michael Murphy Odone; May 29, 1978; Washington, D.C., U.S
- Died: May 30, 2008 (aged 30); Fairfax, Virginia, U.S
- Known for: Adrenoleukodystrophy patient

Augusto Daniel Odone (March 6, 1933 – October 24, 2013) and Michaela Teresa Murphy Odone (January 10, 1939 – June 10, 2000) were the parents of Lorenzo Michael Murphy Odone (May 29, 1978 – May 30, 2008), who had adrenoleukodystrophy (ALD). They became famous for developing a controversial treatment using Lorenzo's oil for their son's incurable illness. This quest was recounted in the film Lorenzo's Oil (1992). Augusto had previously been an economist for the World Bank.

In recognition of the parents' work, Augusto Odone received an honorary doctorate from the University of Stirling. He continued to raise funds and drive the scientific task force known as The Myelin Project until his death. Michaela Odone battled lung cancer for some time and died on June 10, 2000, at the age of 61.

Lorenzo died the day after his 30th birthday. He was almost totally paralyzed but was, according to his father Augusto, "holding his own". He was unable to speak or move on his own. He communicated by wiggling his fingers and blinking his eyes. His mind was intact and he enjoyed music and having people read to him. He lived with his father in Virginia and was cared for by nurses and his family friend, Oumouri Hassane.

In mid-2010, two years after Lorenzo's death, Augusto Odone sold his home in Virginia and moved to Acqui Terme in his native Italy, near his father's village of Gamalero where he lived when he was young. He died there on October 24, 2013, at the age of 80.

== Background ==
This severe form of adrenoleukodystrophy was first described by Ernst Siemerling and Hans Gerhard Creutzfeldt in 1923. Lorenzo was diagnosed in April 1984, using a new blood test that had been recently developed. At the time, people diagnosed with the disease were usually young boys between 5 and 10 years old, who would gradually become mute, deaf, blind and paralysed before dying, which typically happened within two years due to aspiration or neurological causes.

Augusto and Michaela refused to accept this prognosis as final, and fought to find a treatment for the disease, often conflicting with doctors, specialist and support groups. With the help of Hugo Moser, and through long hours of research and study, the Odones, who had had no previous medical background, came up with a treatment. This treatment involved the consumption of a specially prepared oil, which became known as "Lorenzo's oil". Patients with a related condition, adrenomyeloneuropathy, showed no clinical improvement after being treated with Lorenzo's oil.

The Odones had an important role in developing Lorenzo's oil and in setting up The Myelin Project, which promotes and carries out research on ALD and other similar disorders. Michaela also insisted on continuing to treat her incapacitated son as a human being and not a "vegetable", helping him devise a means of communicating with her and others through the blinking of his eyes and the wiggling of his fingers.

== Cultural depictions ==
The Odones' story was first depicted in the 1990 Italian television film Voglia di vivere, starring Tomas Milian and Dominique Sanda. It was later made into the 1992 film Lorenzo's Oil, in which Augusto was played by Nick Nolte and Michaela by Susan Sarandon, who, through her involvement with the movie, became the spokesperson of The Myelin Project.

The 1994 episode of The Critic entitled "Dr. Jay", in which the main character Jay Sherman works to discover a cure for his boss's terminal disease, was a parody of the story.

A poem Michaela wrote about Lorenzo was set to music by Phil Collins. Titled "Lorenzo", the resulting song was featured on his 1996 album Dance into the Light.
