= Lorenzo's oil =

Mixture of modified vegetable oils used in treating adrenoleukodystrophy

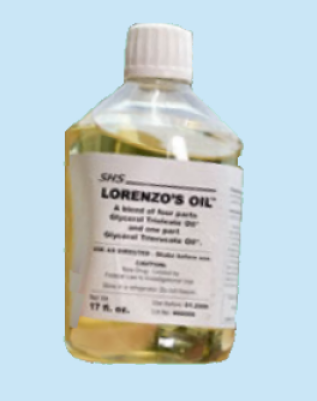
Bottle of Lorenzo's oil

Erucic acid

Oleic acid

The two component oils

Lorenzo's oil is a liquid solution made of 4 parts glycerol trioleate and 1 part glycerol trierucate, which are the triacylglycerol forms of oleic acid and erucic acid. It is prepared from olive oil and rapeseed oil. It is used in the investigational treatment of asymptomatic patients with adrenoleukodystrophy (ALD), a nervous system disorder.

Development of the oil was led by Augusto and Michaela Odone after their son Lorenzo was diagnosed with the disease in 1984, at the age of five. Lorenzo was predicted to die within a few years. His parents sought experimental treatment options, and the initial formulation of the oil was developed by retired British scientist Don Suddaby (formerly of Croda International). Suddaby and his colleague, Keith Coupland, received a U.S. patent (since expired) for invention of the oil. The royalties received by Augusto were paid to The Myelin Project which he and Michaela founded to further research treatments for ALD and similar disorders. The Odones and their invention obtained widespread publicity in 1992 because of the film Lorenzo's Oil.

Research on the effectiveness of Lorenzo's oil has seen mixed results, with possible benefit for asymptomatic ALD patients but of unpredictable or no benefit to those with symptoms, suggesting its possible role as a preventative measure in families identified as ALD dominant. Lorenzo Odone died on May 30, 2008, at the age of 30; he was bedridden with paralysis and died from aspiration pneumonia, likely caused by having inhaled food.

== Treatment cost ==
In 2012, Lorenzo's oil cost approximately $400 USD for a month's treatment.

== Proposed mechanism of action ==
The mixture of fatty acids purportedly reduces the levels of very long chain fatty acids (VLCFAs), which are elevated in ALD. It does so by competitively inhibiting the enzyme that forms VLCFAs.

== Effectiveness ==
Lorenzo's oil, in combination with a diet low in VLCFA, has been investigated for its possible effects on the progression of ALD. Clinical results have been mixed and the use of Lorenzo's oil has been controversial due to uncertainties regarding its clinical efficacy and the clinical indications for its use.

Hugo Moser played a prominent role in both the treatment of Lorenzo Odone and the scientific evaluation of Lorenzo's oil. In 2005, Moser published a controlled study concluding that Lorenzo's oil does not alter the course of the illness in symptomatic patients, but asymptomatic patients had a reduced risk of developing ALD while on the dietary therapy. Moser appraised Lorenzo's oil again in a 2007 report.

Moser's findings, that Lorenzo's oil did not help symptomatic ALD patients, are consistent with prior studies published in 2003 and 1999.

A study by Poulos published in 1994 found that Lorenzo's oil is of limited value in correcting the accumulation of saturated VLCFAs in the brain of patients with ALD. Comparative autopsies showed that treatment enriched erucic acid in plasma and tissues, but not in the brain.

== Side effects ==
The oil has been shown to cause a lowered platelet count, which can lead to thrombocytopenia and lymphopenia.

There are no reports of toxicity from dietary consumption of erucic acid.

== Current state ==
Dietary manipulation using Lorenzo's oil has been shown to lower blood levels of very long chain fatty acids, but it is ineffective in symptomatic ALD. Moser's 2005 study has found "strongly suggestive, albeit not fully definitive, evidence of a preventive effect" of Lorenzo's oil on the onset of symptoms when used by asymptomatic patients.
