= Adrenoleukodystrophy =

Genetic neurological disease

- Other names: X-linked adrenoleukodystrophy, ALD, X-ALD, Siemerling–Creutzfeldt disease, bronze Schilder disease
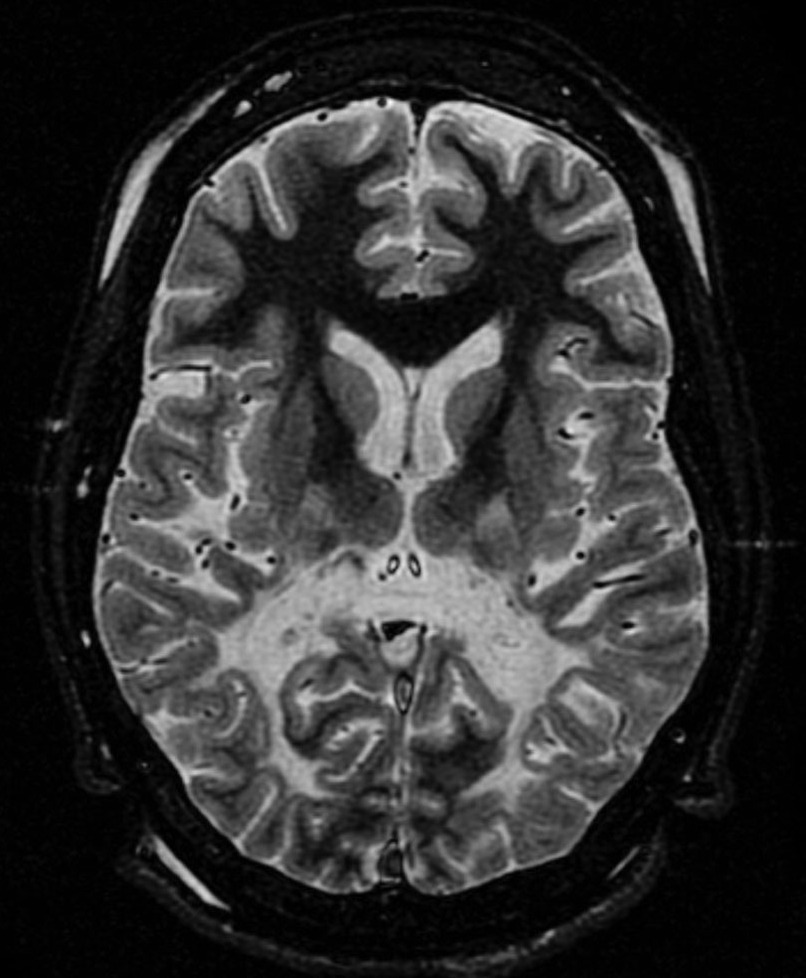
- White matter, with reduced volume and increased signal intensity. The anterior white matter is spared. Features are consistent with X-linked adrenoleukodystrophy.
- Pronunciation: /-ˌljuːkoʊˈdɪstrəfi/
- Specialty: Medical genetics
- Types: X-Linked ALD
- Frequency: 0.0005%

Adrenoleukodystrophy (ALD) is a disease linked to the X chromosome. It is a result of fatty acid buildup caused by failure of peroxisomal fatty acid beta oxidation which results in the accumulation of very long chain fatty acids in tissues throughout the body. The most severely affected tissues are the myelin in the central nervous system, the adrenal cortex, and the Leydig cells in the testes. The long chain fatty acid buildup causes damage to the myelin sheath of the neurons of the brain, resulting in seizures and hyperactivity. Other symptoms include problems in speaking, listening, and understanding verbal instructions.

Clinically, ALD presents as a heterogeneous disorder, showing several distinct phenotypes, and no clear pattern of genotype–phenotype correlation. As an X-linked disorder, ALD presents more frequently and severely in males; however, approximately 80% of heterozygote females show some symptoms later in life. Approximately one third of male ALD patients will present with the childhood cerebral form of the disease, which is the most severe form. It is characterized by normal development in early childhood, followed by rapid degeneration to a vegetative state. The other forms of ALD vary in timing of onset and in clinical severity, ranging from adrenal insufficiency alone to progressive paraparesis in early adulthood.

ALD is caused by mutations in ABCD1, a gene located on the X chromosome that codes for ALD, a peroxisomal membrane transporter protein. The exact mechanism of the pathogenesis of the various forms of ALD is not known. Biochemically, individuals with ALD show very high levels of unbranched, saturated, very long chain fatty acids, particularly cerotic acid (26:0). The level of cerotic acid in plasma does not correlate with clinical presentation. Treatment options for ALD are limited. For the childhood cerebral form, stem cell transplant and gene therapy are options if the disease is detected early in the clinical course. Adrenal insufficiency in ALD patients can be successfully treated. ALD is the most common peroxisomal inborn error of metabolism, with a minimum estimated incidence of 1:42,000 for hemizygotes and 1:16,800 for hemizygotes and heterozygotes, though the incidence is likely to increase with improved newborn screening. It does not have a significantly higher incidence in any specific ethnic group.

== Signs and symptoms ==
ALD can present in different ways. The different presentations are complicated by the pattern of X-linked recessive inheritance. There have been seven phenotypes described in males with ABCD1 mutations and five in females. Initial symptoms in boys affected with the childhood cerebral form of ALD include emotional instability, hyperactivity and disruptive behavior at school. Older patients affected with the cerebral form will present with similar symptoms. Untreated, cerebral ALD is characterized by progressive demyelination leading to a vegetative state and death. Adult males with an adrenomyeloneuropathy presentation typically present initially with muscle stiffness, paraparesis and sexual dysfunction. All patients with clinically recognized ALD phenotypes are at risk for adrenal insufficiency. There is no reliable way to predict which form of the disease an affected individual will develop, with multiple phenotypes being demonstrated within families. Onset of adrenal insufficiency is often the first symptom, appearing as early as two years of age.

=== Asymptomology ===
There are documented asymptomatic males who present no ALD symptoms well into their 60s and 70s. It's not understood how they can have an ABCD1 gene variant and possess elevated VLCFAs and not exhibit either Cerebral ALD, Adrenal Insufficiency, or Adrenomyeloneuropathy symptoms. Daughters of asymptomatic males become obligate carriers, who may themselves be asymptomatic and who can pass the variant onto their children, which then silently perpetuates ALD. Sons of asymptomatic males only receive their father's Y chromosome and therefore can't inherit ALD.

=== Male adrenoleukodystrophy phenotypes ===
Male adrenoleukodystrophy phenotypes
Phenotype	Description	Onset	Approximate relative frequency
Childhood cerebral	Progressive neurodegenerative decline, leading to a vegetative state without treatment	3–10 years	31–35%
Adolescent	Similar to childhood cerebral, with a slower progression	11–21 years	4–7%
Adrenomyeloneuropathy (AMN)	Progressive neuropathy, paraparesis; approximately 40% progress to cerebral involvement	21–37 years	40–46%
Adult cerebral	Dementia, behavioral disturbances, similar progression to childhood cerebral form, but without preceding AMN phenotype	Adulthood	2–5%
Olivo-ponto-cerebellar	Cerebral and brain stem involvement	Adolescence to adulthood	1–2%
"Addison disease only"	Adrenal insufficiency	Before 7.5 years	Up to 50% in childhood, varies with age
Asymptomatic	No clinical presentation, further studies can reveal subclinical adrenal insufficiency or mild AMN phenotype	Most common phenotype in boys under four years of age	Proportion of asymptomatic patients decreases with age

=== Female adrenoleukodystrophy phenotypes ===
Female adrenoleukodystrophy phenotypes
Phenotype	Description	Onset	Approximate relative frequency
Asymptomatic	No neurologic or adrenal involvement	Most women under 30 do not have any neurologic involvement	Diminishes with age
Mild myelopathy	Increased deep tendon reflexes, sensory changes in lower extremities	Adulthood	Approximately 50% of women over 40 years of age who carry the gene
Moderate to severe myeloneuropathy	Similar to male AMN phenotype, but later onset and milder presentation	Adulthood	Approximately 15% of women over 40 years of age who carry the gene
Cerebral involvement	Progressive dementia and decline	Rare in childhood, more common in adults	~2% of women who carry the gene, and/or women with the mutation on both X chromosomes
Adrenal involvement	Primary adrenal insufficiency	Any age	~1% of women who carry the gene, and/or women with the mutation on both X chromosomes

== Genetics ==
Illustration of the position of the ABCD1 gene in the chromosome.

ALD is caused by mutations in ABCD1, located at Xq28 and demonstrates X-linked recessive inheritance. The gene ABCD1 encodes a peroxisomal membrane transporter which is responsible for transporting very long chain fatty acid substrate into the peroxisomes for degradation. Mutations in this gene that interfere with this process cause this syndrome.

Males with an ABCD1 mutation are hemizygous, as they only have a single X chromosome. Female carriers will typically avoid the most severe manifestations of the disease, but often become symptomatic later in life. Although the detection of an ABCD1 mutation identifies an individual who is affected with a form of ALD, there is no genotype–phenotype correlation. Within a family, there will often be several different phenotypes, despite the presence of the same causative mutation. In one case, a family with six affected members displayed five different phenotypes. There are no common mutations that cause ALD, most are private or familial. Almost 600 different mutations have been identified, approximately half are missense mutations, one quarter are frameshifts, with in-frame deletions and splicing defects making up the remainder. The incidence of new mutations in ALD (those occurring spontaneously, rather than being inherited from a carrier parent) is estimated at 4.1%, with the possibility that these are due to germline mosaicism.

== Pathogenesis ==
The exact cause for the varied collection of symptoms found in the different ALD phenotypes is not clear. The white matter of the brain, the Leydig cells of the testes and the adrenal cortex are the most severely affected systems. The excess VLCFA can be detected in almost all tissues of the body, despite the localization of symptoms. The lack of Coenzyme A does not permit the disintegration of the VLCFA, accumulating the same in the white matter, adrenal glands, and the testes more specifically in the Leydig cells not allowing the proper function of these organs. Successful treatment of the demyelination process that affects the brain with either stem cell transplant or gene therapy does not immediately normalize the VLCFA levels in body tissues. The levels of VLCFA can be normalized by treatment with Lorenzo's oil, but this does not alter the progression of the disease. It is unclear whether the accumulation of VLCFA is associated with the pathogenesis of the disease in a specific way, or if it is a biochemical phenotype, useful for identification. Several studies link inflammation from viral infection or head trauma to development or worsening of symptoms.

== Diagnosis ==
The clinical presentation of ALD can vary greatly, making diagnosis difficult. With the variety of phenotypes, clinical suspicion of ALD can result from a variety of different presentations. Symptoms vary based on the disease phenotype, and even within families or between twins. When ALD is suspected based on clinical symptoms, the initial testing usually includes plasma very long chain fatty acid (VLCFA) determination using gas chromatography-mass spectrometry. The concentration of unsaturated VLCFA, particularly 26 carbon chains is significantly elevated in males with ALD, even prior to the development of other symptoms. Confirmation of ALD after positive plasma VLCFA determination usually involves molecular genetic analysis of ABCD1. In females, where plasma VLCFA measurement is not always conclusive (some female carriers will have normal VLCFA in plasma), molecular analysis is preferred, particularly in cases where the mutation in the family is known. Although the clinical phenotype is highly variable among affected males, the elevations of VLCFA are present in all males with an ABCD1 mutation.

Because the characteristic elevations associated with ALD are present at birth, well before any symptoms are apparent, there have been methods developed in the interests of including it in newborn screening programs. One of the difficulties with ALD as a disease included in universal newborn screening is the difficulty in predicting the eventual phenotype that an individual will express. The accepted treatment for affected boys presenting with the cerebral childhood form of the disease is a bone marrow transplant, a procedure which carries significant risks. However, because most affected males will demonstrate adrenal insufficiency, early discovery and treatment of this symptom could potentially prevent complications and allow these patients to be monitored for other treatment in the future, depending on the progression of their disease.

The Loes score is a rating of the severity of abnormalities in the brain found on MRI. It ranges from 0 to 34, based on a point system derived from the location and extent of disease and the presence of atrophy in the brain, either localized to specific points or generally throughout the brain. A Loes score of 0.5 or less is classified as normal, while a Loes score of 14 or greater is considered severe. It was developed by neuroradiologist Daniel J. Loes MD and is an important tool in assessing disease progression and the effectiveness of therapy.

== Treatments ==
=== Dietary therapy ===
Initial attempts at dietary therapy in ALD involved restricting the intake of very-long chain fatty acids (VLCFA). Dietary intake is not the only source for VLCFA in the body, as they are also synthesized endogenously. This dietary restriction did not impact the levels of VLCFA in plasma and other body tissues. After the realization that endogenous synthesis was an important contribution to VLCFA in the body, efforts at dietary therapy shifted to inhibiting these synthetic pathways in the body. The parents of Lorenzo Odone, a boy with ALD, spearheaded efforts to develop a dietary treatment to slow the progression of the disease. They developed a mixture of unsaturated fatty acids (glycerol trioleate and glyceryl trierucate in a 4:1 ratio), known as Lorenzo's oil that inhibits elongation of saturated fatty acids in the body. Supplementation with Lorenzo's oil has been found to normalize the VLCFA concentrations in the body, although its effectiveness at treating the cerebral manifestations of the disease is still controversial and unproven. Trials with Lorenzo's oil have shown that it does not stop the neurological degradation in symptomatic patients, nor does it improve adrenal function, but asymptomatic patients, and speculatively AMN variants without cerebral involvement, as well as female carriers may benefit from early intake of oleic and erucic acids in addition to VLCFA restriction.

Adrenomix®: In 2009, a second-generation mixture was created, adding to the glycerol trioleate (GTO) and trierucate glycerol (GTE), conjugated linoleic acid (CLA) a group of linoleic acid isomers capable of overcoming the blood-brain barrier. CLA, through the activation of peroxisome beta oxidation, increases the catabolism of pro-inflammatory molecules and ROS, acting as an anti-inflammatory and antioxidant. The use of CLA was initially considered in relation to the ability to inhibit fatty acid synthase together with a hypolipidic diet. A group of Italian researchers of the Bambino Gesù Pediatric Hospital in Rome , Associazione Biomedicina e Nutrizione from Milan and Cagliari, showed that the administration of Adrenomix (GTO, GTE and CLA), in addition to decreasing levels of VLCFA throughout the body, reduces neuro inflammation and improves somatosensory evoked potential, found unchanged or worsened with only administration of GTO and GTE.

Aldixyl®: In 2016, based on studies developed in recent years in the field of adrenoleukodystrophy and adrenomyelouropathy, a mixture was developed that adds to GTO, GTE and CLA, a mixture of powerful antioxidants at high dosages containing alpha lipoic acid (ALA), reduced L- glutathione and Vitamin E (α- tocopherol). Researchers at the IDIBELL- Hospital Duran i Reynals in Barcelona have shown that the early administration of a cocktail of powerful antioxidants, able to overcome the blood-brain barrier and thus carry out its activity at the CNS level, prevents the oxidative stress typical of the disease, intervenes on the initial axonal dysfunctions and therefore on locomotor damage. This new mixture, unlike what happened with the administration of GTO and GTE alone, poorly accumulated at the level of the nervous system, enhances the anti-inflammatory activity and reduces the levels of VLCFA in the CNS by combining synergistically the activity of its components. In particular, CLA, in addition to overcoming the blood-brain barrier and regulating at the CNS level the metabolism of VLCFA is able to influence the catabolism of pro-inflammatory eicosanoids and lipid peroxidation products. In this sense, the anti-inflammatory activity of ALA, reduced L-glutathione and Vitamin E is enhanced at the level of the whole body, and not only at the peripheral level as was the case in the past.

=== Transplant ===
While dietary therapy has been shown to be effective to normalize the very-long chain fatty acid concentrations in the plasma of individuals with ALD, allogeneic hematopoietic stem cell transplants is the only treatment that can stop demyelination that is the hallmark of the cerebral forms of the disease. In order to be effective, the transplant must be done at an early stage of the disease; if the demyelination has progressed, transplant can worsen the outcome, and increase the rate of decline. While transplants have been shown to be effective at halting the demyelination process in those presenting with the childhood cerebral form of ALD, follow-up of these patients has shown that it does not improve adrenal function.

=== Gene therapy ===
For patients where an appropriate match for a transplant cannot be found, there have been investigations into the use of gene therapy. Appropriate vectors are selected and modified to express wild type ABCD1, which is then transplanted into the patients using a similar procedure as for a bone marrow or stem cell transplant. Gene therapy has only been tried on a small number of patients, mainly in France. These patients were only considered for gene therapy after there was no HLA match for a traditional transplant. In two reported cases, the gene therapy was successful, with a resolution of the demyelination process up to two years after the procedure. Although the gene therapy was successful in resolving the neurological symptoms, plasma VLCFA levels remained elevated.

Elivaldogene autotemcel is pending authorization by the European Commission as of May 2021. While this treatment is effective with 90% of patients being free of major functional disabilities after treatment, it costs $3.0 million per treatment and it comes with several adverse effects including mucositis and alopecia. There are also reports of hematologic cancer development in patients receiving this gene therapy, including myelodysplastic syndrome and acute myeloid leukemia.

=== Drugs ===
The anti-diabetic medication pioglitazone was shown in a mouse model of ALD to be effective at treating the metabolic effects of ALD, including metabolic failure and increased oxidative stress. Pioglitazone was also shown to prevent axonal degeneration and increase mitochondria levels, as well as stop the progression of locomotor decline in ALD model mice. Subsequently, the experimental drug leriglitazone has been developed as a more brain penetrant metabolite of pioglitazone. As of 2023, leriglitazone is in phase 2/3 clinical trials for adult and childhood cALD in the USA and the EU, and has completed a clinical trial for AMN.

=== Adrenal insufficiency ===
Treatment of the adrenal insufficiency that can accompany any of the common male phenotypes of ALD does not resolve any of the neurological symptoms. Hormone replacement is standard for ALD patients demonstrating adrenal insufficiency. Adrenal insufficiency does not resolve with successful transplant; most patients still require hormone replacement.

== Epidemiology ==
ALD has not been shown to have an increased incidence in any specific country or ethnic group. In the United States, the incidence of affected males is estimated at 1:21,000. Overall incidence of hemizygous males and carrier females is estimated at 1:16,800. The reported incidence in France is estimated at 1:22,000.
