= Yale Daily News =

Student newspaper at Yale University

The Yale Daily News
- The Oldest College Daily
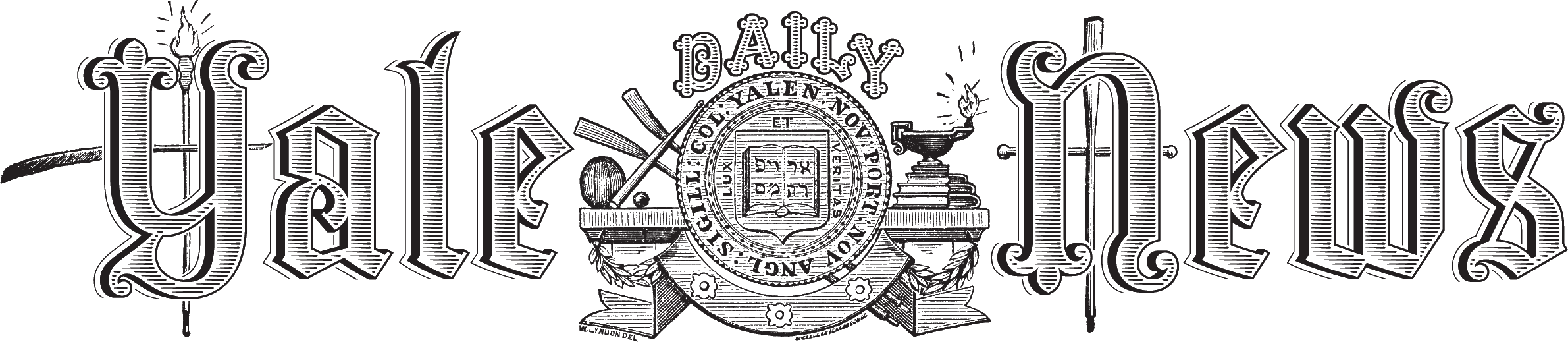
- Nameplate used since 1881

- Yale Daily News, April 15, 2022
- Type: Daily student newspaper
- Format: Broadsheet
- School: Yale University
- Owner: Yale Daily News Publishing Company
- Publisher: Henry Hoak
- Editor-in-chief: Asher Boiskin
- Managing editor: Olivia Woo, Jaeha Jang, Reeti Malhotra
- Founded: January 28, 1878; 148 years ago
- Headquarters: 202 York Street, New Haven, Connecticut 06511
- City: New Haven, Connecticut
- Country: United States
- ISSN: 0890-2240
- Website: yaledailynews.com
- Free online archives: ydnhistorical.library.yale.edu

The Yale Daily News is a student newspaper published by students at Yale University, an Ivy League university in New Haven, Connecticut, United States since 1878. It is the oldest independent college daily newspaper in the United States.

== Description ==
Financially and editorially independent of Yale University since its founding, the Yale Daily News is published online by a student editorial and business staff Monday through Friday, in addition to Tuesday and Friday print editions, during Yale's academic year. Called the YDN, or sometimes the News, the Daily News, or the Daily Yalie, the newspaper is produced in Briton Hadden Memorial Building at 202 York Street in New Haven and printed off-site at Valley Publishing Company in Derby, Connecticut.

Each day, reporters, mainly freshmen and sophomores, cover the university, the city of New Haven and sometimes the state of Connecticut. Besides updating its website with new stories five days a week, the News sends out daily, weekend and breaking news newsletters and posts its contents to social media.

The News also publishes a daily opinion section, a Friday "WKND" section, and special issues for the incoming freshman class, Yale's Class Day and Commencement, The Game against Harvard University, and the experiences of Latinx, Black and Asian students in October, February and April, respectively.

Staff members generally serve as editors on the managing board during their junior year. A single chairman led the editorial and business sides of the News until 1970. Since then, the editor-in-chief also serves as president of the Yale Daily News Publishing Company, while the publisher oversees business operations.

=== Multimedia ===
In addition to the newspaper, the Yale Daily News Publishing Company publishes the Yale Daily News Magazine, video news via YTV, and numerous podcast series.

== History ==
=== 19th century ===
In its inaugural edition on January 28, 1878, the newspaper's first editors wrote: "The innovation which we begin by this morning's issue is justified by the dullness of the times, and the demand for news among us."

The News calls itself the "oldest college daily" in the United States, a claim contested by numerous college student newspapers. Most accurately put, the News is the oldest independent college daily.

- The Harvard Crimson calls itself "the oldest continuously published college daily", but it was founded as a fortnightly publication called The Magenta and did not appear daily until 1883. The News ceased publishing briefly during World War I and World War II after editors volunteered for military service.
- Columbia Daily Spectator, founded one year earlier than the News in 1877, calls itself the second-oldest college daily after The Crimson, but was not independent from Columbia University until 1962.
- The Cornell Daily Sun calls itself the "oldest independent college newspaper", notwithstanding its founding in 1880, two years later than the News'.
- The Daily Californian at the University of California, Berkeley, was founded in 1871 but did not achieve independence until 1971.
- The Daily Targum at Rutgers University was founded in 1869 did not gain independence from the University until 1980 and was initially a monthly newspaper.
- The Dartmouth at Dartmouth College, which opened in 1799 as the Dartmouth Gazette, calls itself the oldest college newspaper, though not the oldest daily.

Front page of the first issue of the Yale Daily News, then called Yale News, published January 28, 1878

=== 20th century ===
In 1920, the News began to report on national news and viewpoints. In 1940 and 1955, when professional dailies were not operating due to unrest among its workers, the News continued to report on national topics.

From 1968 to 1970, the News published a cartoon strip called Bull Tales by Garry Trudeau '70, parodying the exploits of Yale quarterback Brian Dowling. The strip which was reborn as Doonesbury and syndicated in newspapers nationwide for decades.

During the student strike of 1970, in response to the U.S. expansion of the Vietnam War into Cambodia, the Yale Daily News announced that it did not support involvement in the student strikes occurring across the nation, making it the only Ivy League college newspaper to disagree with the protests. In response, fifty pro-strike demonstrators visited the News offices and called the editors 'fascist pigs'. In its editorial, the Yale Daily News warned that "radical rhetoric and sporadic violence, such as marked the weekend demonstrations at Yale, only added fuel to the 'demagoguery of Richard Nixon, Spiro Agnew, John Mitchell and the other hyenas of the right.'"

When women first arrived at Yale College in the fall of 1969, the News was one of Yale's first meaningfully coed student organizations. Within weeks, the newspaper published bylined articles by five women—Dori Zaleznik, Shelley Fisher (now Fishkin), Martha Wasson, Linda Temoshok (now Lydia Temoshok), and Ruth Falk. That first year, Fisher and Zaleznik were elected to the 1971 Editorial Board and Falk and Temoshok to the 1972 Editorial Board.

The News was also among the first student organizations to elect women to leadership roles at Yale. Zaleznik was elected Associate Executive Editor in 1970. Amy Oshinsky became the first female publisher in 1975. Anne ("Andy") Perkins was elected the first female editor-in-chief in 1979.

The News survived for a century solely on income generated by subscriptions and ad sales. But by the mid 1970s, its Gothic building on the Yale campus had fallen into disrepair and help was needed to maintain it.

In 1978, a group of News alumni including Eric Nestler '76, Jonathan Rose '63, Jim Ottaway '60, and Joseph Leiberman '64 created the Oldest College Daily Foundation to solicit philanthropic support for building repairs and capital expenditures.

In February 1995, the News began publishing online.

=== 21st century ===
The News has won numerous awards for its design and editorial content. Its November 5, 2008 front page design regarding Barack Obama's victory in the 2008 Presidential Election was featured in the Poynter Institute book: President Obama Election 2008: Collection of Newspaper Front Pages by the Poynter Institute.

In 2009, the Yale Daily News won the Associated Collegiate Press Newspaper Pacemaker Award.

On September 10 of that year, the News broke the news of the murder of Annie Le, a Yale graduate student reported missing and subsequently found murdered in the basement of her laboratory.

In summer 2010, the 78-year-old Briton Hadden Memorial Building was renovated, increasing the amount of usable space in the basement and adding a multimedia studio in the heart of the newsroom.

In 2018, the Foundation changed its name to the Yale Daily News Foundation and now provides financial support to News staffers who would otherwise need to take paying jobs during the academic year and staffers taking low-paying journalism jobs during the summer. The News student staff continues to be responsible for all editorial and business decisions.

On November 21, 2019, the News published an article detailing allegations of impropriety and sexual misconduct against Brendan Faherty, the Yale women's soccer coach, by former players when he was coach of the women's soccer team at the University of New Haven from 2002 to 2009. Yale announced Faherty's departure the same day.

The News transitioned during the COVID-19 pandemic in 2020 to a weekly print schedule with only a Friday paper.

The Sterling Memorial Library at Yale University has an extensive Yale Daily News Historical Archive, containing digitized versions of printed issues from 1878 through 2020. Digitization of issues from 2021 through the present is currently underway. The collection is indexed, searchable and available to the public.

The News updated its website design in January 2026. The paper started twice weekly print in February 2026 with print issues on Tuesdays and Fridays.

== Alumni ==
The News serves as a training ground for journalists at Yale, and has produced a steady stream of professional reporters who work at newspapers, magazines and websites including The Washington Post, The Wall Street Journal, The New York Times, The Los Angeles Times, Time, Newsweek, The New Yorker, The Economist, ProPublica and Politico.

Yale Daily News alumni have also pioneered new forms of American journalism. Shortly after graduating from Yale, classmates and rivals Briton Hadden '20 and Henry Luce '20 co-founded Time Inc. and its magazine empire. In 2010, Paul Steiger '64, the longtime managing editor of The Wall Street Journal, co-founded ProPublica Inc., a nonprofit online newsroom that has won six Pulitzer Prizes for investigative journalism.

=== Politics ===
Notable Yale Daily News alumni in politics include:

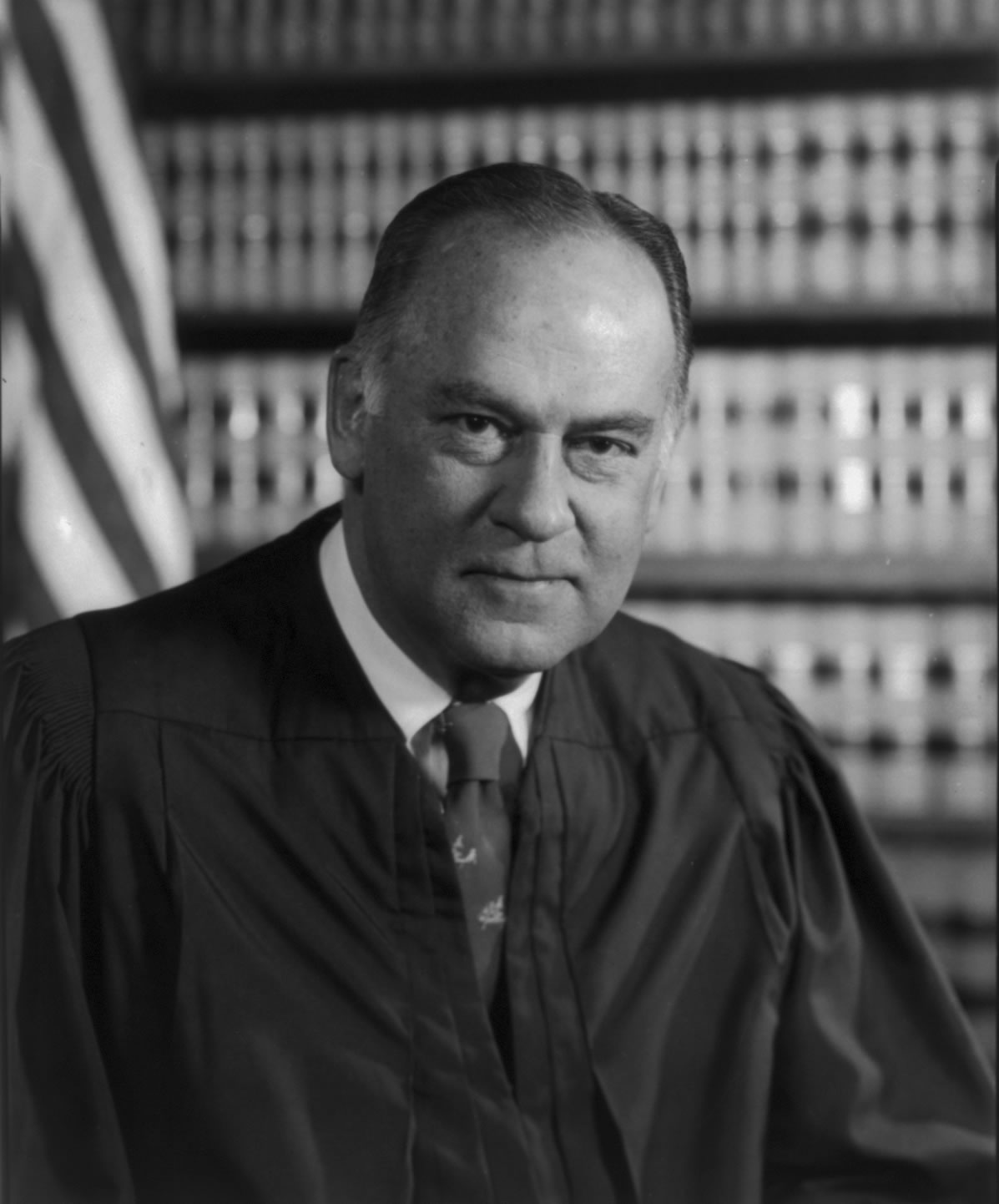
Potter Stewart, former Supreme Court associate justice

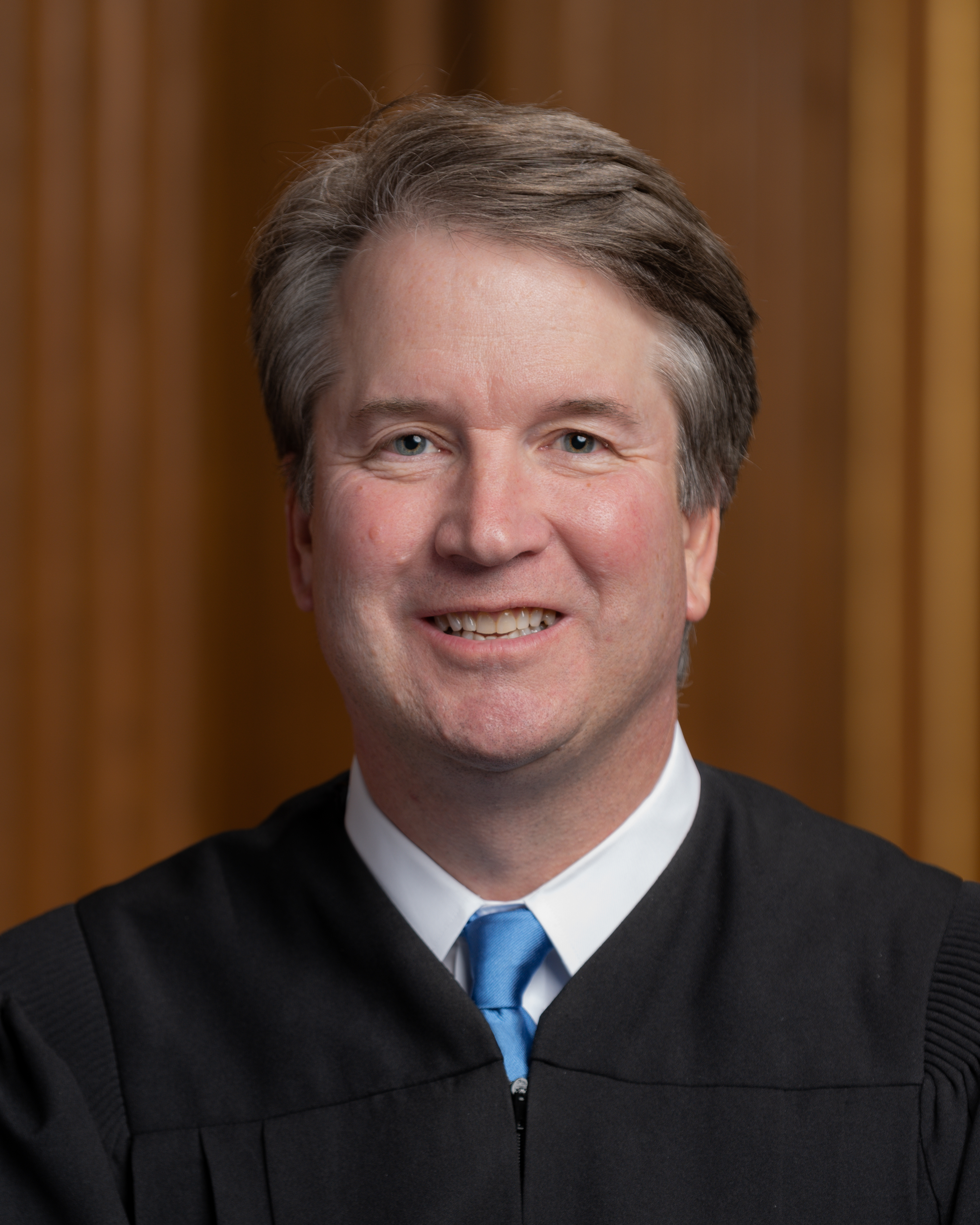
Brett Kavanaugh, Supreme Court associate Justice

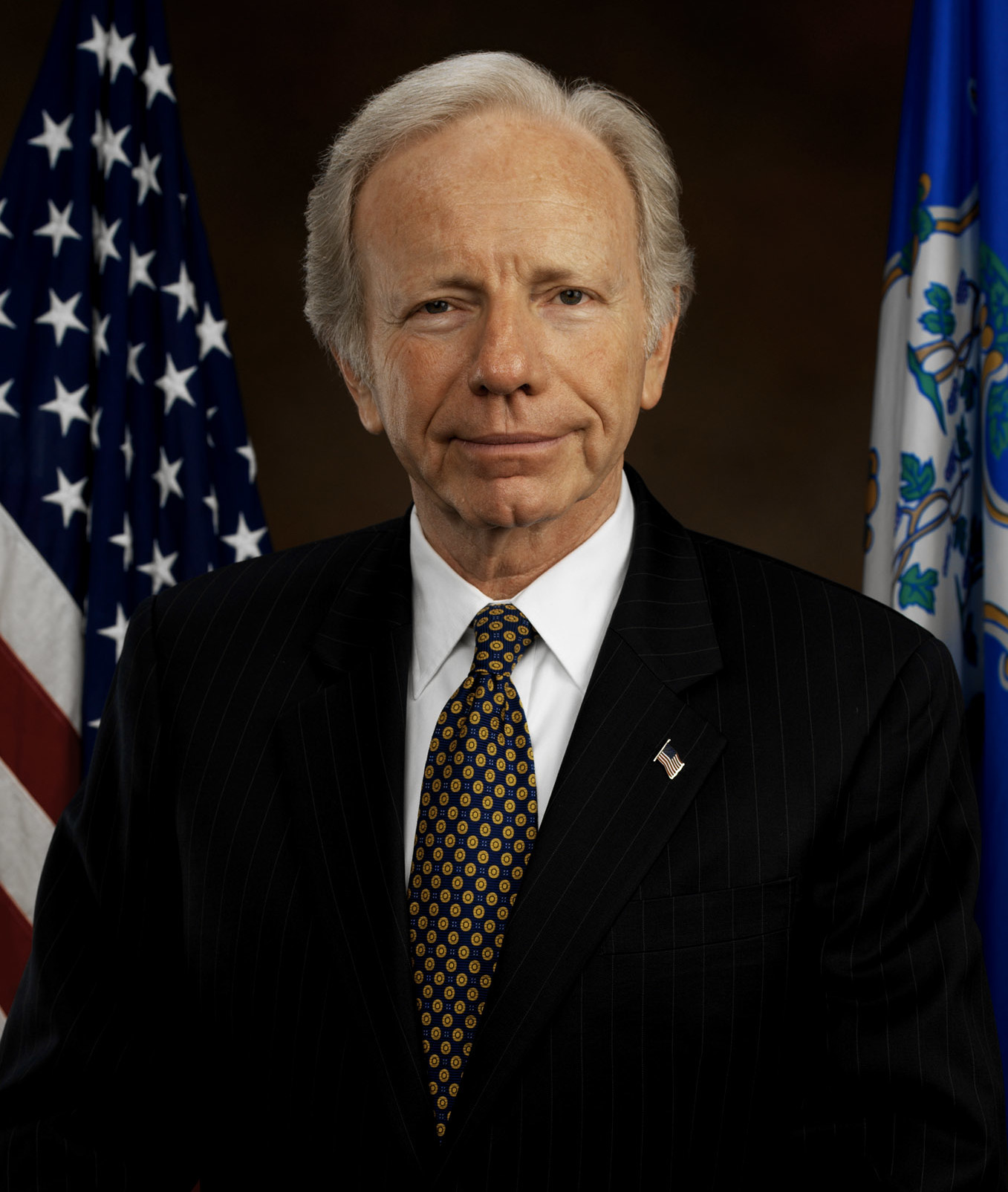
Joseph Lieberman, former US Senator from Connecticut, 2000 Vice Presidential nominee and 2004 presidential candidate

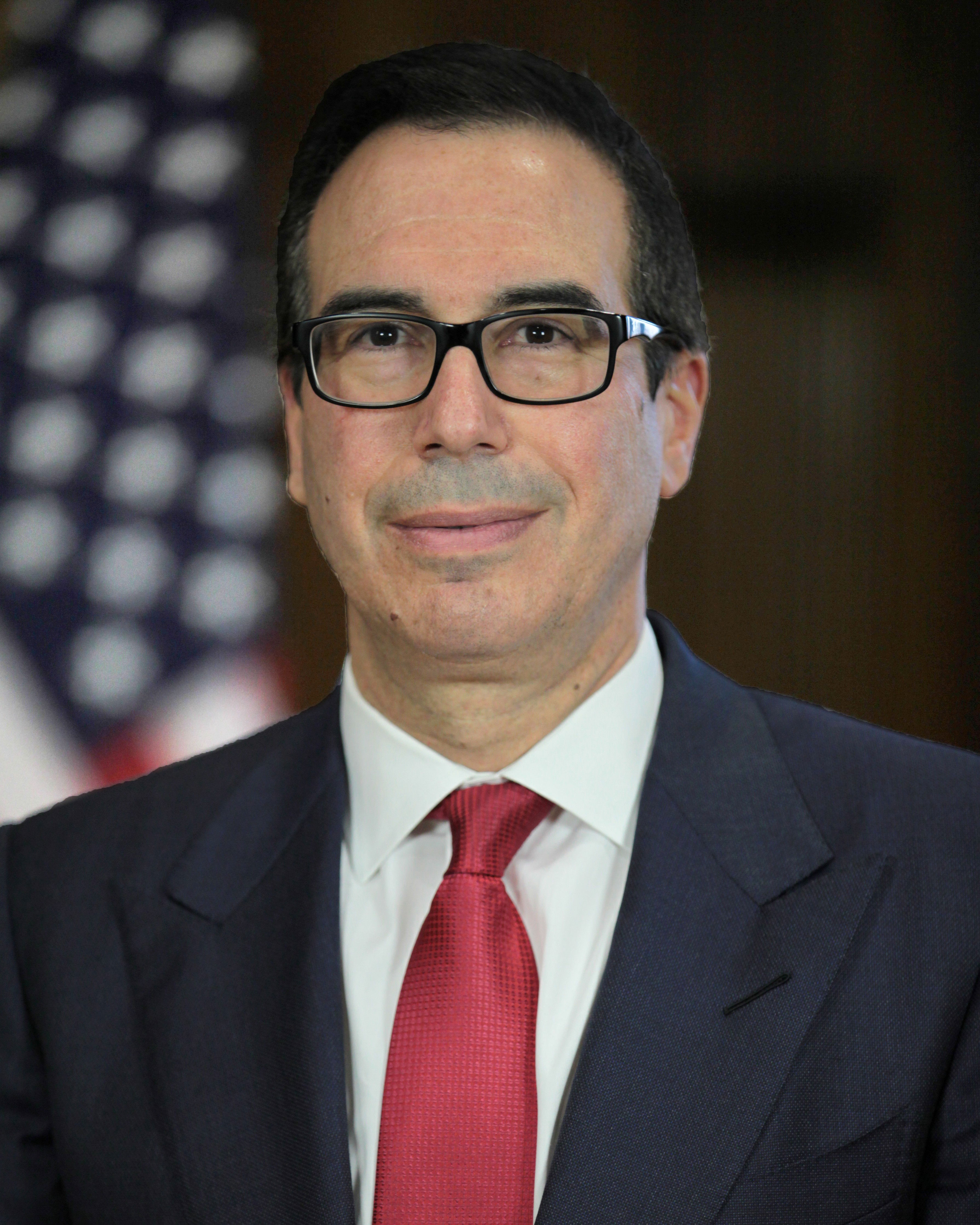
Steve Mnuchin, Secretary of the Treasury under former President Donald Trump

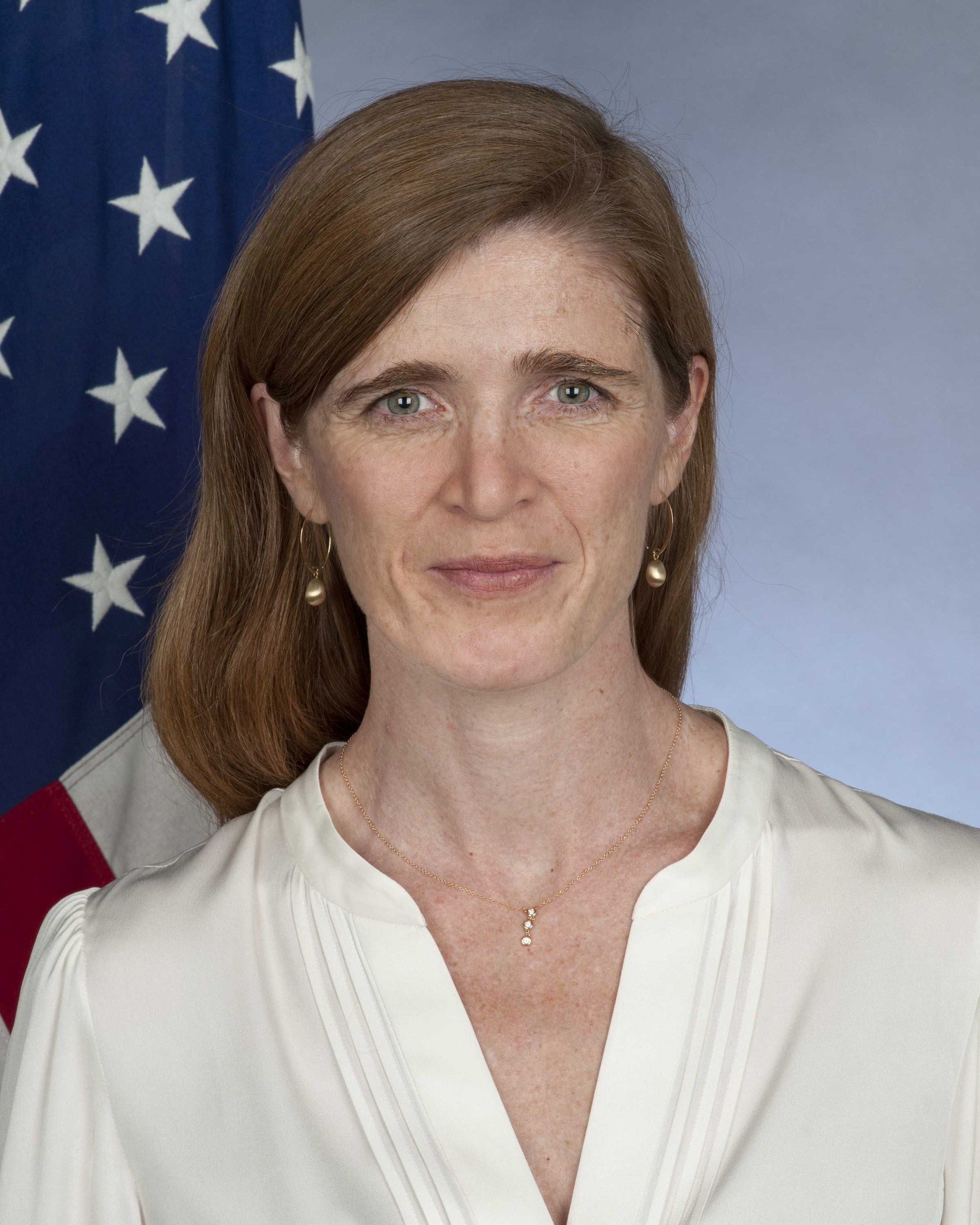
Samantha Power, former United States Ambassador to the United Nations, USAID Director

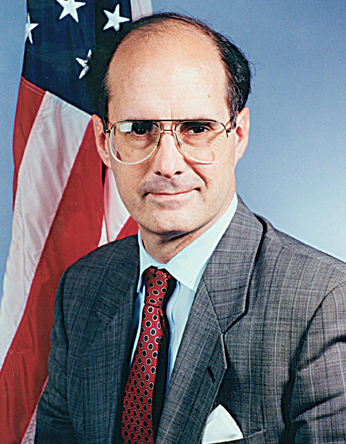
Strobe Talbott, president of the Brookings Institution and former Deputy Secretary of State under President Clinton

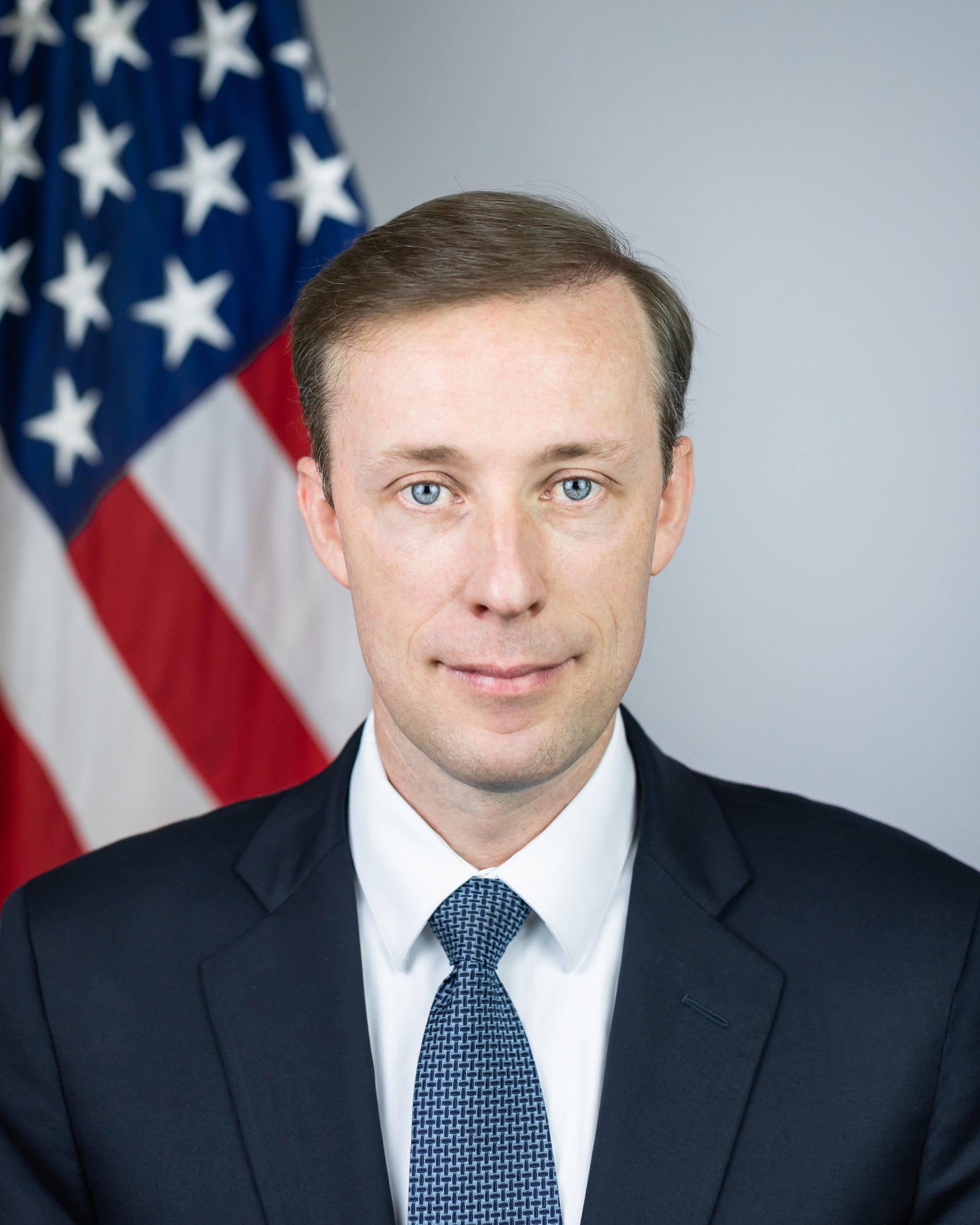
Jake Sullivan, national security advisor to President Joseph Biden

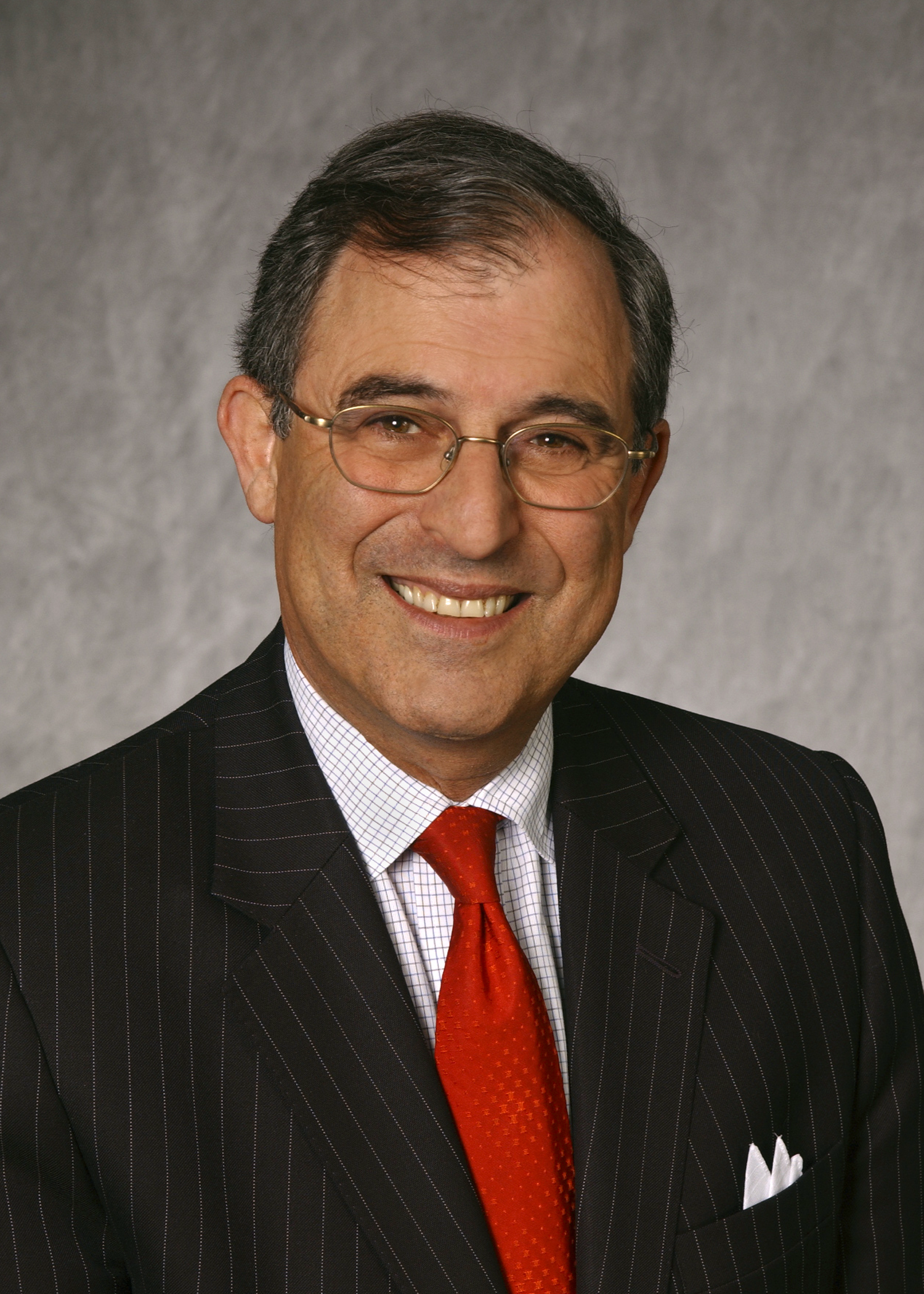
Lanny Davis, advisor to President Clinton, author and public relations expert

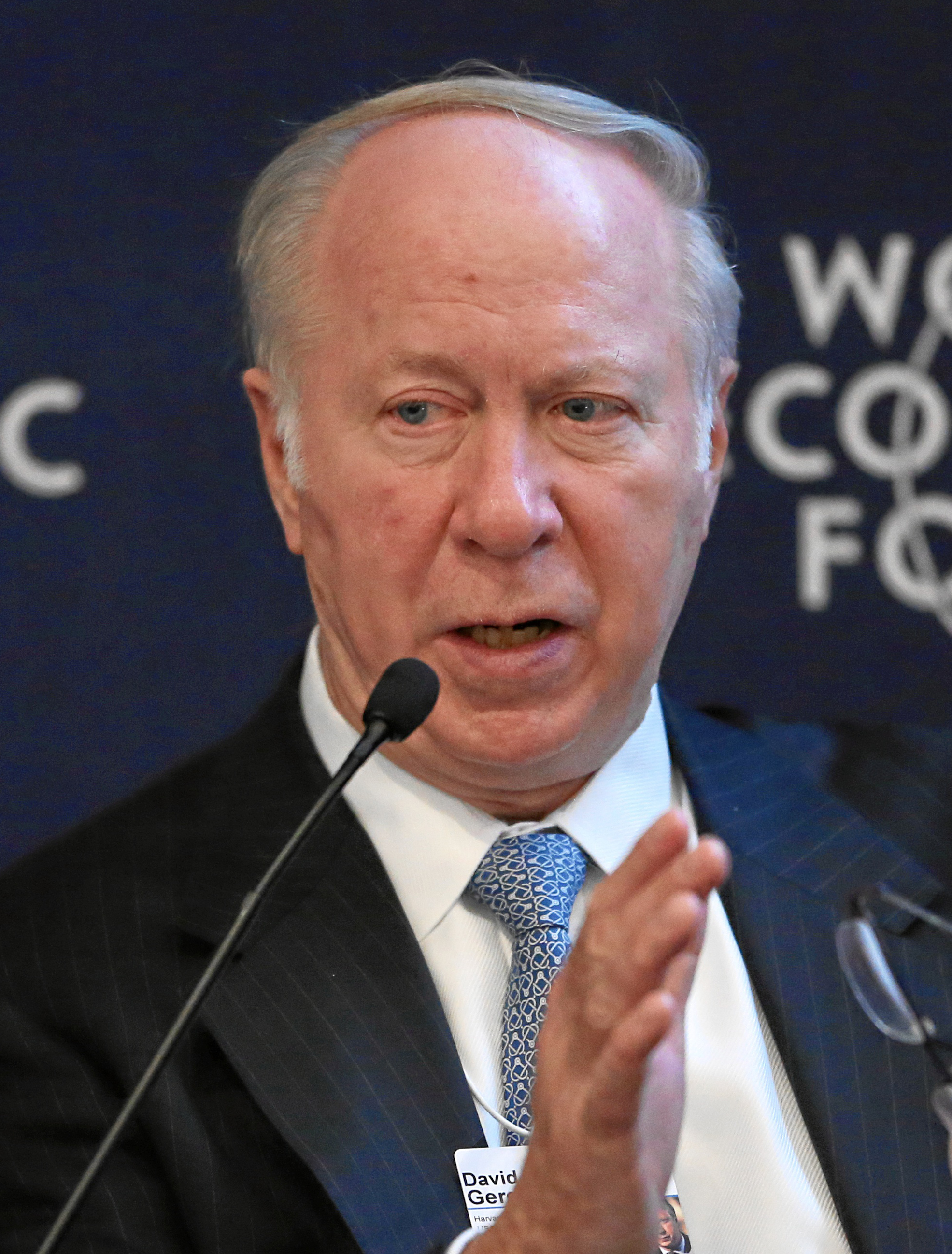
David Gergen, advisor to four presidents and U.S. News & World Report editor-at-large

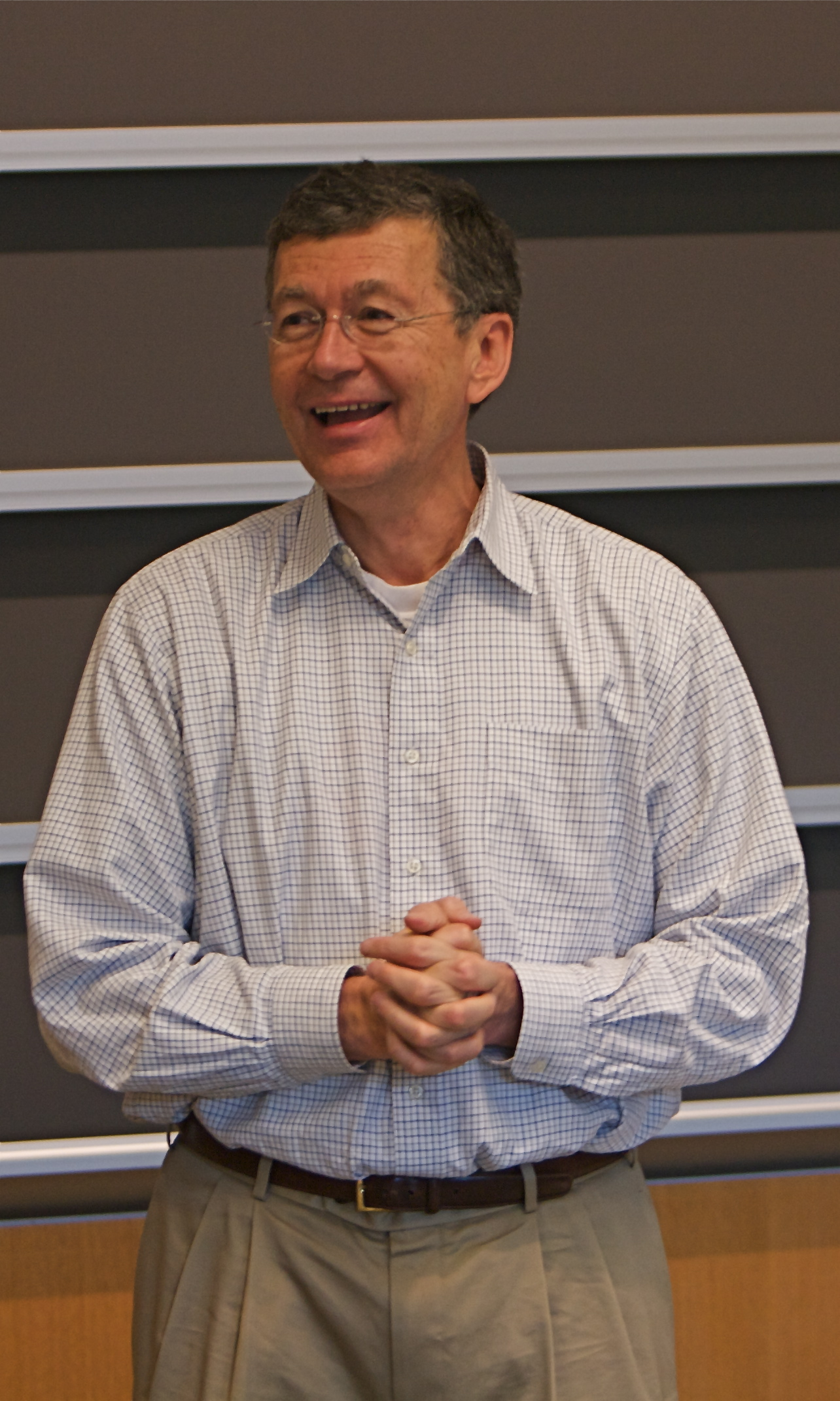
Reed Hundt, former FCC chairman

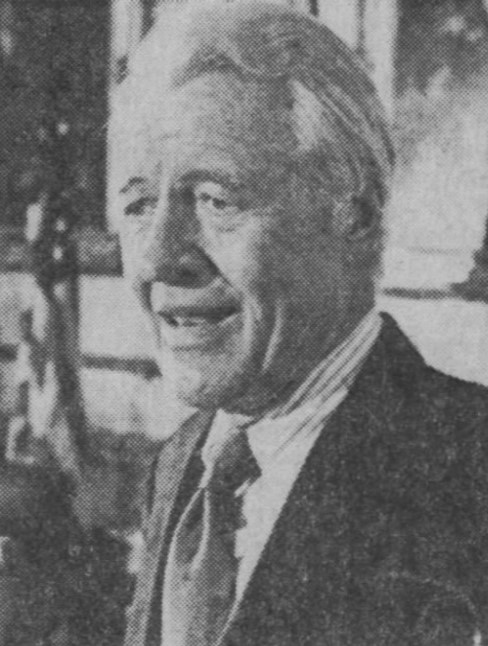
Robert D. Orr, former governor of Indiana

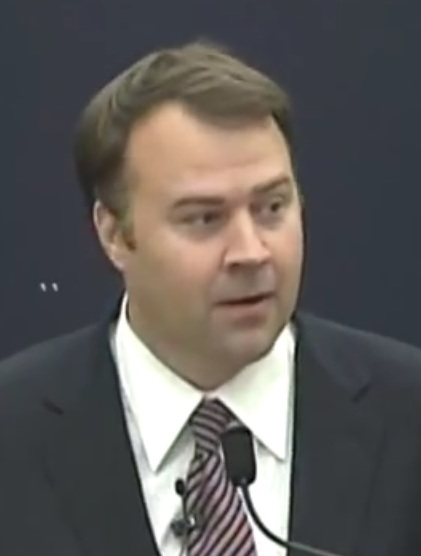
David A. Pepper, Ohio politician

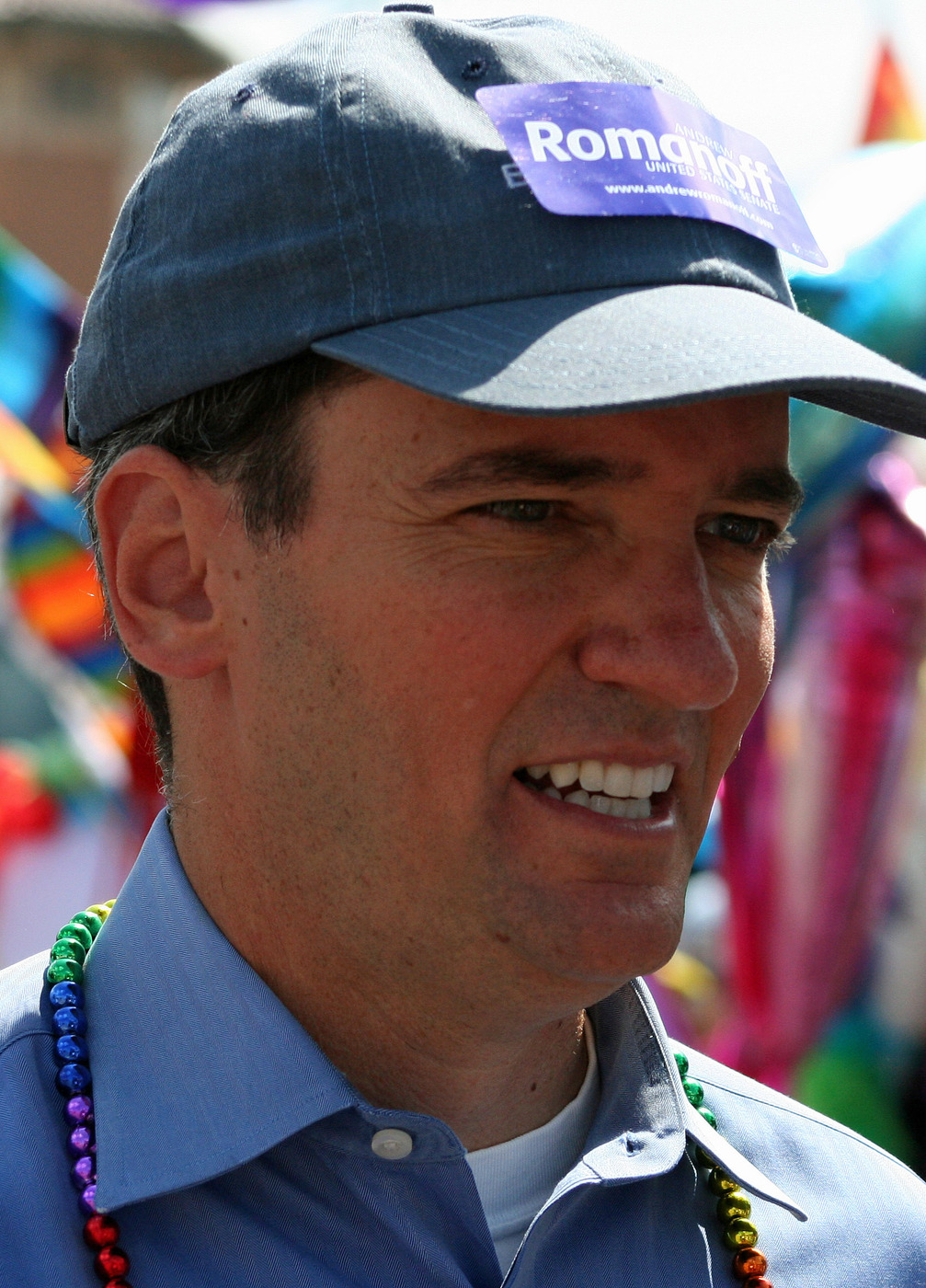
Andrew Romanoff, former Colorado Speaker of the House, candidate for Democratic nomination to US Senate

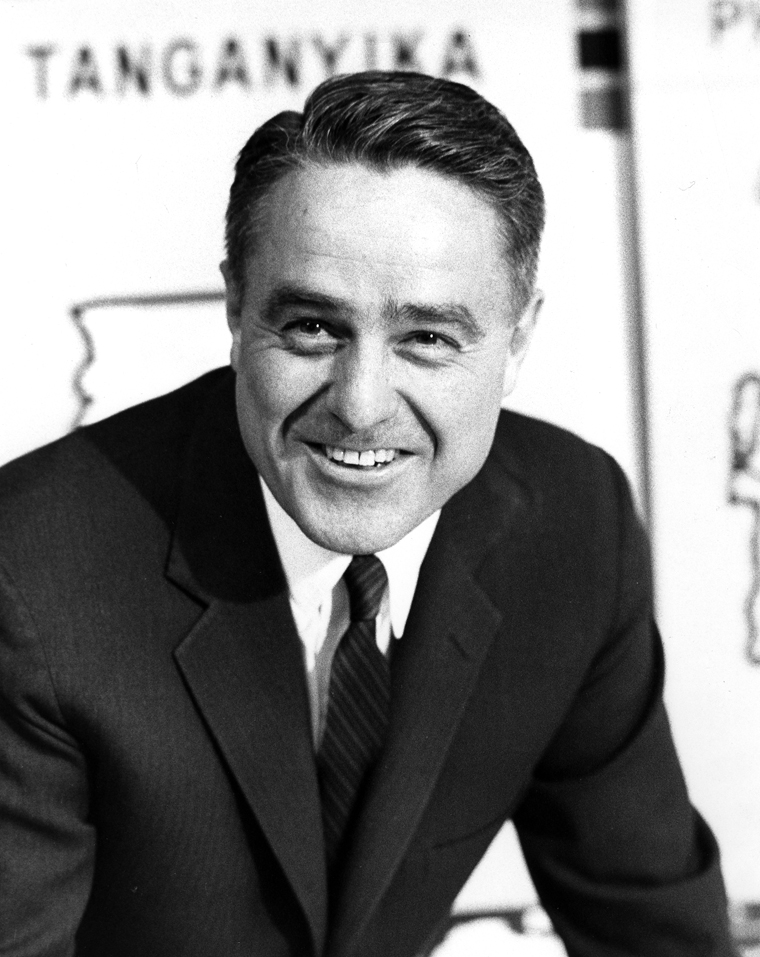
Sargent Shriver, first Peace Corps director

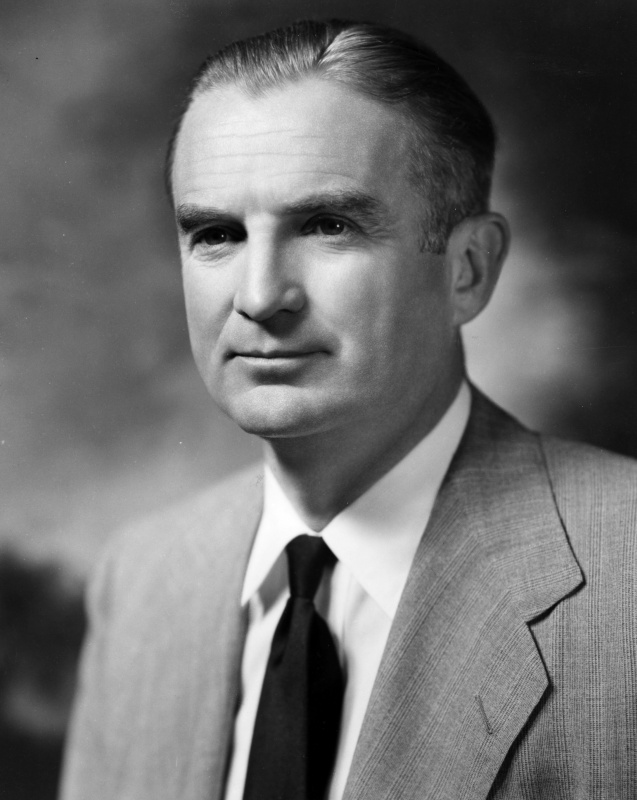
Stuart Symington, former US senator from Missouri

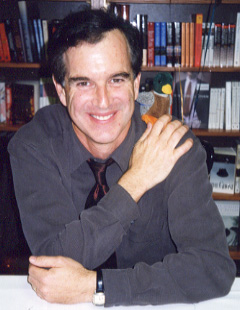
Garry Trudeau, cartoonist and creator of Doonesbury, which first appeared in the News' pages as Bull Tales

=== Journalism ===
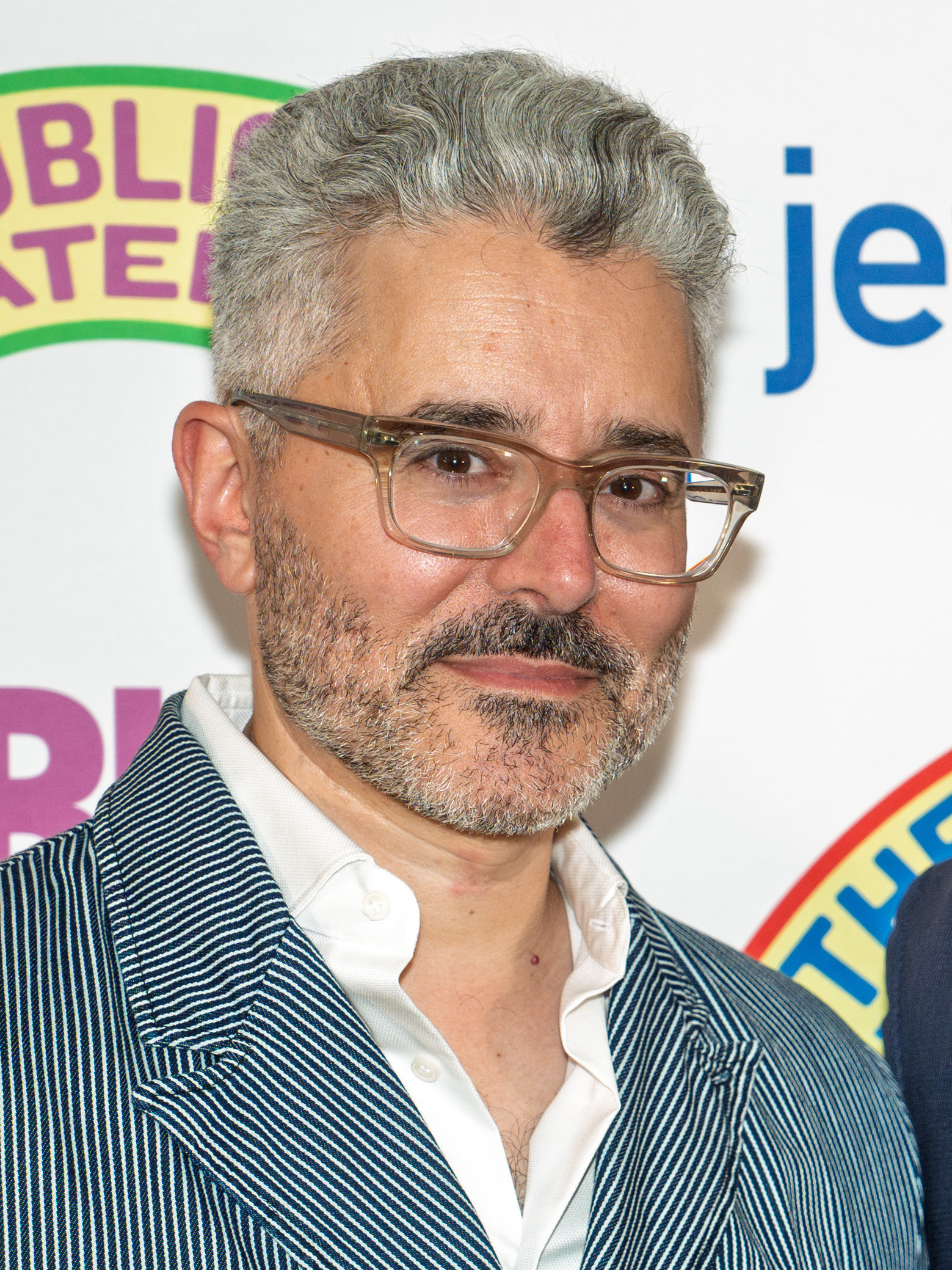
Michael Barbaro is the co-host of The New York Times news podcast The Daily, one of the most popular podcasts in the United States.

- Pete Axthelm, sportswriter
- Michael Barbaro, host of The Daily by The New York Times
- Ellen Barry, Pulitzer Prize–winning Moscow correspondent, The New York Times
- Alex Berenson, novelist and former business reporter for The New York Times
- Christopher Buckley, novelist and writer
- William F. Buckley Jr., founder of National Review
- Meghan Clyne is a Washington, D.C.–based writer, recently for The Weekly Standard
- Henry S.F. Cooper, a New Yorker journalist and author
- Michael Crowley, senior editor, New Republic
- Charles Duhigg, business reporter for The New York Times
- Charles Forelle, European correspondent for The Wall Street Journal
- Dan Froomkin, Washington Editor of TheIntercept.com
- Zack O'Malley Greenburg, Forbes staff writer and author of Jay-Z biography Empire State of Mind
- Lloyd Grove, freelance writer, former gossip columnist for the New York Daily News and The Washington Post
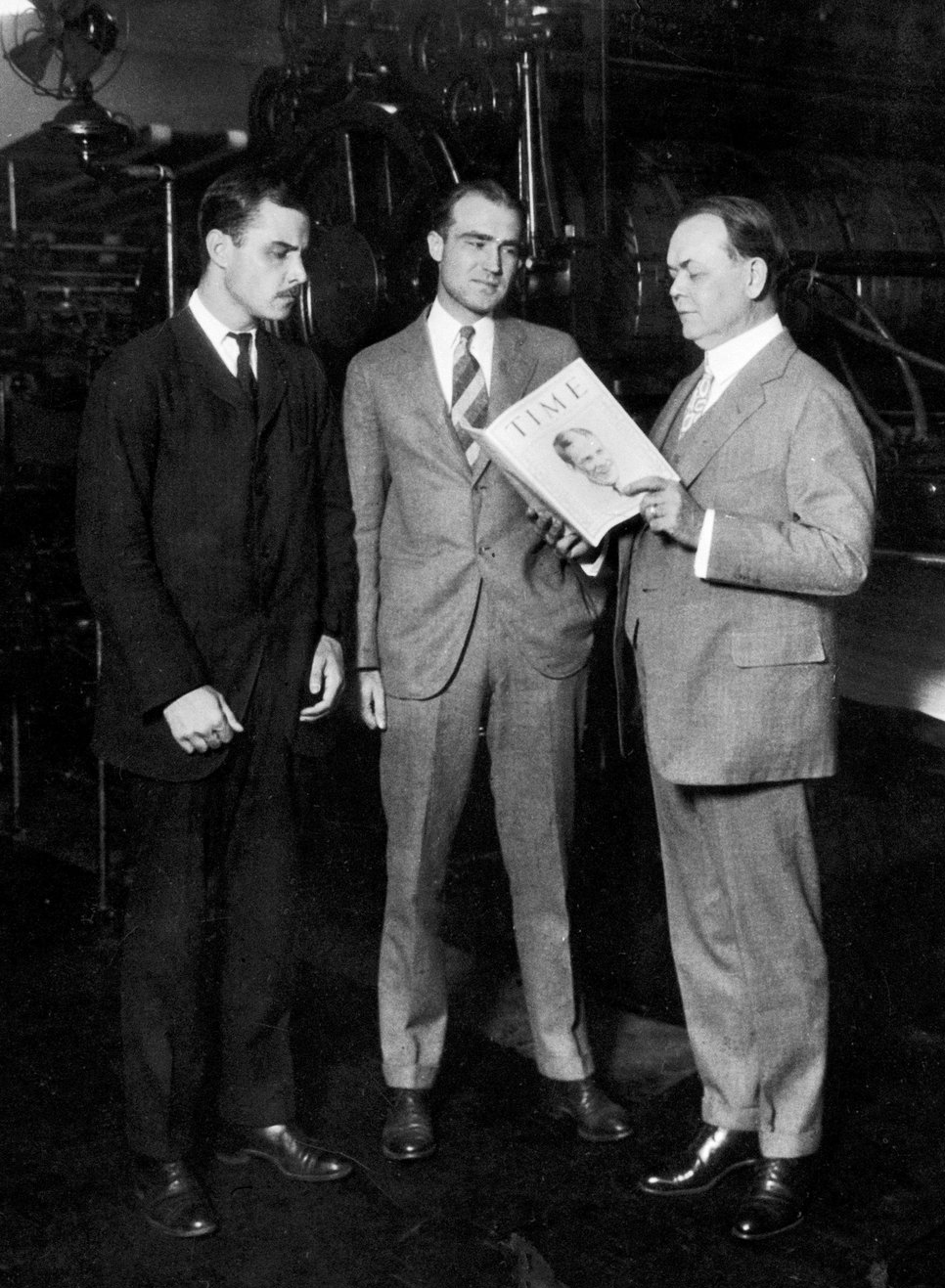
- Yale Daily News alumni Briton Hadden (left) and Henry Luce (center) co-founded Time. It was the first weekly news magazine in the United States.
  Briton Hadden, co-founder of Time
- R. Thomas Herman, reporter and tax columnist for The Wall Street Journal
- John Hersey, Pulitzer Prize–winning journalist and author
- Robert G. Kaiser, associate editor of The Washington Post
- Matthew Kaminski, Editor-in-Chief of Politico, former editor at The Wall Street Journal
- David Leonhardt, Pulitzer Prize–winning economics columnist, The New York Times
- Joanne Lipman, founding Editor-in-Chief of Conde Nast Portfolio magazine and former Deputy Managing Editor of The Wall Street Journal.
- Adam Liptak, supreme court correspondent for The New York Times
- Henry Luce, co-founder of Time
- Dana Milbank, columnist and former White House correspondent for The Washington Post
- Martine Powers, senior audio producer and host of Post Reports by The Washington Post
- Philip Rucker, White House bureau chief for The Washington Post
- Robert Semple, Pulitzer Prize winner and former member of The New York Times editorial board
- Paul Steiger, Emeritus Editor-in-Chief of "ProPublica," former managing editor of The Wall Street Journal
- Jack Schlossberg, American writer
- John Tierney, columnist for The New York Times
- Calvin Trillin, columnist and humorist
- Jacob Weisberg, editor of Slate
- Vivian Yee, Cairo bureau chief for The New York Times

=== Other ===
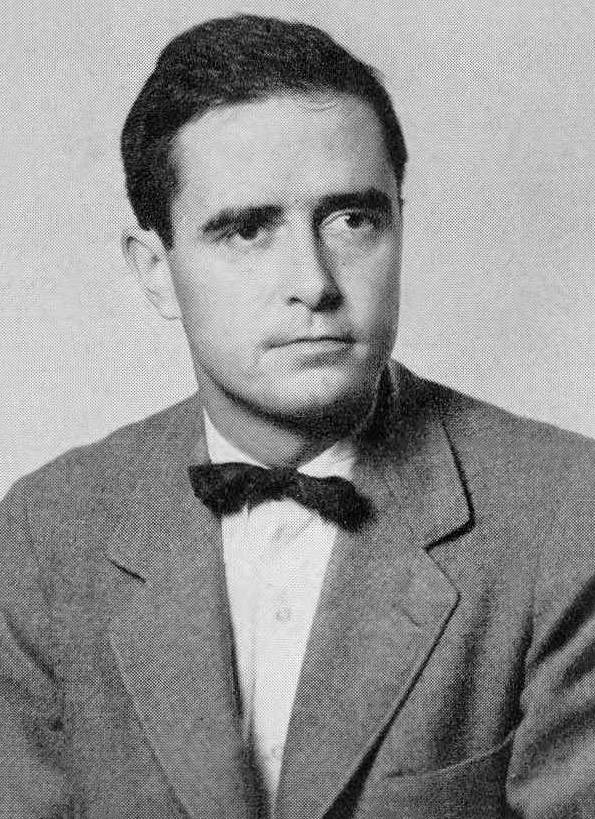
- Kingman Brewster served as the 17th president of Yale University and as U.S. ambassador to the United Kingdom under Jimmy Carter.
  Kingman Brewster, former president of Yale University and U.S. ambassador to the United Kingdom
- Lan Samantha Chang, director of Iowa Writers' Workshop
- Theo Epstein, Chicago Cubs general manager
- Thayer Hobson, chairman of William Morrow and Company
- Eli Jacobs, Wall Street investor.
- Ted Landsmark, educator and attorney
- Paul Mellon, philanthropist
- John E. Pepper Jr., former chairman of the Walt Disney Company
- Gaddis Smith, professor emeritus of history at Yale
- Lyman Spitzer, theoretical physicist
- Daniel Yergin, Pulitzer Prize-winning author and economic researcher

== In popular culture ==
I was rather literary in college—one year I wrote a series of very solemn and obvious editorials for the Yale News—and now I was going to bring back all such things into my life and become again that most limited of all specialists, the “well-rounded man.”

— Nick Carraway, in F. Scott Fitzgerald, The Great Gatsby, Chapter I

- In The Great Gatsby, narrator and protagonist Nick Carraway says that he wrote a series of editorials for the paper while in college.
- The characters Rory Gilmore and Paris Geller have both served as editors of the Yale Daily News on the CW TV show Gilmore Girls.
