= Hottrix =

Software development company

Hottrix, LLC
- Type: Domestic limited liability company
- Industry: Computer software
- Founded: Las Vegas, Nevada (July 18, 2008)
- Founder: Steven L. Priedel; Maria H. Gara
- Fate: Acquired
- Headquarters: Las Vegas, Nevada
- Area served: Worldwide
- Website: www.hottrix.com

Hottrix is an American software development company that produces applications for mobile operating systems such as iOS (iPhone, iPod Touch, iPad), Android, Palm OS, and Windows. Their iPhone and iPod Touch software has been praised by CNN, Newsweek, Time, and David Pogue for The New York Times. Their software has also been involved in intellectual property disputes.

The company also sells physical "gimmix" to complement their magic applications.

== Background ==
Hottrix is based in Las Vegas, Nevada. Many of their "tricks" are invented by Steve Sheraton, whose first trick was "e-spresso", a virtual cup of espresso for the Palm Pilot.

Notable Hottrix personnel include:

- Steven L. Priedel, managing member, magician
- Maria H. Gara, managing member, magician
- Steve Sheraton, contractor, Swiss-born producer and inventor, previously a certified magician and physical comedian
- Steve Charney, video host, radio personality, author, magician

== Recognition ==
In December 2008, Apple Inc. released a series of lists that showed the top downloads of the year from the App Store. The lists showed the 10 most-downloaded applications from different categories, in no particular order. The iBeer application from Hottrix appeared in both the "Top Paid Apps (Overall)" and "Top Paid Entertainment" lists.

iBeer was also called a "must-have" application by CNN Money. Hottrix was praised by Condé Nast Portfolio for their trick software, with iBeer singled out as "the perfect gift".

== Intellectual property ==
In October 2008, Hottrix filed a US$12.5 million lawsuit against Coors Brewing Company for developing an application called iPint for iOS. The suit alleged that Coors violated copyright law by making a program similar to iBeer. Apple removed iPint from the App Store in the United States after receiving a complaint from Hottrix.

== List of iOS applications ==
=== App Store apps ===
These tricks are available at the App Store.

==== HottrixPhone ====
This trick gives the appearance of a phone call with a celebrity, including real pre-recorded voices of same. Multiple celebrities are available in the application, including Elvis Presley and Barack Obama, and the ability for users to add others.

==== iBeer ====

iBeer is a trick that gives the illusion that the device screen "fills" with many varieties of beer (including sound). If the device is tilted, the virtual beer swishes around to give the illusion of truly being filled with beer. The beer can be "drained" if the device is tilted enough, and a belch sounds when the beer has been completely drained. iBeer appeared in both the "Top Paid Apps (Overall)" and "Top Paid Entertainment" lists published by Apple in December 2008.

==== iBug ====
iBug is a trick that gives the appearance of a virtual insect appearing on the screen of the device. It responds to touch and can get fat. The bug laughs when the device is shaken.

==== iMilk ====
iMilk is a trick similar to iBeer, but appears as different varieties of milk, such as chocolate milk, strawberry milk, and "martian milk." iMilk has a pay trick and a magic button to perform various tricks with money.

==== iMunchies ====
iMunchies is a trick that gives the illusion that the device is filling with many varieties of snacks such as candy, nuts, and popcorn. A person could then pretend to pull snacks out of the device by reaching beneath it and retrieving a previously-hidden snack using sleight of hand. The snacks can also be poured out of the device.

==== iSoda ====
iSoda is a trick similar to iBeer and iMilk, but with various soft drinks, such as cola, energy drink, and fizzy water.

==== Jarheads ====
Jarhead Bob, Jarhead Tim, and Jarhead Ned are tricks that have dungeon lab samples in potent juice. The heads roll their eyes when the device is tilted and the juice turns into blood when shaken. The liquid drains when the device is tilted enough, similar to iBeer.

==== Magic Wallet ====
Magic Wallet is a trick similar to iMunchies, but with coins in many currencies instead of snacks.

=== Premier apps ===
These tricks are like App Store apps, but are only available at Hottrix's Premier App Shop.

- iHypno, a card trick application, mentioned in The Wall Street Journal as an example of a legal workaround to the Apple iTunes Store.
- MindBeam
  - MB: Euro
- Snapshot

=== Simulated apps ===
These tricks play as a video on iOS's video player.

- iBugClassic
- iCharger
- iFireplace
- iGoldfish
- iGoyfish
- iRescueCall
- iSnail
- iVegas
- iYuleLog
- MMS-3D

== List of Android OS applications ==
- iBeer
- iMilk
- iChocolate

== List of Palm OS applications ==
- AbraMath
- AbraPick
- e-spresso
- NerdAlert

== See also ==
- Micromagic
