= Dan Greenburg =

American writer (1936–2023)

- Born: June 20, 1936; Chicago, Illinois, U.S.
- Died: December 18, 2023 (aged 87); The Bronx, New York, U.S.
- Education: University of Illinois (BA); University of California, Los Angeles (MA)
- Occupation: Writer
- Spouses: Nora Ephron (m. 1967; div. 1976) Suzanne O'Malley (m. 1980; div. 1998) Judith C. Wilson (after 1998)

Daniel Greenburg (June 20, 1936 – December 18, 2023) was an American writer, humorist, and journalist. His 73 books have been published in 20 languages in 24 countries.

His books for adults include the non-fiction books How to Be a Jewish Mother: A Very Lovely Training Manual (1964), How to Make Yourself Miserable: Another Vital Training Manual (1966, with Marcia Jacobs), and How to Avoid Love and Marriage (1983, with Suzanne O'Malley) – all satirical self-help books – as well as the novels Love Kills (1978), Exes (1990), and Fear Itself (2014).

Greenburg wrote four series of children's books, The Zack Files, Secrets of Dripping Fang, Maximum Boy, and Weird Planet.

== Writing career ==
Daniel Greenburg was born on June 20, 1936, in Chicago, Illinois, the son of Samuel (an artist) and Leah Greenburg.

Greenburg studied design at the University of Illinois. While there, he read Catcher in the Rye, which inspired him to become a writer. He received his B.A. degree from the University of Illinois and his M.A. degree from the University of California in Los Angeles.

His first piece of professional writing was "3 Bears in Search of an Author", a retelling of the same story in the voices of J.D. Salinger, Ernest Hemingway, and James Joyce. The piece was published in Esquire magazine, and Esquire commissioned a sequel: "Hansel and Gretel" in the styles of Vladimir Nabokov, Jack Kerouac and Samuel Beckett.

After obtaining his M.A. in industrial design, he continued to live in Los Angeles. Dissatisfied with industrial design, he spent three years working at advertising agencies. Meanwhile, his old editor at Esquire, Ralph Ginzburg, had started a new national magazine called Eros and convinced Greenburg to move to New York and become its managing editor. In New York, Greenburg began to write a satirical non-fiction book entitled How to Be a Jewish Mother, which became the bestselling non-fiction book of 1965.

In September 1969, he published Porno-Graphics: The Shame of our Art Museums, a now scarce and far-out-of-print heavily illustrated book with lift-up vinyl page covers, pull-outs, and copies of famous paintings. In a retrospective interview, Greenburg said, "At the time, I was amused by all the people who were being offended by anything slightly sexual. Usually when something sexual is covered up, it becomes more sexual. I thought it was funny. I had already had some success with a couple of books and Random House said to me 'what else can you do?'"

Greenburg is probably most well known for authoring a handful of very popular series of children's books, although he still also wrote novels for adults (mostly mysteries and thrillers). He also wrote for television and movies, and has been regularly published in Life, Time, The New Yorker, and other national publications.

When asked how he keeps in touch with what kids like in an interview in 2005, he responded: "I visit schools constantly. I talk to kids, I try out ideas on them, and I ask them what they like to read. Both boys and girls tell me they love scary stories and funny stories the best, and the boys tell me they love to be grossed out. I've tried to do all three things in these books." When asked where he gets ideas for his books, he replied: "1) inspiration from adventures I've survived; 2) a funny title I think up first ...; 3) asking myself "What if ...?".

== Personal life and death ==
Greenburg's first wife was film director and author Nora Ephron (1941–2012). After seven years, their marriage ended in an amicable divorce.

His second wife was writer Suzanne O'Malley, whom he married in 1980; they remained married for fifteen years before they separated, eventually divorcing in 1998. With O'Malley, he had a son, Zack O'Malley Greenburg; Dan Greenburg's children's book series The Zack Files was named for him.

Greenburg's third wife was Judith C. Wilson, a children's book author. They resided in Hastings-on-Hudson, [New York].

Greenburg died of complications from a stroke at a hospice in the Bronx, on December 18, 2023, at the age of 87.

== Selected works ==
=== Books for adults ===
- How to Be a Jewish Mother: A Very Lovely Training Manual (1964)
- Kiss My Firm But Pliant Lips (1965)
- How to Make Yourself Miserable: Another Vital Training Manual (1966)
- Chewsday (1968)
- Philly (1969)
- Porno-Graphics: The Shame of Our Art Museums (1969)
- Scoring (1972)
- Something's There: My Adventures in the Occult (1976)
- Love Kills (1978)
- What Do Women Want? (1982)
- How to Avoid Love and Marriage (1983)
- True Adventures (1985)
- Confessions of a Pregnant Father (1986)
- The Nanny (1987)
- Exes (1990)
- Moses Supposes: The Bible As Told to Dan Greenburg (1997)
- Claws (2006)

=== Books for children ===
The Zack Files chapter books
- Great Grandpa's in the Litter Box (#1)
- Through the Medicine Cabinet (#2)
- A Ghost Named Wanda (#3)
- ZAP! I'm a Mind Reader (#4)
- Dr. Jekyll, Orthodontist (#5)
- I'm Out of My Body ... Please Leave a Message (#6)
- Never Trust a Cat Who Wears Earrings (#7)
- My Son, the Time Traveler (#8)
- The Volcano Goddess Will See You Now (#9)
- Bozo the Clone (#10)
- How to Speak Dolphin in Three Easy Lessons (#11)
- Now You See Me ... Now You Don't (#12)
- The Misfortune Cookie (#13)
- Elvis the Turnip ... and Me (#14)
- Hang a Left at Venus (#15)
- Evil Queen Tut and the Great Ant Pyramids (#16)
- Yikes! Grandma's a Teenager (#17)
- How I Fixed the Year 1000 Problem (#18)
- The Boy Who Cried Bigfoot (#19)
- How I Went from Bad to Verse (#20)
- Don't Count on Dracula (#21)
- This Body's Not Big Enough for Both of Us (#22)
- Greenish Eggs and Dinosaurs (#23)
- My Grandma, Major League Slugger (#24)
- Trapped in the Museum of Unnatural History (#25)
- Me and My Mummy (#26)
- My Teacher Ate My Homework (#27)
- Tell a Lie and Your Butt Will Grow (#28)
- Just Add Water ... and Scream! (#29)
- It's Itchcraft! (#30)

Secrets of Dripping Fang chapter books

- The Onts (#1)
- Treachery and Betrayal at Jolly Days (#2)
- The Vampire's Curse (#3)
- Fall of the House of Mandible (#4)
- The Shluffmuffin Boy is History (#5)
- Attack of the Giant Octopus (#6)
- Please Don't Eat the Children (#7)
- When Bad Snakes Attack Good Children (#8)

Maximum Boy chapter books

- How I Became a Superhero (#1)
- The Day Everything Tasted Like Broccoli (#2)
- Superhero ... or Super Thief? (#3)
- Invasion from the Planet of the Cows (#4)
- Maximum Girl Unmasked (#5)
- Attack of the Soggy Underwater People (#6)
- Meet Super Sid, Crime-Fighting Kid (#7)
- The Worst Bully in the Entire Universe (#8)

Weird Planet chapter books

- Dude, Where's My Space Ship? (#1)
- Lost in Las Vegas (#2)
- Chilling with the Great Ones (#3)
- Attack of the Evil Elvises (#4)
- Lights ... Camera ... Liftoff! (#5)
- Thrills, Chills, and Cosmic Spills (#6)

- Jumbo the Boy and Arnold the Elephant, illustrated by Susan Perl (Bobbs-Merrill, 1969), picture book
- The Bed Who Ran Away from Home, illus. John Wallner (HarperCollins, 1991), picture book
- Young Santa, illus. Warren Miller (Viking Press, 1991), chapter book
- Claws (Random House, 2006), chapter book

=== Filmography ===
- Live a Little, Love a Little (1968), based on his novel Kiss My Firm But Pliant Lips
- I Could Never Have Sex with Any Man Who Has So Little Regard for My Husband (1973), based on his novel Chewsday
- Fore Play (1975), with Bruce Jay Friedman and David Odell
- Private Lessons (1981), based on his novel Philly
- Private School (1983)
- The Guardian (1990), based on his novel The Nanny
- Private Lessons II (1993), based on his novel Philly

=== Dramatic works ===
Greenburg's plays have been performed on Broadway, off-Broadway, at the American Conservatory Theater, Yale University, and at the Actors Studio, where he was a member of the Playwrights Unit.

- Free to Be... You and Me (contributor)
- Oh! Calcutta! (1969, 1976)
- Arf! and The Great Airplane Snatch (author of one-acts that ran off-Broadway)
- The Restaurant (author of one-act play which ran off-Broadway)
- Convention (author of one-act play which ran off-Broadway)
- How to Be a Jewish Mother (December 1967) (co-author, author of the original book). Stage adaptations of Greenburg's best-selling book have been running for over 30 years; they've been produced in France, Spain, Poland, Israel, Brazil, Holland, Turkey, and Brazil.

=== Television ===
- A Deadly Vision (a 1997 made-for-TV movie adaptation by Greenburg of his best-selling novel, Love Kills)
- The Zack Files (a 2000–2002 television series based on Greenburg's best-selling children's book series)
- Mad About You (story credit on the Paul Reiser television series)
- Steambath (one episode)

Greenburg has also written numerous sitcom pilots for CBS-TV and NBC-TV, including a fireman sitcom for producer-comedian Alan King, which Greenburg researched by spending months with NYC firefighters, and a cop sitcom for producer Sonny Grosso, which Greenburg researched by spending months with NYC homicide cops.

Greenburg was also a television talk show guest on the Today Show, The Tonight Show, Larry King Live, and Late Night with David Letterman. With fellow author Avery Corman, Greenburg has also appeared as a stand-up comedian on television talk shows hosted by Sir David Frost, Dick Cavett, and Merv Griffin, and has performed at the New York Improv comedy club.

== Journalism ==
More than 150 of Greenburg's articles and humor pieces have appeared in such periodicals as The New Yorker, Playboy, The Huffington Post, Vanity Fair, New York, Esquire, The New York Times Magazine, The New York Times Book Review, Time, Life, Newsweek, Ms., Cosmopolitan, Mademoiselle, and Reader's Digest, and have been reprinted in dozens of anthologies of humor and satire in the U.S. and the United Kingdom.

== Acting ==
Greenburg had small acting roles in several films he wrote, including Private Lessons, Private School, and I Could Never.... He also played John Clum in Doc (1971), the Frank Perry remake of Gunfight at the O.K. Corral.
