= Ask Me Again =

Film episode

"Ask Me Again" was a 90-minute episode of the PBS series American Playhouse that aired on February 8, 1989. Adapted from Laurie Colwin's short story An Old-Fashioned Story, the comedy starred Leslie Hope as Elizabeth Leopold, a young literary editor with a complicated relationship with her wealthy, snobbish mother, Elinor (Cynthia Harris).

== Plot ==
As a child, Elizabeth Leopold finds Nelson Rodker, the son of family friends, hopelessly nerdy and annoyingly obsequious to adults. Elizabeth and her best friend, Holly, despise Nelson for the very virtues that make their upper-class parents admire him while despairing of his older brother, James, expelled from his fourth school and perpetually in trouble. When a teenage Nelson plays the word "vugh" for 26 points in a game of Scrabble the girls deride his knowing such a word and indignantly excuse themselves. They gossip over the news that the dashing James has been arrested and delight in adolescent fantasies about him. While waiting for Nelson to tutor her in trigonometry, Elizabeth encounters a nearly naked James, who drops his towel to discomfort her and pretentiously recites poetry to the impressionable Elizabeth.

Beginning their careers, the reluctant Elizabeth and Nelson resist the Leopolds' and the Rodkers' matchmaking. In a lower-class apartment, Elizabeth secretly dates her neighbor, the rebellious, counterculture journalist Roy Howard. Unable to directly confront her domineering mother, Elizabeth perpetually makes excuses to avoid her manipulations and fashion dictates. On finding a new scarf in her handbag, Elizabeth remarks to Roy that her mom "is like a pickpocket in reverse--she slips expensive things into my bag".

The pressure to date increases when Nelson returns from a stint in the Peace Corps to begin practicing law. The noncommitted Roy, only leaving a note, takes off on his motorcycle for a month’s assignment on skinhead subculture.

One awkward date with Nelson doesn’t appease the parents. Elizabeth tells Nelson that her ideal is someone “dangerous”; Nelson wants someone “happy.” When Elizabeth suggests pretending to date then staging a breakup to prove that they don't work out, Nelson reluctantly acquiesces. As they implement “the ruse”, Nelson chooses events that she would enjoy, such as a play in French by Molière, that would never have occurred to Roy. Elizabeth begins to appreciate Nelson as a friend. Roy returns unexpectedly from his assignment during a dinner party with the Leopolds, and the dating ruse is exposed.

Elizabeth is promoted to associate editor for French literature at a Manhattan publishing house, but the self-absorbed Roy is oblivious to her career. She runs into Nelson on the street and tells him about her promotion. Nelson responds, "Assistant to Associate? That's a quantum leap!" Roy takes off for a venture in Central America for two or three years; they break up when Elizabeth declines to marry him and go along.

Nelson comforts Elizabeth, who is on a drunken binge over the breakup. Holly now decides she is interested in Nelson: Elizabeth protests, "Nelson is my problem!" Holly responds, "I don't consider him a problem, I consider him a prospect!" Her mother maliciously tells Elizabeth that Nelson is now better off with Holly and untruthfully says Nelson claims he only went along with the ruse at Elizabeth’s cajoling. Outraged, Elizabeth tells off Nelson for “blaming” her.

Confused by conflicting emotions, Elizabeth defiantly wears a provocative red dress to the Rodker’s Christmas party, attracting the disreputable James. James sweeps her away to an intimate bar, disillusioning her by getting drunk, whining, and rambling on about his stagnant poetic aspirations, hostility to society, and resentment of his parents and his “whimpy” brother, of whom he is jealous. Realizing that James has asked her out to annoy his brother, Elizabeth wishes to leave. Back at the party, James implies to guests in a loud voice that their absence was sexual, and rumors spread over the next week.

Upon hearing the gossip at a New Years Eve party, Nelson defends Elizabeth, punching out James. Alone at home nursing a cold, Elizabeth receives a visit from Nelson, who assures her that he and Holly dated once but didn’t enjoy themselves. He confesses that he came to tell her that he loves her and wants to know if she can love him. Elizabeth realizes that by shrewdly playing along to gain the adults’ trust, Nelson had achieved independence while she and James had been stuck in counterproductive defiance, not truly disengaging. As the New Year arrives, they kiss, though she warns he may catch her cold. He replies that he lives dangerously.

== Cast ==
Leslie Hope – Elizabeth Leopold
Robert Bruce – Nelson Rodker
Cynthia Harris – Elinor Leopold
Alice Haining – Holly
D.W. Moffet – James Rodker
Jeffrey Nordling – Roy Howard
William Bogert – Roger Leopold
Kathryn Hays – Harriet Rodker
David O’Brien – Marshall Rodker
Robert Oliveri – Young Nelson

== Song ==
The title song, George Gershwin and Ira Gershwin's "Ask Me Again", was recorded by Rosemary Clooney and Michael Feinstein on the 1986 album Mostly Mercer and included in David Merrick's 1990 production of "Oh, Kay". The lyrics include:

Ask me again/Who's the one I've begun to adore
Ask me again/Who's the partner my heart pounded for

According to Gershwin biographer Howard Pollack, Ira Gershwin thought the song was the finest of his unpublished songs.

== Reception ==
Walter Goodman of The New York Times commended the "sleekly sleazy" portrayal of Nelson's naughty brother, James (D. W. Moffett), while calling Elizabeth's parents' characters "grossly caricatured". Don Shirley of the Los Angeles Times found Elizabeth's change of heart to be unrealistic, claiming she would throw Nelson back into the dating pool in real life.
