= I Could Never Have Sex with Any Man Who Has So Little Regard for My Husband =

1973 film directed by Robert McCarty

- Directed by: Robert McCarty
- Written by: Dan Greenburg
- Based on: Chewsday by Dan Greenburg
- Produced by: Gail Stayden; Martin Stayden
- Starring: Carmine Caridi; Andrew Duncan; Cynthia Harris; Lynne Lipton
- Cinematography: Jeri Sopanen
- Edited by: John Carter
- Music by: Joseph Liebman
- Production company: Cinema 5
- Distributed by: Cinema 5 Distributing
- Release date: July 20, 1973
- Running time: 86 minutes
- Country: United States
- Language: English

I Could Never Have Sex with Any Man Who Has So Little Regard for My Husband is a 1973 American sex comedy film directed by Robert McCarty, from a screenplay by Dan Greenburg, based on his 1968 novel Chewsday. The film stars Carmine Caridi, Andrew Duncan, Cynthia Harris, and Lynne Lipton.

== Synopsis ==
Two middle-aged pairs of aspiring swingers rent a summer cottage in Martha's Vineyard, Massachusetts. They sit around discussing the pros and cons of having affairs.

== Cast ==
- Carmine Caridi as Marvin
- Andrew Duncan as Stanley
- Cynthia Harris as Laura
- Lynne Lipton as Mandy
- Dan Greenburg as Herb
- Gail Stayden as Barbara DeVroom
- Martin Stayden as Tony DeVroom
