= 3 Kings (book) =

2018 non-fiction book by Zack O'Malley Greenburg

3 Kings: Diddy, Dr. Dre, Jay-Z and Hip-Hop's Multibillion-Dollar Rise
- First edition
- Author: Zack O'Malley Greenburg
- Cover artist: Fab 5 Freddy
- Language: English
- Genre: Biography, non-fiction
- Publisher: Little, Brown
- Publication date: March 6, 2018
- Publication place: United States
- Media type: Print (hardcover), E-Book
- ISBN: 978-1478911784
- OCLC: 1444402490

3 Kings: Diddy, Dr. Dre, Jay-Z and Hip-Hop's Multibillion-Dollar Rise is a non-fiction book by Zack O'Malley Greenburg published by Little, Brown in March 2018.

== Synopsis ==
The book examines the careers of Diddy, Dr. Dre, and Jay-Z through reports and interviews from people such as Swizz Beatz, Kendrick Lamar, Shaquille O'Neal, Russell Simmons, Kevin Liles, Troy Carter, Grandwizzard Theodore and Lovebug Starski. There is consideration of the nature of characteristics that made the figures most successful, the general economic nature of hip-hop and a potential "4th King", 50 Cent.

== Reception ==
3 Kings has been reviewed in multiple outlets such as the Wall Street Journal and USA Today. Exclaim! reviewed the book, writing "Greenburg's ability to weave the facts and figures of his subjects into hip-hop's cultural lineage makes 3 Kings an engaging read for fans of the beats or business". Rolling Stone also reviewed 3 Kings, stating that "The number of hundred-million–dollar deals Greenburg chronicles is staggering. But he's also aware that hip-hop's mega-mogul phase is fading, as artists like Kanye West and A$AP Rocky reduce their pursuit of pure payments in a search for prestige ("a currency that's becoming perhaps more valuable than the dollar")." The Kirkus review considered the attempts to link the success factors of the three "a bit ham-fisted" but praised the book as "a pleasingly broad perspective of hip-hop as economic triumph" and "a wide-ranging survey of the first four decades of hip-hop that vividly brings some of the culture’s biggest success stories into one place."
