= Maximum Boy =

Book series by Dan Greenburg

- Author: Dan Greenburg
- Illustrator: Greg Swearingen
- Cover artist: Swearingen
- Country: United States
- Genre: Superhero, chapter book
- Publisher: Little Apple Paperbacks, Scholastic Corporation
- Published: 2001 to 2003
- Media type: Print (paperback original)
- No. of books: 8

Maximum Boy is a series of eight chapter books for young readers written by the humorist Dan Greenburg, illustrated by Greg Swearingen, and published by Scholastic from 2001 to 2003. Alternatively, Maximum Boy is the main character of the series, a boy superhero, and the full title of each volume begins "Maximum Boy, starring in". The first volume was The Hijacking of Manhattan (that is, full title Maximum Boy, starring in the Hijacking of Manhattan). It was also issued as simply Hijacked! and as How I Became a Superhero.

"Maximum Boy" is Max Silver, an 11-year-old boy who lives on the north side of Chicago beside Lake Michigan, with his mom, dad, and teenage sister Tiffany. He has braces, eyeglasses, and superpowers: he can lift freight trains, fly faster than a space shuttle, and burp the alphabet. He has an adult friend named Porter Torrington, who is "Tortoise Man" and has a superpower called the Tortoise Ray.

Max has a few weaknesses. Milk products and sweet potatoes give him a badly upset stomach. Ragweed makes him sneeze his head off. Seeing and hearing mathematics makes him weak and dizzy.

Dan Greenburg grew up in Chicago like Max and partly based the fictional character on his own childhood. For example, Greenburg hated math lessons and Max loses his super powers if he comes across a math problem.

The Maximum Boy books are the earliest works by illustrator Greg Swearingen with records linked to his name in the Library of Congress online catalog.

== Books ==
- The Hijacking of Manhattan (2001); alternative titles Hijacked! and How I Became a Superhero
- Invasion from the Planet of the Cows (2001)
- Superhero ... or Super Thief? (2001)
- The Day Everything Tasted Like Broccoli (2001)
- Maximum Girl Unmasked (2002)
- Attack of the Soggy Underwater People (2002)
- Meet Super Sid, Crime-Fighting Kid (2002)
- The Worst Bully in the Entire Universe (2003)

== Plot of volume 3, Superhero ... or Super Thief? ==
Max forgot to set his alarm and overslept. So he did his morning routine fast. He rushed into the shower, which made his sister angry. He gulped his breakfast. On his way to school, Max encountered many delays, which caused him to arrive at school just one minute before school started.

At school he found his classmates and everyone else frozen. His teacher, Mrs Mulvahill, was staring at him. He left his class and saw another frozen boy named Sheldon. He left school and saw everybody outside frozen, even his family. He met his adult friend, Tortoise Man. Tortoise Man and his wife were frozen while playing a game of Scrabble.

After sometime everyone thawed out and they talked about the world being frozen. A reporter named Warren Blatt came and accused Tortoise Man of using his Tortoise Ray to freeze the world. The president called to tell Max that a thief had stolen four of the world's greatest treasures—the Mona Lisa painting by Leonardo da Vinci in the Louvre museum in Paris; the Hope Diamond at New York's Museum of Natural History, on loan from the Smithsonian; the Crown Jewels from the Tower of London; and a billion dollars in gold bullion at Fort Knox in Kentucky.

Max went to his house to see how his family was. They weren't frozen anymore.

Max returned to his school, and his teacher told him that he missed out on the excitement—the whole world had been frozen. Max explained why he was late and had to go into detention.

After detention, Max saw the news on Newspapers and TV. One report said Tortoise Man's ray slowed things down.

The president called Max again, telling him to watch the videos from the burglarized locations. Max saw that the thief was dressed up like Maximum Boy, so his dad hired a lawyer for Max. But the lawyer his dad hired was a patent lawyer, not a defense attorney. Too bad because Max went to jail and a hero named Noodleman in his superhero team called him to say Max was expelled from the league of superheroes. Max was very unhappy to hear this news.

Max went for help to Tortoise Man, but Tortoise Man was depressed. Tortoise Man took Max to his old friend, Ethelred, and his servant, Wolfgang. Max finally discovered that Ethelred was the thief, but then Ethelred died.

The president and Noodleman came to apologize to Max for wrongly accusing him of stealing the four treasures.

== Characters ==
- Max "Maximum Boy" Silver - The main hero of the series, an 11-year-old superhero.
- Porter "Tortoise Man" Torrington - An adult friend of Maximum Boy, who has a power called the Tortoise Ray; in The Day Everything Tasted Like Broccoli he used it to save Max from an evil villain called the Tastemaker.
- Tastemaker - An evil villain.
- Ethelred - The thief who disguised himself as Maximum Boy; an old friend of Tortoise Man.
- Wolfgang - Ethelred's servant.
- Silvia/Tortoise Woman - Tortoise Man's wife.
- Warren Blatt - A reporter that accused Tortoise Man.
- The President
- Lester Boogerfinger - A patent lawyer. Mr Silver thinks he is a defense lawyer.
- Morton Smellybottom - A defense lawyer.
- Mrs Mulvahill - Max's teacher.
- Ben - One of Max's classmates.
- Jennifer - One of Max's classmates.
- Sherman - One of Max's classmates.
- Sheldon - A boy at Max's school.
- Silvia Trundle - A karate master and marine biologist.
- Dr Zirkon - An evil scientist. and tries to end maximum girl's life by stabbing her with a knife
- Mr Silver - Max's father.
- Mrs Silver - Max's mother.
- Tiffany "Maximum Girl" Silver - Max's teenage sister. Often irritates Max. Max refers to her as "his stupid sister". She gains powers after handling the same set of asteroids that gave Max his powers, however, she cannot use her powers as well as Max. maximum girl's archenemy's the calf
- Mr Torrington - Tortoise Man's father.
- Mrs Torrington - Tortoise Man's mother.

== Notes ==
The Washington Post reported in November 2001 that Maximum Boy, starring in The Hijacking of Manhattan had caused the publisher some concern because its cover showed Max flying past skyscrapers and it was published just before the September 11 attacks.

Invasion from the Planet of the Cows features Max meeting a cow named Bossy and making friends with her. The cows speak cow language, which is similar to the English language.
