= Michael Jackson, Inc. =

2014 book by Zack O'Malley Greenburg

Michael Jackson, Inc.: The Rise, Fall, and Rebirth of a Billion-Dollar Empire
- Book cover art for Michael Jackson, Inc.
- Author: Zack O'Malley Greenburg
- Cover artist: Borbay
- Language: English
- Genre: Biography, non-fiction
- Publisher: Atria Books
- Publication date: June 3, 2014
- Publication place: United States
- Media type: Print (hardcover), E-Book
- Pages: 304
- ISBN: 978-1476705965

Michael Jackson, Inc.: The Rise, Fall, and Rebirth of a Billion-Dollar Empire is a non-fiction book written by Zack O'Malley Greenburg, published in June 2014 by the Simon & Schuster imprint, Atria Books.

== Synopsis ==
From the official blurb: "Underlying Jackson’s unique history is the complex but universal tale of the effects of wealth and fame on the human psyche. A valuable case study for generations of entertainers to come and for anyone interested in show business, Michael Jackson, Inc. tells the story of a man whose financial feats, once obscured by his late-life travails, have become an enduring legacy."

Notable sources interviewed for the book included music industry veterans Berry Gordy, John Branca, Teddy Riley, Martin Bandier and Walter Yetnikoff; artists 50 Cent, Sheryl Crow, Pharrell Williams, Slash, Diddy and Jon Bon Jovi; and members of the Jackson family.

== Reception ==
The book was generally well-reviewed, with USA Today calling it "one of the hottest titles of the season" and the Chicago Tribune dubbing it "a fresh take on one of the most-discussed human beings of our era."

== Cover art ==
New York–based artist Borbay was commissioned to collaborate on the cover art for Michael Jackson, Inc. The artwork's original medium was acrylic and collage on canvas, and included clippings from the New York Post.
