= Zack O'Malley Greenburg =

American journalist (born 1985)

Zack O'Malley Greenburg (born March 8, 1985) is an American writer, journalist, and former child actor. He spent a decade as a senior editor at Forbes magazine, covering music, media and entertainment. He is also the author of five books, including Empire State of Mind: How Jay-Z Went From Street Corner to Corner Office (Penguin/Portfolio, 2011) and A-List Angels: How a Band of Actors, Artists, and Athletes Hacked Silicon Valley (Little, Brown, 2020). He played Lorenzo Odone in the 1992 film Lorenzo's Oil.

== Professional life ==
Greenburg's first writing job was reviewing video games at Boys' Life magazine at the age of 14. While at Yale, he wrote extensively for the Yale Daily News as a varsity baseball beat reporter, sports columnist, and scene (arts and living) writer. A feature he authored on a varsity outfielder who had returned to the field after nearly dying in a car crash won him an AP award his senior year.

He has written more than 1,000 articles for Forbes, Forbes Asia, and Forbes.com. He has profiled such influential figures as Ashton Kutcher, Katy Perry, Bruno Mars, Kendrick Lamar, Alex Rodriguez, 50 Cent, Toby Keith, Steve Wozniak, Alicia Keys, Swizz Beatz, Dr. Ruth, and Richard Branson.

He has written for The New York Times, The Washington Post, Billboard, McSweeney's, and other news outlets. He has also served as an expert source for CNBC, BBC, Bloomberg, Reuters, NPR, and other print, web, radio, and video outlets.

== Personal life ==
Both of Greenburg's parents are authors: his father, Dan Greenburg, authored the series The Zack Files and his mother, Suzanne O'Malley, is a former television writer (Law & Order) and the author of a book on Andrea Yates.

A former child actor, Zack played the title role in the film Lorenzo's Oil, alongside Nick Nolte and Susan Sarandon. He moved from New York to Hastings-on-Hudson, New York, and graduated from Hastings High School in 2003. Greenburg graduated from Yale College with a degree in American Studies and a concentration in Urban Studies, and started writing for Forbes magazine in 2007.

== Books ==
- Greenburg, Zack O'Malley (2020). A-List Angels: How a Band of Actors, Artists, and Athletes Hacked Silicon Valley. Little, Brown. ISBN 978-0316485111.
- 3 Kings: Diddy, Dr. Dre, Jay-Z and Hip-Hop's Multibillion-Dollar Rise. 2018. ISBN 978-1478911784.
- Greenburg, Zack O'Malley (2014). Michael Jackson, Inc.: The Rise, Fall and Rebirth of a Billion-Dollar Empire. Simon and Schuster. ISBN 978-1476705965.
- Greenburg, Zack O'Malley (2011). Empire State of Mind (book): How Jay-Z Went From Street Corner to Corner Office. Portfolio / Penguin. ISBN 978-1591845409.
