= R. Thomas Herman =

American journalist

R. Thomas "Tom" Herman is a former columnist for The Wall Street Journal.

Tom Herman wrote for The Wall Street Journal from 1968 until May 2009, when he retired as the newspaper's tax columnist and a senior special writer. Since then, he has continued writing for the Journal on a freelance basis and now writes a tax column for the newspaper's wealth management section. A 1968 graduate of Yale University, Herman was the Political Editor of the Yale Daily News and was in Davenport College, along with President George W. Bush. He taught a seminar on business journalism at Yale in 2006, 2007, 2009, 2010, 2011, 2012, 2014, 2015, 2016, 2017, 2018 and 2019. He taught a seminar on business journalism at the Columbia University Graduate School of Journalism from 2009 to 2016. He also has taught at the University of San Diego during the January–May semester since 2012. He was the tax columnist for The Fiscal Times, a Web site that focuses on taxes, budget issues, personal finance and related issues. He has received several journalism awards, including the Excellence in Financial Journalism Award from the New York State Society of Certified Public Accountants in 2011, 2009 and 2002. He also received the Sidney Kess/UJA-Federation of NY Award for “Excellence in Financial Reporting in the Field of Taxation” in 2001. In 2014, he received the Elliott V. Bell Award from the New York Financial Writers Association. The award is given annually to “an outstanding journalist for significant long-term contribution to the profession of financial journalism.”He and his wife Marilyn live in New York City and San Diego.
