= Borbay =

American artist

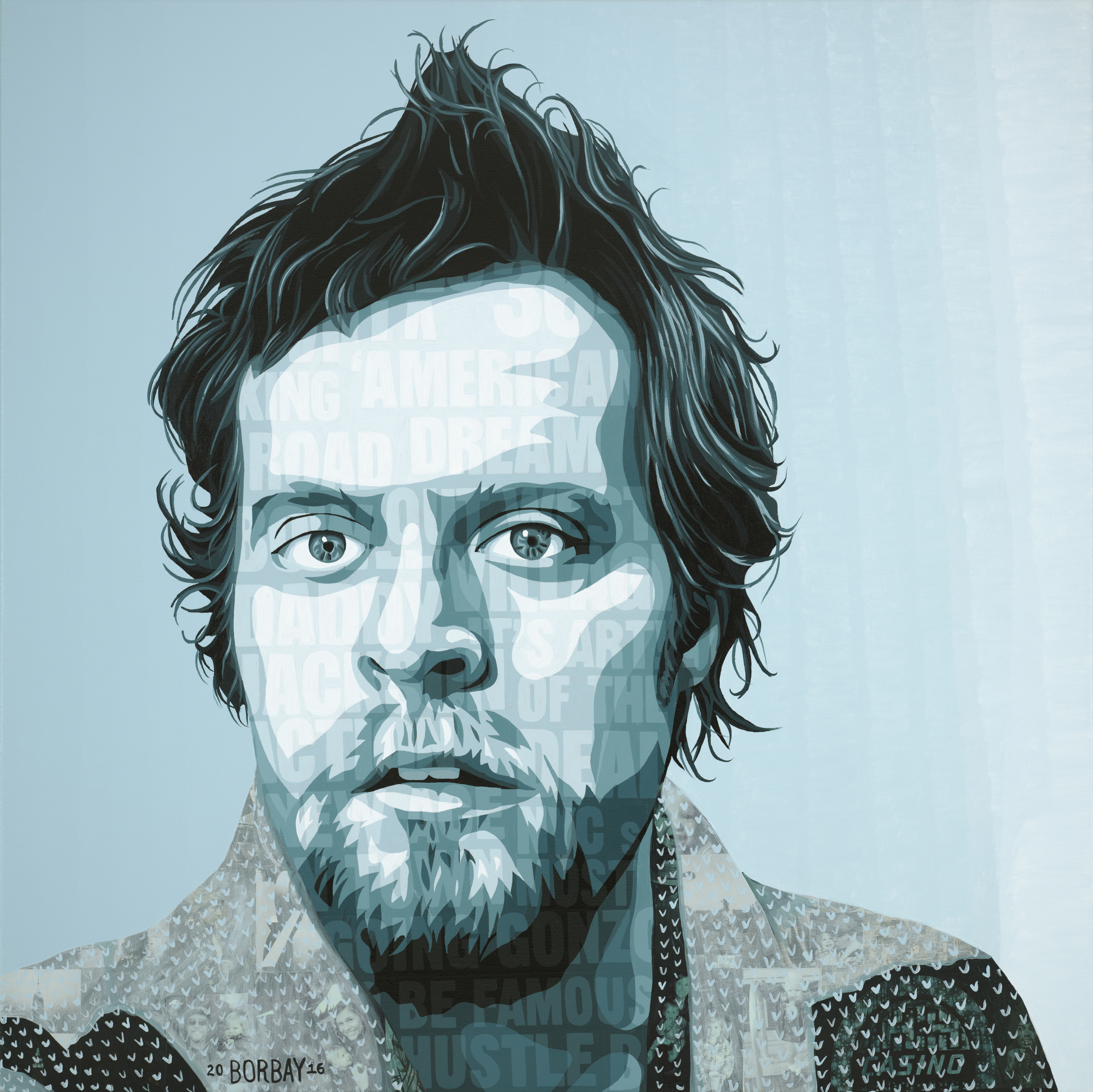
- Born: Jason T. Borbet; September 8, 1980; age 42; Rockville Centre, New York USA
- Education: BFA, Boston University (2003)
- Known for: Depicting Frank Lloyd Wright's Solomon R. Guggenheim Museum on canvas each year, for a 20-year-series.
- Notable work: KingsOfHipHop, 2011; Kick Ass Actors in Kick Ass Roles, 2013; Antiheroes, 2015; Guggenheim Series, 2009-2029; Vegas Vickie, 2022
- Style: Contemporary
- Website: www.borbay.com

Borbay (born Jason Borbet; September 8, 1980) is an American painter recognized for his location painting and portraiture. In 2009, Borbay commenced his 20-year project to depict Frank Lloyd Wright's Solomon R. Guggenheim Museum on canvas annually. A native of New York currently living and working in Victor, Idaho, near Grand Teton National Park in Wyoming, Borbet is self-represented.

== Background ==
Jason Borbet's employment prior to becoming a full-time artist in 2009 is varied. He spent time as a cast member on a reality television show based in Boston. He took on work as a stand-up comedian after moving to the Upper East Side of New York. He spent time recruiting and placing talent for a creative agency, then landed at Sweden's Fantasy Interactive, an award-winning design and development company.

Borbet names one of his biggest influences as his artist mother. He refers to July 2, 2009, as his “Independence Day.” This is the day that Jason Borbet decided to become a full-time artist, and take the name Borbay. In 2009, he was named “Most Creative New Yorker” by Time Out New York. He says of this title, “As for Time Out, [it is] certainly a beautiful recognition, but I'll never let anything effect what really matters — the hard work I do each day, week, month and year in the studio. Without the work, you are nothing."

== Location painting ==
Included in Borbay's portfolio is location painting, and his depiction of structure and architecture on canvas often features neon. As a mid-century symbol of success, neon lighting finds its place naturally within the works of Borbay. His treatment of a building when creating for a commission or otherwise is not strictly realistic, but includes his artist's voice. A prime example is his commissioned work depicting the former Tribeca Grand Hotel in New York City (now called the Roxy Hotel). This painting was commissioned for the CEO and founder of Bevforce. Borbay's 20-year project painting Frank Lloyd Wright's Solomon R. Guggenheim Museum in New York City (see below) exemplifies his take on the location genre in that it reflects a range of approaches to the canvas.

=== Guggenheim Series ===
In 2009, Borbay painted the image of Wright's Guggenheim, and wanted to do it again almost immediately. He decided to commit to a 20-year project, painting the New York City museum every year over two decades. The theme shifts each year, covering cultural events such as 2019's total solar eclipse in Guggenheim 10, and depicting a COVID-19 theme in the composition of 2020's Pandemic Guggenheim.

== Portraiture ==
Borbay's portraits are collage-based, and started taking shape in the 2010s. He uses both words and images to bolster a composition, personalizing the portrait with context surrounding the subject. His series of portrait collages Kick Ass Actors in Kick Ass Roles include Johnny Depp, Morgan Freeman, Uma Thurman, and Bill Murray. The text overlay on these original compositions was derived by Borbay from movie dialogue related the work of these actors in film.

His portrait work has been shown in the Major League Baseball Fan Cave, with portraits of Yankee players David Robertson and Robinson Cano featured. Borbay's Bill Murray portrait, entitled Dr. Bill Venkman was contributed to the book The Art of Being Bill: The Many Faces of Awesome. His portrait of Michael Jackson was used for the cover of the book Michael Jackson, Inc: The Rise, Fall and Rebirth of a Billion-Dollar Empire.

=== #KingsOfHipHop ===
In 2011, Borbay released his #KingsOfHipHop series, executed in his established collage-painting style. Of the eight hip-hop musicians chosen for this series, seven were also chosen by Forbes as the 2011 Hip Hop Cash Kings. The Forbes list shaped its standings around yearly earnings, while Borbay had selected his own criteria for choosing his subjects: each musician had to release an album within one year of January 2011, use social media with regularity, and possess entrepreneurial vision. When Borbay recognized the alignment with the Forbes list, he decided to exhibit the paintings by rank according to Forbes. Each of the seven paintings were shown at New York City's Publicis Modem's Meatpacking District Headquarters on September 15, 2011. Two of the works, Shady Will Rainbow Flag It and Diddy's Dirty Money White Party were donated by Borbay to the Universal Hip Hop Museum just after being exhibited.

== NFT Efforts ==
In 2022, the Circa Resort & Casino in Las Vegas launched its first NFT collection with the help of Borbay. This will allow collectors to have a digital piece of Vegas in the form of Vegas Vickie, the 25-foot tall neon cowgirl in downtown Las Vegas. The commodity of the NFT is based on an original painting of the massive neon figure by Borbay. The portrait itself is installed on the 60th floor of the resort inside the Legacy Club rooftop lounge. The Vegas Vickie NFT will provide other commodities to collectors such as special access to the resort and events that are held on the Circa property
