= Suzanne O'Malley =

American art dealer

- Born: April 6, 1951 (age 74); Cedar Rapids, Iowa, U.S.
- Education: University of Texas at Austin
- Occupation(s): Writer; Journalist; Screenwriter
- Spouse: Dan Greenburg (1980-1998)
- Children: Zack O'Malley Greenburg
- Parent(s): Donald Leo O'Malley; Irma B. O'Malley (née Waechter)

Suzanne O'Malley (born April 6, 1951) is an American writer, journalist, and screenwriter. O'Malley is the author of the New York Times Bestseller, Are You There Alone?: The Unspeakable Crime of Andrea Yates (Simon & Schuster), chronicling the life and crimes of Andrea Yates. She has been a screenwriter for Law & Order, Law & Order: Special Victims Unit, and New York Undercover.

== Early life and education ==
Suzanne O'Malley was born on April 6, 1951, to Donald Leo O'Malley and Irma B. O'Malley (née Waechter) in Cedar Rapids, Iowa. She graduated Phi Beta Kappa from the University of Texas at Austin with a Bachelor of Arts degree in psychology in 1973.

== Career ==
O'Malley relocated from Texas to New York City in 1973 to pursue a career in journalism. From 1973 to 1975 she was an account supervisor at the public relations firm Dorf/Muller Jordan Herrick; an editorial assistant at Esquire in 1975; an assistant editor at Esquire in 1976; an associate editor at Esquire in 1977; and the senior editor of Esquire from 1977 to 1978. From 1978 to 1980 O'Malley was the author of the Esquire column "Dining Out".

In 1983, O'Malley co-authored her first book with her then-husband, the writer Dan Greenburg, How to Avoid Love and Marriage. She went on to be the a contributing editor to New York Magazine from 1994 to 1996; an editor at large for Inside.com from 2001 to 2001; and later a freelance producer and on-air news consultant for National Broadcasting Corporation (NBC) and Microsoft National Broadcasting Company (MSNBC).

== Andrea Yates ==
In 2004, O'Malley wrote the book Are You There Alone?: The Unspeakable Crime of Andrea Yates. Employing her expertise in investigative journalism, O'Malley interviewed many of the people closest to the Andrea Yates case, including Yates's family members, friends, attorneys, and then current and previous mental health providers. Simultaneously, O'Malley has also had an ongoing mail correspondence with Yates during her incarceration. O'Malley presented varying viewpoints on Yates's life and crimes and uncovered that she likely suffered from previously unrecognized bipolar illness, despite she had been treated variously for diagnoses of depression, postpartum depression, and schizophrenia.

At Yates's original murder trial, when she confessed to drowning her children, a witness for the prosecution, psychiatrist Park Dietz, testified that shortly before the murders, an episode of Law & Order had aired featuring a woman who drowned her children and was acquitted of murder by reason of insanity. During Yates's 2005 trial at the Texas Court of Appeals, O'Malley, who was covering the trial for O: The Oprah Magazine, The New York Times Magazine, and NBC News, and had previously been a writer for Law & Order, reported that no such episode of Law & Order existed, resulting in Dietz admitting before the court that he had provided false testimony. The appellate court reversed Yates's conviction, holding unanimously that the jury might have been influenced by Dietz's false testimony and therefore a new trial would be necessary.

== Personal life ==
In 1980, O'Malley married the humorist and writer Dan Greenburg. They divided their time between their homes in Manhattan and East Hampton. Their only child, Zack O'Malley Greenburg, was born in 1985. O'Malley and Greenburg divorced in 1998. Their son, Zack became a child actor and played the title role in the 1992 American drama film Lorenzo's Oil, alongside Nick Nolte and Susan Sarandon, which earned two nominations at the 65th Academy Awards. He later became the senior editor at Forbes magazine, covering music, media and entertainment, and a New York Times Bestselling author of books, including Empire State of Mind: How Jay-Z Went From Street Corner to Corner Office and A-List Angels: How a Band of Actors, Artists, and Athletes Hacked Silicon Valley.
