= Joanne Lipman =

American journalist, editor, and author

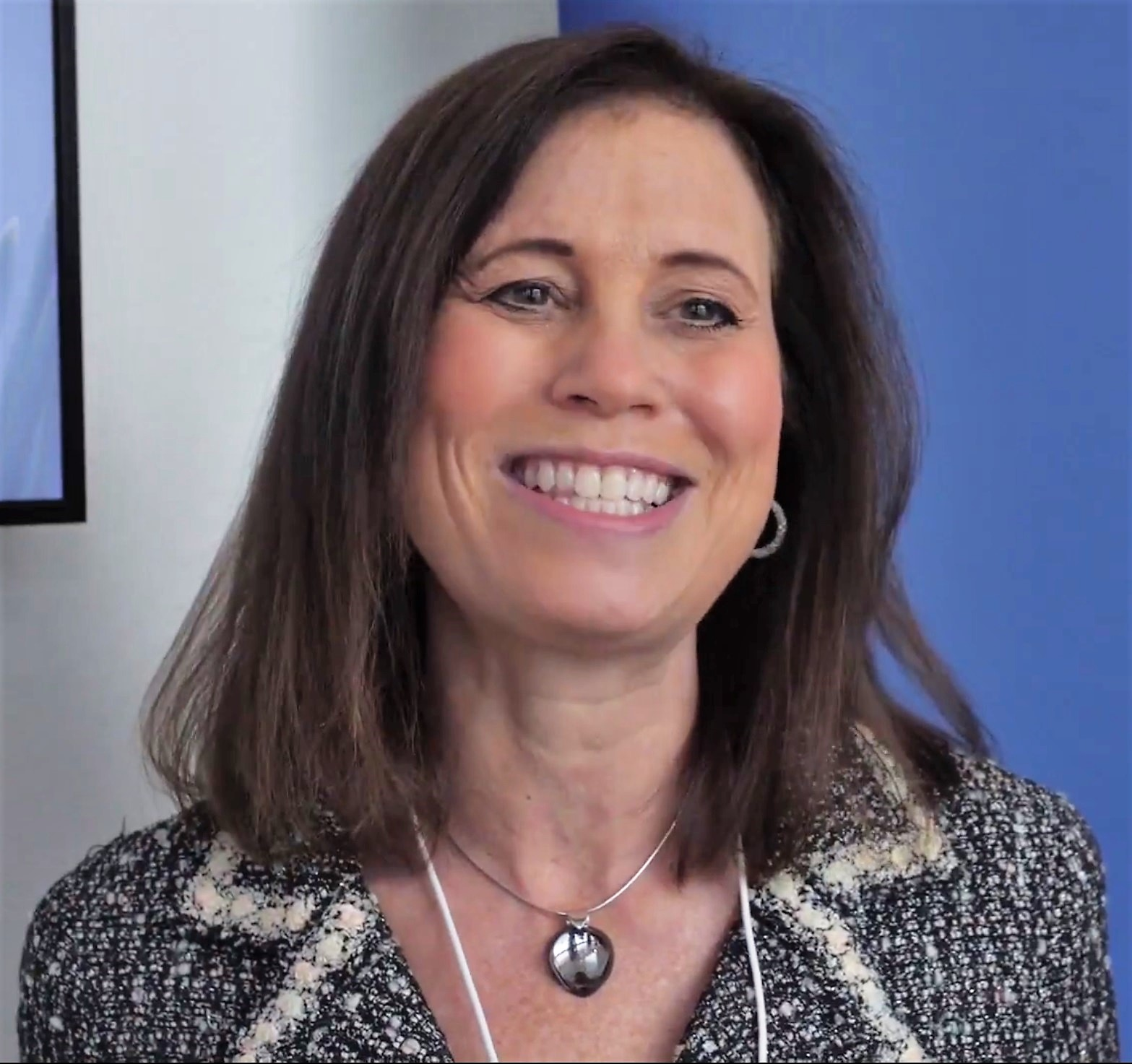
- Lipman at the World Economic Forum in 2018
- Born: June 18, 1961 (age 65); New Brunswick, New Jersey, U.S.
- Occupations: Journalist; editor; author
- Notable credit(s): "Strings Attached", The Wall Street Journal, Conde Nast, The New York Times

Joanne Lipman (born June 18, 1961) is an American journalist and author who has served as chief editor at USA Today, the USA Today Network, Conde Nast, and The Wall Street Journal's Weekend Journal. She is a Yale University lecturer and the author of three books includingThat's What She Said: What Men Need to Know (and Women Need to Tell Them) About Working Together and "NEXT: The Power of Reinvention in Life and Work." She is also the inaugural Peretsman Scully Distinguished Journalism Fellow at Princeton's Institute for Advanced Study and a CNBC on-air contributor.

Previously, she was chief content officer of publishing company Gannett, and editor-in-chief of USA Today and the publications in its network, such as the Detroit Free Press, The Des Moines Register and The Arizona Republic. She is co-author, with Melanie Kupchynsky, of Strings Attached: One Tough Teacher and the Gift of Great Expectations. She was the founding editor-in-chief of Conde Nast Portfolio magazine and Portfolio.com website from 2005 to 2009. Previously she was a deputy managing editor of The Wall Street Journal, the first woman to hold that position. She is a frequent television commentator on business issues, appearing on CNN, CNBC, CBS and other news outlets. She has also contributed to The New York Times.

== Biography and career ==
Lipman was raised in East Brunswick, New Jersey, the daughter of Diane H. and Burton E. Lipman. Her mother was a programmer analyst and her father was an author of business books and CEO of a cardiac pacemaker component manufacturing company. She graduated from East Brunswick High School and summa cum laude from Yale University with a B.A. degree in history. While a student at Yale, she worked as an intern for The Wall Street Journal, which she joined as a staff reporter upon graduating in 1983. In 1984 she reported that Alastair Reid, a staff writer for The New Yorker, had created composite characters and otherwise altered facts in his reporting. After covering the insurance and real estate beats, she created and wrote the Journal's daily Advertising column from 1989 through 1992. She served as a Page One editor of the Journal from 1992 through 1996.

In 1998, she created the Journal's popular Friday section, Weekend Journal. She served as its editor-in-chief through 2000, when she was named a Deputy Managing Editor of the newspaper, the first woman to hold that post. In 2002, she oversaw the creation of a new fourth section, Personal Journal. The New York Times described her role as the Journal's "innovator in chief."

In 2005, Lipman moved to Conde Nast to create Conde Nast Portfolio and Portfolio.com, a business magazine and website that launched in April 2007. The magazine was widely praised for its coverage leading up to and about the 2008 financial crisis, including its 2008 cover story by Michael Lewis that was the basis for his bestselling book, and subsequent film, The Big Short. However, following the 2008 financial crisis, Condé Nast suffered from declining advertising revenue leading it to close a number of its magazines, including Portfolio in May 2009 after 21 issues. The website, Portfolio.com, is now being run by a Conde Nast sister company, American City Business Journals.

Lipman serves on the Yale University Council, the Yale Daily News board of directors, and the Breastcancer.org advisory board. She is a member of the Council on Foreign Relations. She has served as a judge for the Pulitzer Prize and National Magazine Awards, among others.

== That's What She Said ==
Lipman's bestselling book, That's What She Said: What Men Need to Know (And Women Need to Tell Them) About Working Together, was published in 2018. The book contends that men must be mobilized to help close the gender gap at work, and offers strategies and solutions to help achieve workplace parity. Through a combination of reporting, data and storytelling, Lipman illuminates case studies spanning Silicon Valley, the Enron scandal, Harvard Business School's attempt to wipe out bias, and Iceland's response to the 2008 financial crisis.

The New York Times, in its review, called That's What She Said "eerily prescient in light of our current conversation about sexual politics in the workplace...revelatory" and named it an Editor's Choice. The book was named to the bestseller list of the Washington Post, which in its review said Lipman "makes a powerful case for men to join with women to solve the persistent inequities on the job" and "offers dozens of examples of bold leaders taking a stand and engaging women to push forward a transformation. But she also piles on the evidence of a sustained gender gap so that inequities cannot simply be mansplained away."

== Awards and honors ==
Under Lipman's leadership, the USA TODAY Network was awarded three Pulitzer Prizes, including the first Pulitzer in USA TODAY's history, and had an additional three finalists.

In 2008, Portfolio was awarded a National Magazine Award, with the magazine's "Brief" section cited for being "Consistently smart, contrarian, and well-reported....an original take on ambition, invention, ego, drama, and conflict. The surprisingly fresh and clean design complements and furthers and section's distinctive voice as it charts the impact of business on society, culture, and politics."

While on the Journal's Page One, Lipman edited a series that earned the paper the 1995 Pulitzer Prize in feature writing. In 2005, the Journal won two Pulitzer Prizes for coverage that appeared in Weekend Journal and Personal Journal.

Lipman received the John Hancock award in 1993 for Excellence for her daily Advertising column. In 2001, she received the Matrix Award from New York Women in Communications for achievement in the newspaper category.

== Personal ==
In 1987, Lipman married entertainment lawyer Thomas Distler in a Jewish ceremony at the National Arts Club in Manhattan; they have two children.

During the September 11 attacks, Lipman made the last recorded purchase at the World Trade Center's underground mall at 8:55 a.m., nine minutes after the first plane hit the North Tower. She bought two $5 refrigerator magnets for her daughter. At the time, Lipman was unaware of what had happened and assumed the commotion was a false alarm.
