= Cynthia Harris =

American actress (1934–2021)

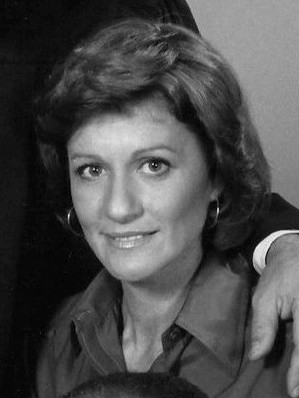
- Harris in 1976
- Born: Cynthia Lee Harris; August 9, 1934; New York City, U.S.
- Died: October 3, 2021 (aged 87); New York City, U.S.
- Education: Smith College
- Occupation: Actress
- Years active: 1963–2019
- Spouse: Eugene Wolsk (m. 1961; div. 1972)
- Partner: Nathan Silverstein

Cynthia Lee Harris (August 9, 1934 – October 3, 2021) was an American film, television, and stage actress. She is best known for her roles in the television series Edward & Mrs. Simpson and the sitcom Mad About You.

== Life and career ==
Cynthia Lee Harris was born in New York City in 1934, the daughter of Saul Harris, a haberdasher, and his wife, Deborah. She had two brothers, one of whom predeceased her. Interested in the stage from a young age, she began studying theater at age 12 and graduated from Smith College in 1955 with a degree in theater and literature.

She joined the Adams Memorial Theatre in Williamstown (in the same state on the campus of another college) where she performed in five summer seasons from 1955 to 1959. She then studied acting with Lee Strasberg at the Actors Studio. Harris also studied with George Morrison.

Harris appeared in such television series and TV movies, such as Archie Bunker's Place and All My Children. In Edward and Mrs. Simpson, she was cast as the Duchess of Windsor, which earned her a BAFTA Award nomination in 1979. For five seasons, she played "comic yenta mom" Sylvia Buchman on the sitcom Mad About You, a role she reprised in the show's 2019 limited series revival. For almost two decades, she played "Mrs. B." in television advertisements for the now-defunct department store chain Bradlees.

She made her Broadway debut as an understudy for the drama Natural Affection in 1963. In 1971, she appeared on Broadway in the Stephen Sondheim-George Furth musical, Company. In 1978, she received a BAFTA nomination for her performance as Wallis Simpson in Edward & Mrs. Simpson (1978).

Harris was one of the co-artistic directors for the Off-Broadway company The Actors Company Theatre, which she co-founded in 1993. She appeared in numerous plays with the company, including Home, Bedroom Farce and Lost in Yonkers, portraying nearly four dozen characters over the course of her tenure with the group. In 2013, Harris appeared as Adriana in the Primary Stages production of The Tribute Artist.

== Death ==
Harris died in New York City on October 3, 2021, at the age of 87. She was survived by her partner, Nathan Silverstein, as well as her brother and extended family. She had suffered from Type 1 diabetes for much of her life.

== Filmography ==
=== Film ===
Year	Title	Role
1968	Isadora	Mary
1972	Up the Sandbox	Stella
1973	I Could Never Have Sex with Any Man Who Has So Little Regard for My Husband	Laura
1982	Tempest	Cynthia
1983	Reuben, Reuben	Bobby Springer
1987	Three Men and a Baby	Mrs. Hathaway
1991	Mannequin Two: On the Move	Mom / Queen
1992	The Distinguished Gentleman	Vera Johnson

=== Television ===
Year	Title	Role	Notes
1975	The Bob Newhart Show	Diane Nugent	1 episode
1975	Kojak	Helen Fielding	1 episode
1976–1977	Sirota's Court	Court Clerk Maureen O'Conner	Main cast
1978	Edward and Mrs. Simpson	Wallis Warfield Simpson	Title role
1979	Husbands, Wives & Lovers	Paula Zuckerman	Main cast
1979	Three's Company	Mrs. Layton	1 episode
1980	Hart to Hart	Amanda	1 episode
1981	Archie Bunker's Place	Marcie Phillips	2 episodes
1982	Quincy, M.E.	Louise Asten	2 episodes
1986–1987	L.A. Law	Iris Hubbard	Recurring role (season 1)
1987	Izzy and Moe	Dallas Carter	TV movie
1987	The Equalizer	Judge Paula G. Walsh	Episode: "Carnal Persuasion"
1987	Everything's Relative	Gwen Spaulding	1 episode
1989	Kate & Allie	Laurel Jordan	1 episode
1989	American Playhouse	Elinor Leopold	Episode: "Ask Me Again" (S8.E2)
1989–1990	Ann Jillian	Sheila Hufnagel	Main cast
1990–1994	Murder, She Wrote	Phyllis Thurlow / Lauren Delagre	2 episodes
1991	Law & Order	Gifford	Episode: "Out of Control"
1993	Law & Order	Defense Attorney Professor Adele Diamond	Episode: "Discord"
1993–1999, 2019 revival	Mad About You	Sylvia Buchman	Recurring role (seasons 2–5, 8), main cast (seasons 6–7)
1994	All My Children	Patricia Hale	
1997	Law & Order	Defense Attorney Professor Adele Diamond	Episode: "Passion"
1999	Now and Again	Ms. Masters	1 episode
2000	The Geena Davis Show	Joyce Cochran	1 episode
2000	An American Daughter	Charlotte "Chubby" Hughes	TV movie
2004–2007	Rescue Me	Mike's Mom	3 episodes
