= J. C. Greenburg =

American writer

J. C. (Judith) Greenburg is the author of the Andrew Lost children's books. Her books blend science and adventure with fun.

== Early life and education ==
Greenburg is the daughter of Alphonse Wickroski, a chemist, and Sabina Wickroski. Greenburg completed her undergraduate degree as well as a master's degree in English literature and education at the University of Connecticut. Prior to February 1998, she worked for Worth Publishers as a textbook editor.

== Honors and awards ==
- 2003 Golden Duck Award for Excellence in Children's Science Fiction Literature, Middle Grades (Andrew Lost series)
- In April 2018, Greenburg was a featured speaker at the Esther Banker Memorial Series at the Byram Shubert Library in Greeenwich, Connecticut.

== Personal life ==
Greenburg married Dan Greenburg, in October 1998. Dan Greenburg has also published books, including The Zack Files series.
