= Empire State of Mind (book) =

2011 biography of Jay-Z by Zack O'Malley Greenburg

Empire State of Mind: How Jay-Z Went From Street Corner To Corner Office
- First edition
- Author: Zack O'Malley Greenburg
- Language: English
- Genre: Biography, non-fiction
- Publisher: Portfolio
- Publication date: 2011
- Publication place: United States
- Media type: Print (hardcover), E-Book
- Pages: 304
- ISBN: 978-1591848349

Empire State of Mind: How Jay-Z Went From Street Corner To Corner Office is a biography of hip-hop mogul Jay-Z by Zack O'Malley Greenburg. It was released in March 2011 by Portfolio, the Penguin Random House business imprint.

== Synopsis ==
From the official blurb: Empire State of Mind reveals the story behind Jay-Z's rise as told by the people who lived it with him, from classmates at Brooklyn's George Westinghouse High School and the childhood friend who got him into the drug trade, to the DJ who persuaded him to stop dealing and focus on the music. Now with new interviews with industry insiders like Russell Simmons, Alicia Keys, and J. Cole—more than one hundred in total—this book explains just how Jay-Z propelled himself from the bleak streets of Brooklyn to the heights of the business world. Noteworthy sources interviewed for this biography include Fab Five Freddy, Russell Simmons, Damon Dash, Alicia Keys and J. Cole.

== Reception ==
The book was cited by Bloomberg as "one of the year's best rock books" and praised by other outlets including CNN, which dubbed it "a superb guide for your career, even if you are looking to be an investment banker or grocery store manager instead of a hip hop legend.”
