= Portfolio.com =

American business website

- Website type: Business news
- Available in: English
- Owner: American City Business Journals
- Launched: April 2007
- Current status: Defunct as of 2016

Portfolio.com was an American business news website. It launched in 2007 as the online edition of the monthly business magazine Condé Nast Portfolio, published by Condé Nast until the magazine closed in April 2009. American City Business Journals then took over the site and ran it as a news service for small to mid-sized businesses (SMB) until June 2012, when it was rebranded as Upstart Business Journal. That publication closed in 2016.

Portfolio.com had several interactive features, including "BizWatch", which had updates on companies and executives from selected news sources.

== History ==
Portfolio.com's April 2007 launch by Condé Nast was heavily reported on due, in part, to its large estimated budget reported to be between $100 million and $125 million (covering multiple years of operation), and to the boldness of the publisher to launch a business magazine at a time when similar magazines such as BusinessWeek, Business 2.0, Forbes, and Fortune were struggling to sell advertising space.

In October 2008, the magazine reduced its staff by 20 percent, and changed to publishing only 10 times per year. The stand-alone website, portfolio.com, was merged with other Condé Nast Web sites, with advertising sales for the site handled by Wired Digital.

The magazine announced its closing on April 27, 2009. A sister company, American City Business Journals, took over the website. American City Business Journals is a division of Advance Publications and publishes 40 weekly newspapers about business in local communities and their companion websites. In June 2012 American City Business Journals re-branded the website to Upstart Business Journal; the website closed in 2016.

== Staff ==
J. Jennings Moss was Portfolio.com's editor. He had been a Managing Editor at FoxNews and Senior Editor-News Manager for ABCNews among other roles.

As a print magazine, Portfolio's 100-person editorial staff was led by editor-in-chief Joanne Lipman. During her 22-year tenure at The Wall Street Journal, Lipman was involved in the founding of the Weekend Journal, as well as the Personal Journal. The Managing Editor was Jacob Lewis, the Design Director was Robert Priest, the Articles Director was Kyle Pope.

== Content ==
Portfolio.com published regular business news stories and comprehensive findings of American City Business Journals' research studies, which were analyzed by Godfrey Phillips, Vice President for Research at American City Business Journals.

For the first time in 2010, Portfolio.com published the results of American City Business Journals' "SMB Insights: The Business of Brands", which rated more than 200 business brands across seven key attributes to determine overall rankings of brand strength. Additional studies included information on investing and brand-preferences by SMB owners, how SMB owners are using the Internet to improve their businesses.
