= Leukoencephalopathy with vanishing white matter =

Neurological disease

- Other names: Childhood ataxia with central nervous system hypomyelinization, Vanishing white matter leukodystrophy, Cree leukoencephalopathy, Vanishing white matter leukodystrophy with ovarian failure, included, Myelinopathia centralis diffusa
- This condition is inherited in an autosomal recessive manner

Leukoencephalopathy with vanishing white matter (VWM disease) is an autosomal recessive neurological disease. The cause of the disease are mutations in any of the 5 genes encoding subunits of the translation initiation factor eIF2B: EIF2B1, EIF2B2, EIF2B3, EIF2B4, or EIF2B5. The disease belongs to a family of conditions called the Leukodystrophies.

== Symptoms and signs ==
Onset usually occurs in childhood, however some adult cases have been found. Generally, physicians look for the symptoms in children. Symptoms include cerebellar ataxia, spasticity, optic atrophy, epilepsy, loss of motor functions, irritability, vomiting, coma, and even fever has been tied to VWM. The neurological disorders and symptoms which occur with VWM are not specific to countries; they are the same all over the world. Neurological abnormalities may not always be present in those who experience onset as adults. Symptoms generally appear in young children or infants who were previously developing fairly normally.

== Causes ==
VWM is a leukodystrophy which has unique biochemical abnormalities. A unique characteristic of VWM is that only oligodendrocytes and astrocytes are negatively affected while other glial cells and neurons seem to be unaffected. This is the central question behind VWM. The real reasons behind this behavior are unknown since the cells are in the brain and have been rarely studied. However, there is a theory which is generally accepted by most experts in the field. The main characteristic of these cells is the fact that they synthesize a lot of proteins. These cells produce a large amount of proteins from a small amount of precursors and so are constantly working and under a reasonable amount of stress. So with a mutation in eIF2B, slight increases in the amount of stress these cells encounter occur, making them more susceptible to failure due to stress. The large amount of oligodendrocytes which display apoptotic characteristics and express apoptotic proteins suggests cell number reduction in the early stages of the disease. Premature ovarian failure has also been associated with diminishing white matter. However through an intensive survey, it was determined that even if an individual has premature ovarian failure, she does not necessarily have VWM.

=== eIF2B's role ===
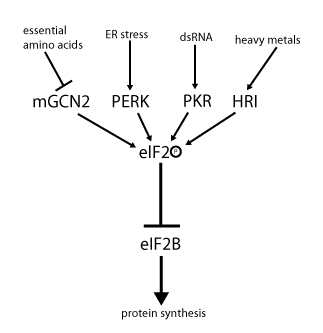
Overview of eIF2 and eIF2B's purpose in cells

eIF2B is the guanine nucleotide-exchange factor for eIF2, and is composed of 5 subunits. The largest subunit, eIF2B5 contains the most mutations for VWM. eIF2B is a complex which is very involved with the regulation of in the translation of mRNA into proteins. eIF2B is essential for the exchange of guanosine diphosphate(GDP) for guanosine-5'-triphosphate(GTP) in the initiation of translation via eIF2, because eIF2 is regenerated through this exchange. A decrease in eIF2B activity has been correlated with the onset of VWM. A common factor among VWM patients is mutations in the five subunits of eIF2B (21 discovered thus far), expressed in over 60% of the patients. These mutations lead to the decreased activity of eIF2B. The most common mutation is R113H, which is the mutation of histidine to arginine. The homozygous form of the mutation is the least severe form. This mutation has also been documented in rodents, but they do not acquire VWM, while humans do. Another common mutation is G584A found in the eIF2B5 subunit. A correlation with stress has also been made, as eIF2B plays a central role in stress management – it is essential in down regulation protein synthesis in different stress conditions – and VWM patients are highly sensitive to stress. Protein eIF2B exists in all cells, and if this protein is reduced enough the cell will be negatively affected, and if it is reduced to zero, the cell will die. In affected cells, the protein is reduced to about 50%, which is acceptable for functionality in most cells, but not in glial cells since they synthesize a large amount of proteins constantly and need as many functioning proteins within them as possible. This would lower the baseline of the amount of stress a cell can handle, and thus in a stressed environment, it would have detrimental effects on these cells. Mutations in three of the subunits of eIF2B (2,4,&5) has been seen in both VWM and premature ovarian failure. The North American Cree population has also been found to have a distinctive mutation, R195H, which can lead to VWM. All patients who have been studied only have one mutation present in the gene, causing the eIF2B to still be active, which leads to VWM. If two mutations occurred, then eIF2B activity would be stopped by the body.

== Neuropathology ==
Upon autopsy, the full effect of VWM has been documented. The gray matter remains normal in all characteristics while the white matter changes texture, becoming soft and gelatinous. Rarefaction of the white matter is seen through light microscopy and the small number of axons and U-fibers that were affected can also be seen. Numerous small cavities in the white matter are also apparent. The key characteristic that sets VWM apart from the other leukodystrophies is the presence of foamy oligodendrocytes. These foamy oligodendrocytes tend to have increased cytoplasmic structures, a greater number of irregular mitochondria and a higher rate of apoptosis. Abnormally shaped astrocytes with fibrile infections are very prevalent throughout the capillaries in the brain. Strangely, astrocytes are affected more than oligodendrocytes; there is even a reduction in the astrocyte progenitors, yet axons remain relatively unharmed.

== Diagnosis ==
Most diagnosis occurs in the early years of life around 2 to 6 years old. There have been cases in which onset and diagnosis have occurred late into adulthood. Those with onset at this time have different signs, particularly the lack of cognitive deterioration. Overall, detection of adult forms of VWM is difficult as MRI was not a common tool when they were diagnosed. Common signs to look for include chronic progressive neurological deterioration with cerebellar ataxia, spasticity, mental decline, decline of vision, mild epilepsy, hand tremor, the ability to chew and swallow food becomes difficult, rapid deterioration and fibrile infections following head trauma or fright, loss of motor functions, irritability, behavioural changes, vomiting, and even coma. Those who go into coma, if they do come out usually die within a few years. The diagnosis can be difficult if the physician does not take an MRI.

=== Case report on diagnosis of adult-onset VWM ===
The individual was examined at age 32, but he stated that he started noting differences 5 years before. He noticed sexual impotency, social isolation, unexplained aggression and sadness, loss of motivation, inert laughs, auditory hallucinations, thought insertion, delusions, and imperative commenting. He showed very minimal physical impairments, commonly seen in child-onsets. However, his MRI showed characteristic signs of VWM disease.

=== MRI ===
The MRI of patients with VWM shows a well defined leukodystrophy. These MRIs display reversal of signal intensity of the white matter in the brain. Recovery sequences and holes in the white matter are also visible. Over time, the MRI is excellent at showing rarefaction and cystic degeneration of the white matter as it is replaced by fluid. To show this change, displaying white matter as a high signal (T2-weighted), proton density, and Fluid-attenuated inversion recovery (FLAIR) images are the best approach. T2-weighted images also displaying cerebrospinal fluid and rarefied/cystic white matter. To view the remaining tissue, and get perspective on the damage done (also helpful in determining the rate of deterioration) (T1-weighted), proton density, and FLAIR images are ideal as they show radiating stripe patterns in the degenerating white matter. A failure of MRI images is their ineffectiveness and difficulty in interpretation in infants since the brain has not fully developed yet. Though some patterns and signs may be visible, it is still difficult to conclusively diagnose. This often leads to misdiagnosis in infants particularly if the MRI results in equivocal patterns or because of the high water content in infants' brains. The easiest way to fix this problem is a follow-up MRI in the following weeks. A potentially similar appearance of MRI with white matter abnormalities and cystic changes may be seen in some patients with hypomelanosis of Ito, some forms of Lowe's (oculocerebrorenal) disease, or some of the mucopolysaccharidoses.

=== Common misdiagnosis ===
Often with VWM, the lack of knowledge of the disease causes a misdiagnosis among physicians. As VWM is a member of the large group of leukodystrophy syndromes, it is often misdiagnosed as another type such as metachromatic leukodystrophy. More often than not, it is simply classified as a non-specific leukodystrophy. The characteristics of the brain upon autopsy are often very similar to atypical diffuse sclerosis, such as the presence of fibrillary astrocytes and scant sudanophilic lipids. Adult-onset VWM disease can present with psychosis and may be hard to differentiate from schizophrenia. Common misdiagnosis from misinterpreting the MRI include asphyxia, congenital infections, metabolic diseases.

Multiple sclerosis is often a misdiagnosis, but only in children due to its neurological characteristics, onset in early years, and MRI abnormalities. However, there are many differences between the two diseases. The glial cells express a loss of myelin. This loss of myelin is different from that seen in other diseases where hypomyelination occurs. In VWM, the cells never produce the normal amounts, whereas with diseases like MS, the cells' normal amounts are deteriorated. Also, with MS, the demyelination occurs due to inflammation, which is not the case in VWM. Cell differences include a lower penetration of the macrophages and microglia, as well as the lack of T cells and B cells in VWM. Finally, patients with MS have widespread demyelination, but those with VWM only express demyelination in a localized area.

Some atypical forms of multiple sclerosis (multiple sclerosis with cavitary lesions) can be specially difficult to differentiate but there are some clues in MRI imaging that can help.

== Treatment ==
There are no treatments, only precautions which can be taken, mainly to reduce trauma to the head and avoiding physiological stress. Melatonin has been shown to provide cytoprotective traits to glial cells exposed to stressors such as excitotoxicity and oxidative stress. These stressors would be detrimental to cells with a genetically reduced activity of protein eIF2B. However, research connecting these ideas have not been conducted yet.

== Epidemiology ==
Extensive pathological and biochemical tests were performed, however the cause was found by studying a small population in which mutations in the eIF2B gene were found. No effective systemic studies have been conducted to determine the incidence around the world, but through the studies conducted thus far, it appears to be more prevalent in the white populations. VWM appears to have a lower number of cases in the Middle East, and Turkey has not yet had a reported case. Its prevalence is limited by the physician's ability to identify the disease. As of 2006, more than 200 people have been identified with VWM, many of whom were originally diagnosed with an unclassified leukodystrophy.

== History ==
The first time this disease was documented was in 1962 when Eickle studied a 36-year-old woman. Her first symptoms, gait difficulties and secondary amenorrhoea, occurred when she was 31 years old. Throughout the duration of her life, she experienced chronic episodes with extensive deterioration of her brain following minor physical trauma. Upon death, autopsy was performed in which the cerebral white matter displayed dispersed cystic areas. These areas were surrounded by a dense net of oligodendrocytes in which only mild fibrillary astrocytes and scant sudanophilic lipids were found.

As the years progressed, more accounts of similar patients with similar symptoms were documented; however no one classified all the accounts as the same disease. It was not until 1993-94 when Dr. Hanefeld and Dr. Schiffmann and their colleagues identified the disease as childhood-onset progressive leukoencephalopathy. They determined it was autosomal recessive. They too saw that head trauma was a trigger for the onset of VWM. The key factor which allowed them to connect these patients together was the results of the magnetic-resonance spectroscopy in which the normal white matter signals were gone and often replaced with resonances indicative of lactate and glucose. They determined the cause was hypomyelination. in 1997–98, Dr. Marjo S. van der Knaap and colleagues saw the same characteristics in another set of patients, but these patients also expressed febrile infections. Dr. van der Knaap used MRI as well as magnetic-resonance spectroscopy and determined that ongoing cystic degeneration of the cerebral white matter and matter rarefaction was more descriptive of the disease rather than hypomyelination and proposed the name vanishing white matter. The name proposed by Dr. Schiffmann in 1994, childhood ataxia with central hypomyelination (CACH) is another commonly accepted name.

== See also ==
- The Stennis Foundation
- CADASIL (Cerebral Autosomal Dominant Arteriopathy with Subcortical Infarcts and Leukoencephalopathy)
- Progressive multifocal leukoencephalopathy
- Metachromatic leukodystrophy
- General leukoencephalopathies
