= EIF2B =

Multisubunit guanine nucleotide exchange factor

eIF2B is a protein complex found in eukaryotes. It is the guanine nucleotide exchange factor for the eukaryotic initiation factor 2 and therefore converts the inactive eIF2-GDP to the active eIF2-GTP. This activation is hindered by phosphorylation of the alpha subunit of eIF2, which leads to a stable eIF2α-P-GDP-eIF2B complex and therefore inhibits translation initiation.

Human genes which encode eIF-2B proteins include:

- EIF2B1 – alpha subunit (26kDa)
- EIF2B2 – beta subunit (39kDa)
- EIF2B3 – gamma subunit (58kDa)
- EIF2B4 – delta subunit (67kDa)
- EIF2B5 – epsilon subunit (82kDa)
