= Aspartate–tRNA ligase, cytoplasmic =

Enzyme found in humans

DARS1

Identifiers
- Aliases: DARS1, HBSL, aspRS, aspartyl-tRNA synthetase, aspartyl-tRNA synthetase 1, DARS
- External IDs: OMIM: 603084; MGI: 2442544; GeneCards: DARS1
Available structures
PDB	Ortholog search: PDBe RCSB
PDB	List of PDB id codes 4J15
Enzyme activity
EC #	BRENDA	ExPASy	KEGG	MetaCyc
6.1.1.12	↗	↗	↗	↗

Gene location (Human)
Chr.	Chromosome 2 (human)
Band	2q21.3	Start	135,905,881 bp
Band	2q21.3	End	135,986,100 bp

Gene location (Mouse)
Chr.	Chromosome 1 (mouse)
Band	1|1 E3	Start	128,291,444 bp
Band	1|1 E3	End	128,345,105 bp
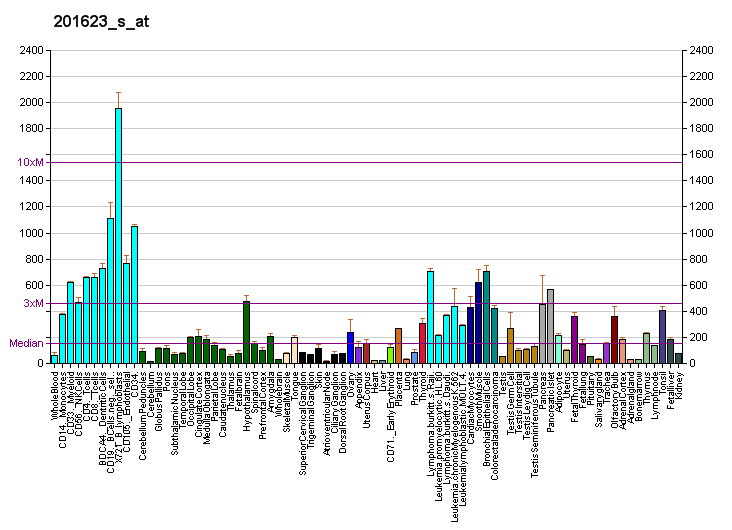

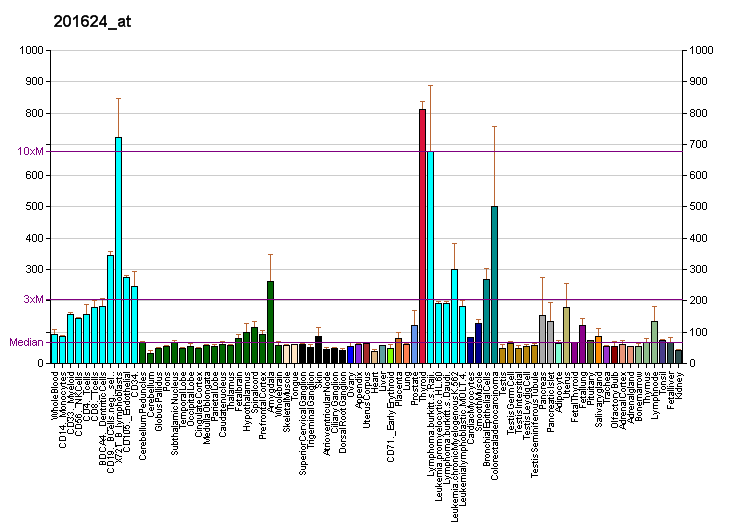
RNA expression pattern
Bgee	Human / Mouse (ortholog); Top expressed in: oocyte; pericardium; cartilage tissue; ventricular zone; secondary oocyte; parotid gland; beta cell; nipple; vena cava; seminal vesicula / Top expressed in: yolk sac; spermatocyte; epiblast; ventricular zone; embryo; granulocyte; migratory enteric neural crest cell; spermatid; embryo; muscle of thigh; More reference expression data
BioGPS	More reference expression data
Gene ontology
Molecular function	aspartate-tRNA ligase activity; aminoacyl-tRNA ligase activity; nucleotide binding; ligase activity; protein binding; ATP binding; aminoacylase activity; nucleic acid binding; RNA binding
Cellular component	extracellular exosome; membrane; cytoplasm; aminoacyl-tRNA synthetase multienzyme complex; cytosol; synapse
Biological process	tRNA aminoacylation for protein translation; protein biosynthesis; aspartyl-tRNA aminoacylation; protein-containing complex assembly
Sources:Amigo / QuickGO
Orthologs
Databases	NCBI: entry; OMA: entry
Species	Human	Mouse
Entrez	1615	226414
Ensembl	ENSG00000115866	ENSMUSG00000026356
UniProt	P14868	Q922B2
RefSeq (mRNA)	NM_001349; NM_001293312	NM_145507; NM_177445
RefSeq (protein)	NP_001280241; NP_001340	NP_663482; NP_803228
Location (UCSC)	Chr 2: 135.91 – 135.99 Mb	Chr 1: 128.29 – 128.35 Mb
PubMed search
- Wikidata
View/Edit Human	View/Edit Mouse

Aspartate–tRNA ligase, cytoplasmic, also called aspartyl-tRNA synthetase 1, is an enzyme that in humans is encoded by the DARS1 gene (previously DARS).

The DARS1 enzyme is part of a multienzyme complex of aminoacyl-tRNA synthetases. Aspartyl-tRNA synthetase charges its cognate tRNA with aspartate during protein biosynthesis.

== Clinical significance ==
Mutations in DARS1 have been identified as the cause of leukoencephalopathy, hypomyelination with brain stem and spinal cord involvement and leg spasticity (HBSL).

== See also ==
- Aspartate–tRNA ligase (enzyme class)
- Aspartate–tRNA ligase, mitochondrial (DARS2)
