= Leukoencephalopathy =

Term to describe all brain white-matter diseases

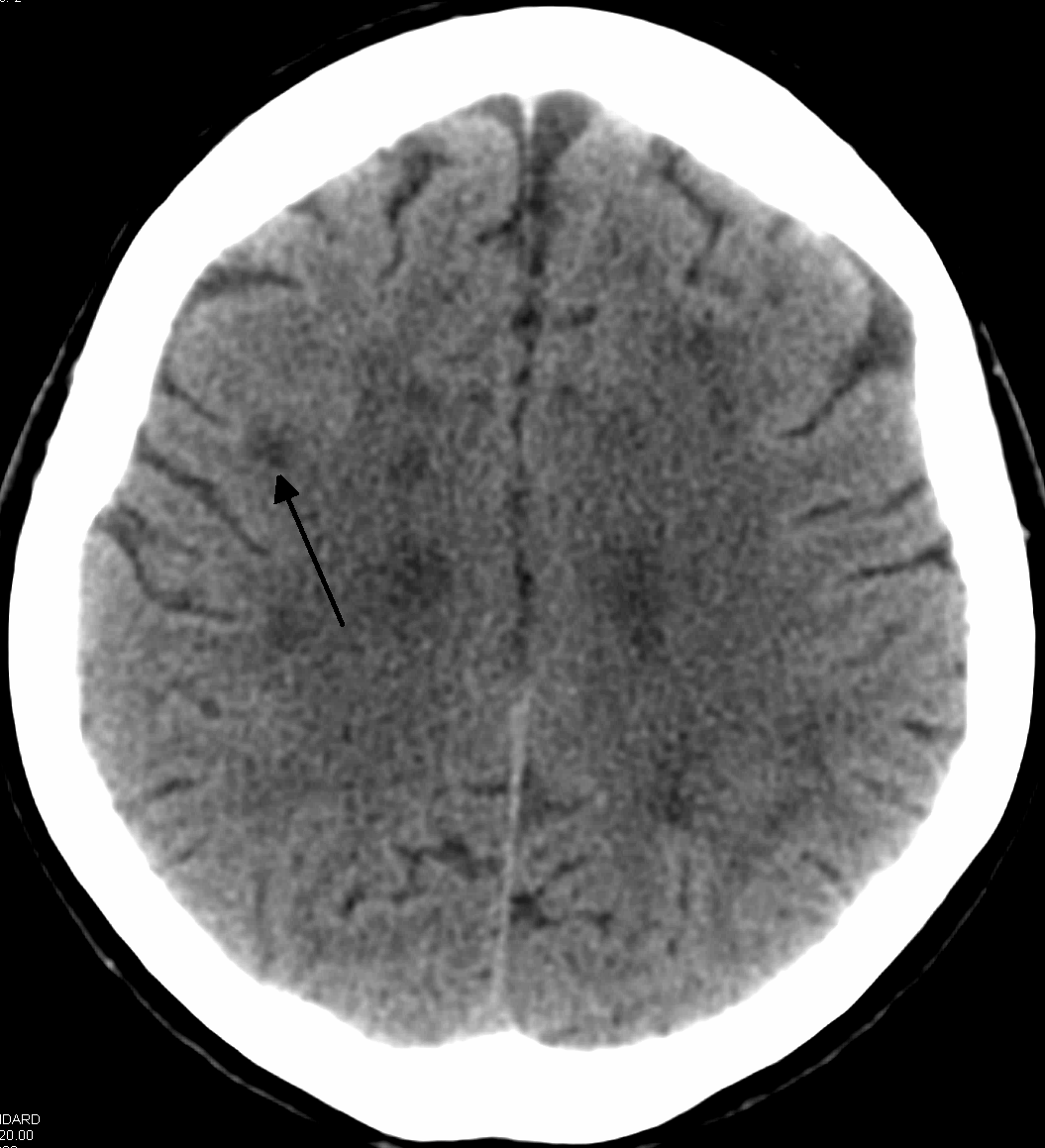
A CT of leukoencephalopathy

Leukoencephalopathy (leukodystrophy-like diseases) is a term that describes all of the brain white matter diseases, whether their molecular cause is known or unknown. It can refer specifically to any of these diseases:

- Progressive multifocal leukoencephalopathy
- Toxic leukoencephalopathy
- Leukoencephalopathy with brainstem and spinal cord involvement and lactate elevation
- Leukoencephalopathy with vanishing white matter
- Leukoencephalopathy with neuroaxonal spheroids
- Reversible posterior leukoencephalopathy syndrome
- Megalencephalic leukoencephalopathy with subcortical cysts. It can also refer to gene MLC1 or Megalencephalic leukoencephalopathy with subcortical cysts 1, a human gene related to the former disease.
- Hypertensive leukoencephalopathy

The classification of leukoencephalopathies is a matter of debate. Some authors divide leukoencephalopathies into hereditary disorders and acquired disorders. The hereditary demyelinating disorders are then classified according to the localization of the underlying metabolic defect, and they include the leukodystrophies when myelin growth is the underlying problem.

The acquired demyelinating diseases are classified according to their underlying causes into five groups: noninfectious–inflammatory, infectious–inflammatory, toxic–metabolic, hypoxic–ischemic (vascular problems like Binswanger's disease), and traumatic.

This classification is diffuse sometimes. For example CADASIL syndrome is at the same time hereditary and hypoxic.
