= Megalencephalic leukoencephalopathy with subcortical cysts =

- Other names: Vacuolating megalencephalic leukoencephalopathy with subcortical cysts

Megalencephalic leukoencephalopathy with subcortical cysts (MLC, or Van der Knaap disease) is a form of hereditary CNS demyelinating disease. It belongs to a group of disorders called leukodystrophies. It is characterized by early-onset enlargement of the head (macrocephaly) as well as delayed-onset neurological deterioration to include spasticity, epilepsy, and lack of muscular coordination. MLC does not appear to be a disease that is fatal at birth or early in life despite its symptoms, although the number of patients throughout history known to have the disease is fairly limited.

It belongs to a group of disorders called leukodystrophies. A series of cases with megalencephalic leukodystrophy were described by the Indian neurologist Bhim Sen Singhal (1933-) in 1991. However, it is sometimes referred to as Van der Knaap disease after the Dutch neurologist Marjo van der Knaap who described another series of cases with clinical and radiological features in 1995.

There are three types of Megalencephalic leukoencephalopathy distinguished by the affected gene: Type 1 caused by autosomal recessive mutations on the MLC1 gene, Type 2A an autosomal recessive mutation on the HEPACAM gene, and Type 2B an autosomal dominant mutation on the HEPACAM gene.

== Signs and symptoms ==
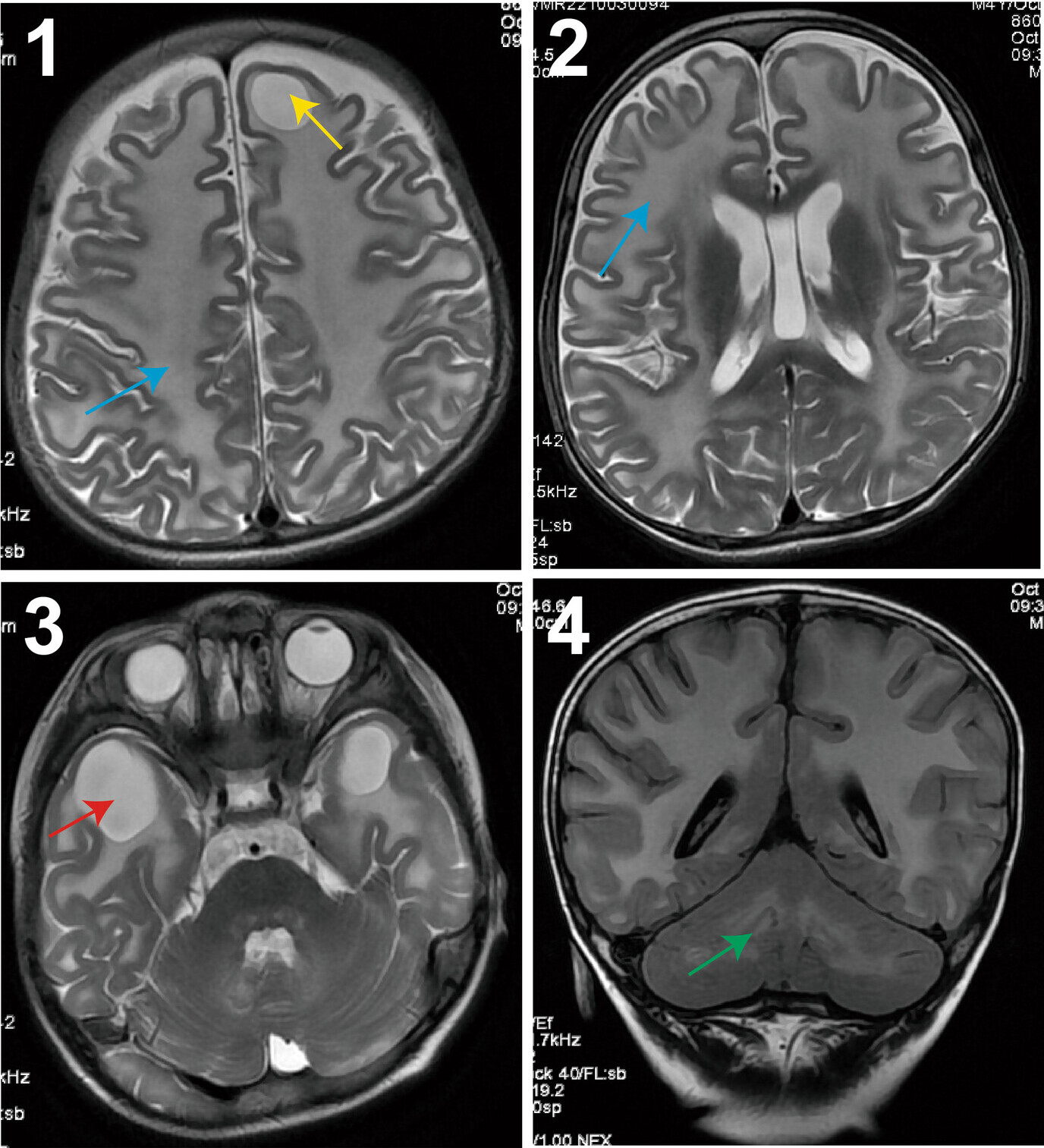
This illustration shows brain MRI of the patient, it revealed diffuse swelling of the white matter, accompanied by cysts in the frontal and temporal lobes, as well as mild abnormal signals in the cerebellar white matter.

The disease presents with various signs and symptoms affecting different parts of the body.

In the head, patients exhibit macrocephaly. This is characterized by megalencephaly, which is the enlargement of the brain leading to an increase in the size of the actual head.

In the central nervous system, several symptoms are observed. Megalencephaly, the enlargement of the brain, is notable as it represents the "M" in MLC. Ataxia, particularly slow, progressive, and early onset cerebellar ataxia, is common among many patients. Spasticity, characterized by muscle spasms, is frequently reported in individuals with MLC. Seizures and delays in motor development are also prevalent. Additionally, mild intellectual disability can be observed. Patients often exhibit diffuse swelling of the cerebral white matter and large subcortical cysts in the frontal and temporal lobes, with cysts developing on the tips of the temporal and subcortical areas.

Other significant central nervous system symptoms include diffuse spongiform leukoencephalopathy and vacuolizing myelinopathy. In vacuolizing myelinopathy, the protective myelin sheath on neurons pulls away from their cells, forming small holes in nerve fibers. This condition adversely affects coordination and walking ability.

== Genetics ==
It is associated with MLC1. The MLC1 gene is located in chromosome 22q13.33 and is in the genomic coordinates 22:50,059,390 – 50,085874. The gene contains 12 exons and that contain a start codon in exon 2 and an untranslated region in the 3’ end. The MLC1 gene product is a 377 amino acid protein highly expressed in the brain. The disease is caused by a homozygous or compound heterozygous mutation in the gene, MLC1. Previous research indicates that deficiency of cell surface protein expression of the MLC1 gene is the basis for the disorder. The mutant protein is expressed in intracellular compartments reducing the membrane surface expression when compared to the wild type.. Additional mutations in HEPACAM, GPRC5B, and AQP-4 have been identified in patients with MLC.

== Diagnosis ==
Diagnosis of Megalencephalic leukoencephalopathy with subcortical cysts is made with a combination of physical and clinical evaluations. The presence of frontal and temporal subcortical cysts is the main factor when diagnosing a patient with this disease. In the late stages of the disease, patients have been noted to develop impaired coordination, overresponsive reflexes, and even seizures. MRI testing is used to study and diagnose patients with this disease. A study conducted on four patients with this disease yielded similar MRI results despite their slightly differing symptoms. Genetic testing can show whether or not the individual has a mutation in the MLC1 gene, which accounts for 75% of all cases.

== Management ==
There currently is not a known cure for this disease. However, there are treatment options to mitigate the effects of symptoms that come with this disease. The drug Carbamazepine is an anticonvulsant drug commonly used to treat seizures and nerve pain. A case with a five-year-old girl indicated the ability of this drug to reduce the effects of seizures linked to this disease.

== Epidemiology ==
Most of the cases were studied in Turkish families who were part of consanguineous marriages (marrying relatives or the "same blood").

== History ==
A series of cases with megalencephalic leukodystrophy were described by the Indian neurologist Bhim Sen Singhal (1933-)in 1991. However, it is sometimes referred to as Van der Knaap disease after the Dutch neurologist Marjo van der Knaap who described another series of cases with clinical and radiological features in 1995.
