= Aspartate–tRNA ligase =

Class of enzymes

Identifiers
- EC no.: 6.1.1.12
- CAS no.: 9027-32-1

Databases
- BRENDA: enzyme data
- ExPASy: NiceZyme view
- KEGG: enzyme entry
- MetaCyc: metabolic pathway
- Rhea: reactions
- PDB structures: RCSB PDB PDBe PDBsum
- Gene Ontology: AmiGO / QuickGO
Search
- PMC: articles
- PubMed: articles
- NCBI: proteins

In enzymology, an aspartate–tRNA ligase (EC 6.1.1.12) is an enzyme that catalyzes the chemical reaction

ATP + L-aspartate + tRNA^{Asp} $\rightleftharpoons$ AMP + diphosphate + L-aspartyl-tRNA^{Asp}

The 3 substrates of this enzyme are ATP, L-aspartate, and tRNA^{Asp}, whereas its 3 products are AMP, diphosphate, and L-aspartyl-tRNA^{Asp}.

In humans, there are two isozymes encoded by the genes DARS1 and DARS2.

This enzyme belongs to the family of ligases, to be specific those forming carbon–oxygen bonds in aminoacyl-tRNA and related compounds. The systematic name of this enzyme class is L-aspartate:tRNA^{Asp} ligase (AMP-forming). Other names in common use include aspartyl-tRNA synthetase, aspartyl ribonucleic synthetase, aspartyl-transfer RNA synthetase, aspartic acid translase, aspartyl-transfer ribonucleic acid synthetase, and aspartyl ribonucleate synthetase. This enzyme participates in alanine and aspartate metabolism and aminoacyl-tRNA biosynthesis.

== Structural studies ==
As of late 2007, 10 structures have been solved for this class of enzymes, with PDB accession codes PDB: 1ASY, PDB: 1ASZ, PDB: 1B8A, PDB: 1C0A, PDB: 1EFW, PDB: 1EOV, PDB: 1EQR, PDB: 1G51, PDB: 1IL2, and PDB: 1L0W.
