= Hereditary CNS demyelinating disease =

- Specialty: Neurology, medical genetics, endocrinology

A hereditary CNS demyelinating disease is a demyelinating central nervous system disease that is primarily due to an inherited genetic condition. (This is in contrast to autoimmune demyelinating conditions, such as multiple sclerosis, or conditions such as central pontine myelinolysis that are associated with acute acquired insult.)

Examples include:

- Alexander disease
- Canavan disease
- Krabbe disease
- leukoencephalopathy with vanishing white matter
- megalencephalic leukoencephalopathy with subcortical cysts
- metachromatic leukodystrophy
- X-linked adrenoleukodystrophy
