= Marjo van der Knaap =

Dutch professor of pediatric neurology

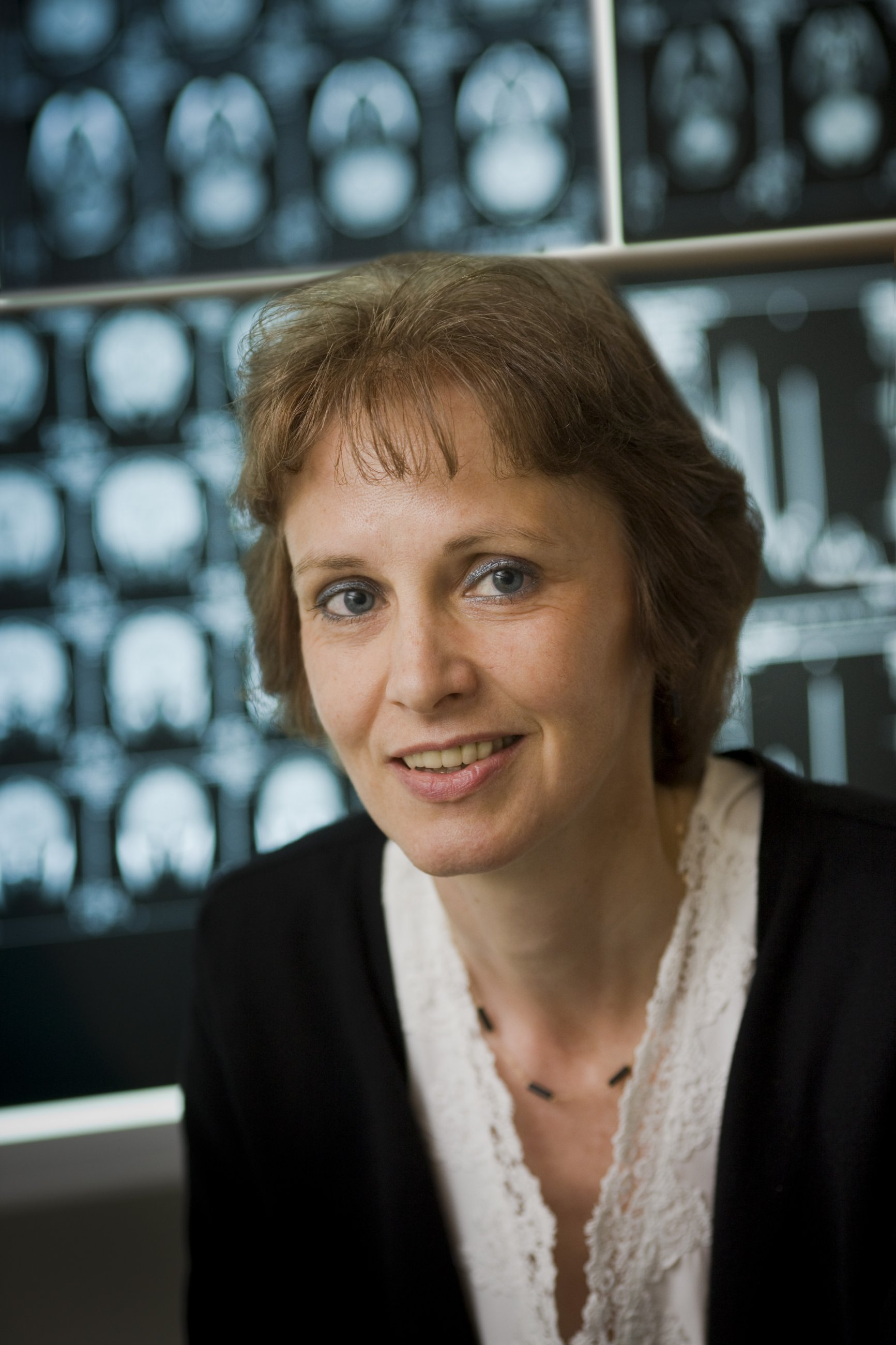
Marjo van der Knaap (2008)

Marjo S. van der Knaap (born 9 May 1958) is a Dutch professor of pediatric neurology at VU University Amsterdam and Amsterdam University Medical Centers. She was a winner of the 2008 Spinoza Prize. Her research focuses on white matter disorders.

== Early life and education ==
Van der Knaap was born on 9 May 1958 in Delft. In 1984 she obtained a cum laude degree in medicine from Erasmus University Rotterdam. She continued her PhD studies and graduated cum laude in 1991 from Utrecht University's department of pediatric neurology, while also collaborating with the department of neuroradialogy of VU University Amsterdam.

== Career and research ==
In 1999, she became professor of pediatric neurology at VU University Amsterdam.

Van der Knaap's research focuses on white matter disorders. In the 1980s she started working with Magnetic resonance imaging (MRI), of which she stated it is pivotal for her work. In the field, she developed a computer-guided recognition system for known diseases. She discovered five diseases, one of which was named after her, although she did not find that necessary. She was involved with the discovery of vanishing white matter in the 1990s, in 2014 she said that a treatment based on stem cell transplantation is coming closer.

In 2008, she was one of four winners of the Dutch Spinoza Prize and received a 1,5 million euro grant. Van der Knaap stated to spend the money on developing treatment for white matter disorders. With the money she founded a stem cell laboratory at the VU University Amsterdam.

Van der Knaap became a member of the Royal Netherlands Academy of Arts and Sciences in 2010.
