= Hypertensive leukoencephalopathy =

- Specialty: Neurology

Hypertensive leukoencephalopathy refers to a degeneration of the white matter of the brain following a sudden increase in blood pressure.

== Signs and symptoms ==
Symptoms include sudden increase in blood pressure, acute confusional state, headaches, vomiting, and seizure. Retinal hemorrhages and hard exudates may be present on funduscopic exam. Hypertensive leukoencephalopathy may have concurrent cardiac ischemia and hematuria.

== Diagnosis ==
MRI shows hyperintensities on T2 weighted imaging, localized usually to the parietal and occipital regions.

== Treatment ==
Antihypertensives may be an effective treatment.

== See also ==
- Leukoencephalopathy
- Leukodystrophy
