= Hypomyelination with brainstem and spinal cord involvement and leg spasticity =

Rare genetic disorder

- Other names: Aspartyl-tRNA synthetase deficiency, HBSL
- HBSL is inherited in Autosomal recessive fashion.
- Symptoms: Regression of the motor milestones, epilepsy, intellectual disability, ataxia, nystagmus, and spasticity.
- Causes: Mutations in a gene DARS1
- Deaths: 1

Hypomyelination with brainstem and spinal cord involvement and leg spasticity (HBSL) is a rare autosomal recessive disorder which is caused by a mutation in a gene DARS1. HBSL usually begins at the age of 3-36 months, and the main signs of this disorder are: Regression of the motor milestones, epilepsy, intellectual disability, ataxia, nystagmus, and spasticity.

Approximately 19 cases had been reported as of 2023.

== Symptoms ==
In case of infantile-onset HBSL, patients experience regression of the motor development/developmental delay, also some patients experience tethered cord syndrome, triangular head shape, Chiari malformation, and vertebral anomalies. In case of older-onset HBSL, it begins with spasticity.

Almost all of the patients experience hypertonia, positive Babinski sign, and hyper-reflexia, also nystagmus is a common finding for this disorder. In much rarer cases patients also have diminished muscle tone of the trunk musculature, seizures, intellectual disability, and headaches. Upper limbs are also involved in a severe forms of HBSL.

Patients with HBSL have either diplegic gait or in-toeing gait.

== Diagnosis ==
HBSL doesn't have exact MRI criteria, but some of the features can be observed in MRI, such as:

- Abnormalities of Posterior Limb of Internal Capsule
- Corpus callosum hyperintentisty on MRI, also some of the patients have thin corpus callosum

Also, most of the patients had this signs:

- Abnormalities of the superior and inferior cerebellar peduncles
- Abnormalities of the pyramidal tracts in the medulla and spinal cord
- Abnormalities of the dorsal columns of the spinal cord

== Cause ==
HBSL is caused by a mutation in a gene DARS1, which encodes protein aspartyl-tRNA synthetase, cytoplasmic.

== Pathophysiology ==
According to studies, the hypomorphic variant of DARS1 causes decreased levels of the myelin proteins (such as PLP1, MBP, and CNP), which might be the cause of the symptoms. Also, one of mutations (D367Y to be exact) slightly increases activity of enzyme, which reduces specificity for the aspartate's tRNA, and enzyme mischarges other amino acid's tRNA with aspartate. Incorrectly charged tRNA causes accumulation of misfolded proteins, which is harmful for the cell.

== Treatment ==
HBSL doesn't have a cure, although it can be managed (by using steroids, immunoglobulins, physiotherapy etc).

== Prognosis ==
Because of the rarity of HBSL, exact prognosis is unknown, although if HBSL begins early, then prognosis would be worse.

== History ==
HBSL was first described by Taft and colleagues in 2013.

== Culture ==
MacPac Foundation is a non-profit organisation which is dedicated to raise awareness about HBSL, also raising funds for the scientist and affected families.
