= Hyperintensity =

High intensity on MRI brain scans

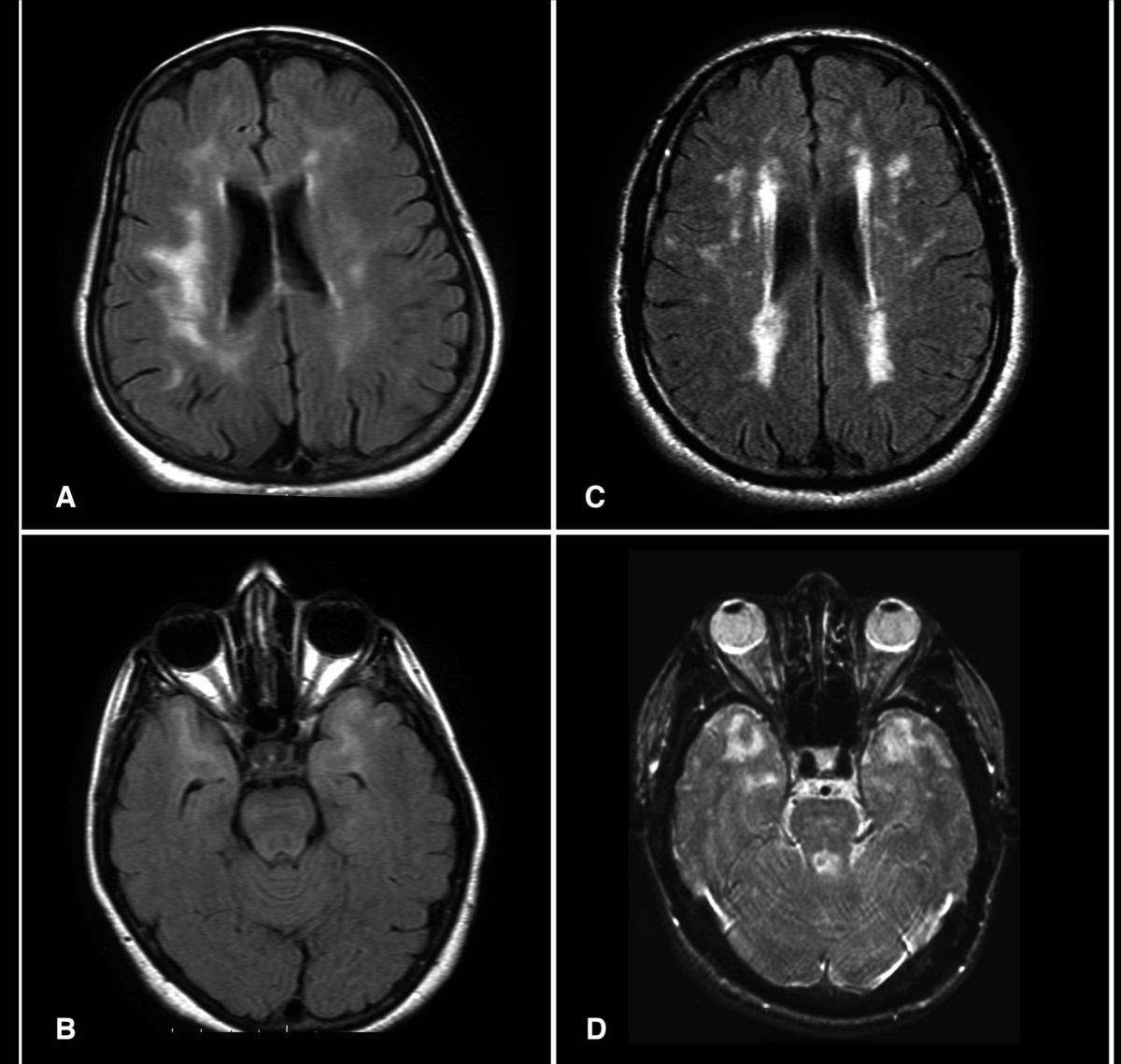
MRI scans showing hyperintensities

A hyperintensity or T2 hyperintensity is an area of high intensity on types of magnetic resonance imaging (MRI) scans of the brain of a human or of another mammal that reflect lesions produced largely by demyelination and axonal loss. These small regions of high intensity are observed on T2-weighted MRI images (typically created using 3D FLAIR) within cerebral white matter (white matter lesions, white matter hyperintensities or WMH) or subcortical gray matter (gray matter hyperintensities or GMH). The volume and frequency is strongly associated with increasing age. They are also seen in a number of neurological disorders and psychiatric illnesses. For example, deep white matter hyperintensities are 2.5 to 3 times more likely to occur in bipolar disorder and major depressive disorder than control subjects. WMH volume, calculated as a potential diagnostic measure, has been shown to correlate to certain cognitive factors. Hyperintensities appear as "bright signals" (bright areas) on an MRI image and the term "bright signal" is occasionally used as a synonym for a hyperintensity.

Hyperintensities are commonly divided into 3 types depending on the region of the brain where they are found. Deep white matter hyperintensities occur deep within white matter, periventricular white matter hyperintensities occur adjacent to the lateral ventricles and subcortical hyperintensities occur in the basal ganglia.

Hyperintensities are often seen in auto immune diseases that have effects on the brain.

Postmortem studies combined with MRI suggest that hyperintensities are dilated perivascular spaces, or demyelination caused by reduced local blood flow.

== Causes ==
White matter hyperintensities can be caused by a variety of factors including ischemia, micro-hemorrhages, gliosis, damage to small blood vessel walls, breaches of the barrier between the cerebrospinal fluid and the brain, or loss and deformation of the myelin sheath. People with a peripheral diastolic blood pressure (ie. as measured in a peripheral artery, most commonly the brachial artery) that is consistently below 60 mmHg may be at higher risk of white matter lesions due to a decrease in cerebral perfusion (blood flow). Over half of cerebral perfusion occurs during diastole.

== Cognitive effects ==
In most elderly people, presence of severe WMH and medial temporal lobe atrophy (MTA) was linked with an increase in frequency of mild cognitive deficits. Studies suggest that a combination of MTA and severe WMH showed more than a fourfold increase in the frequency of mild cognitive deficits. Severe WMH is consistently shown to be associated with gait disorders, impaired balance and cognitive disturbances. Certain features of gait pattern associated with WMH are: slight widening of the base, slowing and shortening of stride length and turning en bloc. Speed of cognitive processes and frontal skills may also be impaired in people with WMH. Pathological signs of oligodendritic apoptosis and damage to axonal projections have been evident. Sufficient damage to the axons that course through WMH can cause adequate interference with normal neuronal functions.

It is also thought that WMH have a negative impact on cognition in people with Alzheimer's disease. In people with Alzheimer's, higher WMH are associated with higher amyloid beta deposits, possibly associated with small vessel disease and reduced amyloid beta clearance.

== See also ==
- Leukoaraiosis
- Hypertensive leukoencephalopathy
- Subcortical ischemic depression
- Virchow-Robin spaces
