= Bhim Singhal =

Indian neurologist

Bhim Sen Singhal
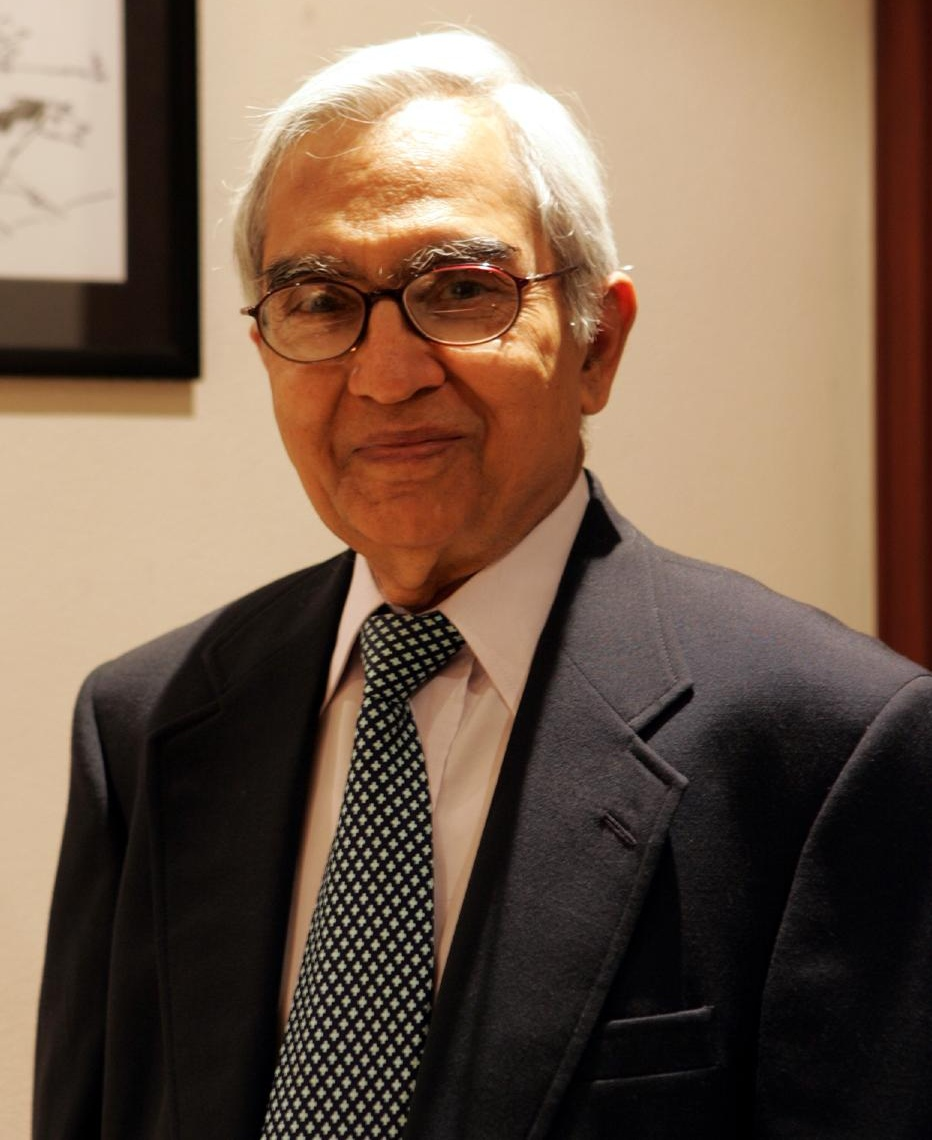
- Born: 23 January 1933 (age 93); Mount Abu, Rajasthan, India
- Occupation: Neurologist
- Spouse: Dr. Asha Singhal
- Children: Dr. Aneesh Singhal, Dr. Seema Singhal

Bhim Sen Singhal (also known as B. S. Singhal) is the director of neurology at Bombay Hospital Institute of Medical Sciences in Mumbai, India.

== Early life and education ==
Singhal was born at Mount Abu on 23 January 1933. After schooling at Mount Abu and premedical studies at Maharaja's College in Jaipur, he studied medicine at the Grant Medical College and Sir J. J. Group of Hospitals in Mumbai. He obtained his MBBS degree in 1956 and MD in 1959. After his initial training in Neurology in Mumbai, he went abroad for further training at the UCL Institute of Neurology, London. During his training in the United Kingdom, he obtained his MRCP (Edinburgh) in 1960 and MRCP (London) in 1961. He was made a Fellow of the Royal College of Edinburgh in 1973 and Fellow of the Royal College of London in 1985.

== Professional life ==
On his return to India in 1962, Singhal joined the departments of neurology at Grant Medical College and Sir J. J. Group of Hospitals and at Bombay Hospital Institute of Medical Sciences. He retired as professor and head of neurology from Grant Medical College in 1991. Currently, he is director of neurology at Bombay Hospital.

Over the course of his professional life, Singhal has helped to train over 200 neurologists who are now providing care across India. He has published over 200 scientific papers in both national and international books and journals. He is known for his interest and work in multiple sclerosis and myasthenia gravis. With international collaboration and help from his colleagues, he discovered the entity of Megalencephalic Leukodystrophy with a specific gene defect prevalent in the Agarwal community.

Throughout his entire career, Singhal has been actively promoting the cause of neurology. He was president of the Neurological Society of India (1986), president of the Indian Epilepsy Association (2000–2002), member of the World Health Organization working group for multiple sclerosis and Parkinson's disease, regional director for the World Federation of Neurology (2005–2009), and chairperson of the Asian Section of The Movement Disorder Society (2009–2010). In order to update neurologists on recent advances in neurology, Singhal created the Neurology Foundation in 1996, and holds 'Neurology Update' meetings every alternate year.

Singhal established the Parkinson's Disease and Movement Disorder Society in 2001 which now has 19 support groups in Mumbai and also in Nasik, Goa, Pune, Jalgaon, Hyderabad, Surat, Jodhpur, and Cochin, where he now serves as honorary secretary. This has been acknowledged as a model for developing countries by organizations like the World Parkinson's Congress and the World Federation of Neurology.

Singhal has been honored nationally and internationally by having two orations instituted in his name. The first 'Singhal Oration' is delivered every alternate year at the annual meeting of the Indian Academy of Neurology. The second 'Singhal Oration' is delivered at the international conference of the World Federation of Neurology. In 2022, the Government of India recognized Singhal's years of service with the prestigious Padma Shri award.

== Awards ==
Singhal has received the following awards for his contributions to the field of neurology.

- 1983 - Karmayogi Puraskar Award
- 1983 - Fellowship of the National Academy of Medical Sciences,
- 1993 - Rajasthan Ratna Award
- 1999 - Dr. B. C. Roy National Award
- 2004 - Priyadarshini Academy National Award
- 2005 - Wockhardt Award
- 2006 - Lifetime Achievement Award of Madras Neuro Trust.
- 2009 - Dhanvantari Award
- 2013 - Rameshwardas Birla National Award
- 2022 - Padma Shri National Award for services in the field of Medicine
