= HEPACAM =

Protein-coding gene in the species Homo sapiens

Identifiers
- Aliases: HEPACAM, GlialCAM, MLC2A, MLC2B, hepatic and glial cell adhesion molecule, HEPACAM1, HEPN1
- External IDs: OMIM: 611642; MGI: 1920177; GeneCards: HEPACAM

Gene location (Human)
Chr.	Chromosome 11 (human)
Band	11q24.2	Start	124,919,205 bp
Band	11q24.2	End	124,936,412 bp

Gene location (Mouse)
Chr.	Chromosome 9 (mouse)
Band	9|9 A4	Start	37,278,647 bp
Band	9|9 A4	End	37,297,871 bp
RNA expression pattern
Bgee	Human / Mouse (ortholog); Top expressed in: external globus pallidus; pars reticulata; internal globus pallidus; entorhinal cortex; caudate nucleus; pars compacta; lateral nuclear group of thalamus; postcentral gyrus; amygdala; primary visual cortex / Top expressed in: lumbar subsegment of spinal cord; deep cerebellar nuclei; cerebellar cortex; suprachiasmatic nucleus; globus pallidus; primary visual cortex; central gray substance of midbrain; otolith organ; lateral geniculate nucleus; utricle; More reference expression data
BioGPS	n/a
Orthologs
Databases	NCBI: entry; OMA: entry
Species	Human	Mouse
Entrez	220296	72927
Ensembl	ENSG00000165478	ENSMUSG00000046240
UniProt	Q14CZ8	Q640R3
RefSeq (mRNA)	NM_152722	NM_175189
RefSeq (protein)	NP_689935	NP_780398
Location (UCSC)	Chr 11: 124.92 – 124.94 Mb	Chr 9: 37.28 – 37.3 Mb
PubMed search
- Wikidata
View/Edit Human	View/Edit Mouse

Gene HEPACAM*, named based on its original site of identification - hepatocytes and the nature of its protein product - a cell adhesion molecule (CAM), was first discovered and characterised by Shali Shen (MD, PhD) in human liver. The gene encodes a protein of 416 amino acids, designated as hepaCAM**, which is a new member of the immunoglobulin superfamily of cell adhesion molecules (IgSF CAM). The main biological functions of hepaCAM include a) modulating cell-matrix adhesion and migration, and b) inhibiting cancer cell growth.

(Note: *HEPACAM, gene name; **hepaCAM, protein name)

== Discovery ==
Through differential screening of gene expression, over 200 genes were found to be either up- or down-regulated in a hepatocellular carcinoma patient. These genes were subsequently evaluated against a panel of human HCC specimens, leading to the identification of a novel gene HEPN1. Based on the sequence of HEPN1, the new gene HEPACAM was then isolated and characterised.

== Characteristics and functions ==
Structurally, hepaCAM is a glycoprotein containing an extracellular domain with 2 Ig-like loops, a transmembrane region and a cytoplasmic domain. Matched to chromosome 11q24, gene HEPACAM is ubiquitously expressed in normal human tissues, with particularly high expression levels in the central nervous system (CNS), and is frequently suppressed in a variety of tumour types. Functionally, hepaCAM is involved in cell-extracellular matrix interactions and growth control of cancer cells, and is able to induce differentiation of glioblastoma cells. In cell signaling, hepaCAM directly interacts with F-actin and caveolin 1, and is capable of inducing senescence-like growth arrest via a p53/p21-dependent pathway. Moreover, hepaCAM is proteolytically cleaved near the transmembrane region. These findings indicate that the new Ig-like cell adhesion molecule hepaCAM is also a tumour suppressor.

Mutations in the human HEPACAM gene are linked to forms of leukodystrophy, a group of inherited disorders characterized by degeneration of brain white matter. The protein produced from the HEPACAM gene was found to interact with the gene products of MLC1 and CLCN2, two other human genes linked to leukodystrophies.

== Other names ==
1. glialCAM, which was cloned from a human brain cDNA library in 2008 and found to be identical to hepaCAM; and
2. HEPACAM1, when HEPACAM2 emerged in 2010.

== About HEPACAM 2 ==
Metastatic canine mammary carcinoma and their metastases are characterized by decreased HEPACAM2 but unchanged HEPACAM2 expression levels when compared to normal glands.
