= Aspartate–tRNA ligase, mitochondrial =

Mitochondrial enzyme

DARS2

Identifiers
- Aliases: DARS2, ASPRS, LBSL, MT-ASPRS, aspartyl-tRNA synthetase 2, mitochondrial, mtAspRS
- External IDs: OMIM: 610956; MGI: 2442510; GeneCards: DARS2
Available structures
PDB	Ortholog search: PDBe RCSB
PDB	List of PDB id codes 4AH6
Enzyme activity
EC #	BRENDA	ExPASy	KEGG	MetaCyc
6.1.1.12	↗	↗	↗	↗

Gene location (Human)
Chr.	Chromosome 1 (human)
Band	1q25.1	Start	173,824,653 bp
Band	1q25.1	End	173,858,808 bp

Gene location (Mouse)
Chr.	Chromosome 1 (mouse)
Band	1|1 H2.1	Start	160,868,171 bp
Band	1|1 H2.1	End	160,898,228 bp
RNA expression pattern
Bgee	Human / Mouse (ortholog); Top expressed in: gonad; rectum; right adrenal gland; ventricular zone; mucosa of transverse colon; right adrenal cortex; islet of Langerhans; testicle; left adrenal gland; left adrenal cortex / Top expressed in: epiblast; ventricular zone; right kidney; primitive streak; proximal tubule; tail of embryo; blastocyst; embryo; Paneth cell; hand; More reference expression data
BioGPS	n/a
Gene ontology
Molecular function	aminoacyl-tRNA ligase activity; nucleotide binding; tRNA binding; ligase activity; aspartate-tRNA(Asn) ligase activity; protein binding; ATP binding; protein homodimerization activity; nucleic acid binding; aspartate-tRNA ligase activity
Cellular component	cytoplasm; mitochondrial matrix; mitochondrion; nucleus
Biological process	tRNA aminoacylation; tRNA aminoacylation for protein translation; protein biosynthesis; mitochondrial asparaginyl-tRNA aminoacylation
Sources:Amigo / QuickGO
Orthologs
Databases	NCBI: entry; OMA: entry
Species	Human	Mouse
Entrez	55157	226539
Ensembl	ENSG00000117593	ENSMUSG00000026709
UniProt	Q6PI48	Q8BIP0
RefSeq (mRNA)	NM_018122; NM_001365212; NM_001365213	NM_172644
RefSeq (protein)	NP_060592; NP_001352141; NP_001352142; NP_060592.2	NP_766232
Location (UCSC)	Chr 1: 173.82 – 173.86 Mb	Chr 1: 160.87 – 160.9 Mb
PubMed search
- Wikidata
View/Edit Human	View/Edit Mouse

Aspartate–tRNA ligase, mitochondrial is an enzyme that in humans is encoded by the gene DARS2. This protein is located in mitochondria where it attaches the amino acid aspartate to its matching transfer RNA, tRNA^{Asp}, as part of RNA-to-protein translation.

== Gene ==
The DARS2 gene is located on the long arm (q) of chromosome 1 on position 25.1, from base pair from base pair 173,821,286 to base pair 173,861,933.

== Clinical significance ==
Leukoencephalopathy with brainstem and spinal cord involvement and lactate elevation (LBSL) is a rare genetic disorder caused by mutations in DARS2 which causes brain and spinal cord damage. This disorder is characterized by slowly progressive cerebellar ataxia and spasticity with dorsal column dysfunction (decreased position and vibration sense) in most individuals.

== See also ==
- Aspartate–tRNA ligase, cytoplasmic
