= HEPN1 =

Protein-coding gene in the species Homo sapiens

Identifiers
- Aliases: HEPN1, hepatocellular carcinoma, down-regulated 1
- External IDs: OMIM: 611641; HomoloGene: 134601; GeneCards: HEPN1; OMA:HEPN1 - orthologs

Gene location (Human)
Chr.	Chromosome 11 (human)
Band	11q24.2	Start	124,919,244 bp
Band	11q24.2	End	124,920,677 bp
RNA expression pattern
Bgee	Human / Mouse (ortholog); Top expressed in: testicle; amygdala; putamen; C1 segment; substantia nigra; caudate nucleus; hippocampus proper; nucleus accumbens; right frontal lobe; hypothalamus / n/a; More reference expression data
BioGPS	n/a
Orthologs
Species	Human	Mouse
Entrez	641654	n/a
Ensembl	ENSG00000221932	n/a
UniProt	Q6WQI6	n/a
RefSeq (mRNA)	NM_001037558	n/a
RefSeq (protein)	NP_001032647	n/a
Location (UCSC)	Chr 11: 124.92 – 124.92 Mb	n/a
PubMed search		n/a
- Wikidata
View/Edit Human

Hepatocellular carcinoma, down-regulated 1 is a protein that in humans is encoded by the HEPN1 gene.

== Function ==
This gene is expressed in the liver, and encodes a short peptide that is localized predominantly to the cytoplasm. Transient transfection studies showed that expression of this gene significantly inhibited cell growth, and it may have a role in apoptosis. Expression of this gene is downregulated or lost in hepatocellular carcinomas (HCC), suggesting that loss of this gene is involved in carcinogenesis of hepatocytes. Also to note is that this gene maps to the 3'-noncoding region of the HEPACAM gene (GeneID:220296) on the antisense strand.
