= MLC1 =

Protein-coding gene in the species Homo sapiens

Identifiers
- Aliases: MLC1, LVM, MLC, VL, megalencephalic leukoencephalopathy with subcortical cysts 1, modulator of VRAC current 1
- External IDs: OMIM: 605908; MGI: 2157910; GeneCards: MLC1

Gene location (Human)
Chr.	Chromosome 22 (human)
Band	22q13.33	Start	50,059,391 bp
Band	22q13.33	End	50,085,902 bp

Gene location (Mouse)
Chr.	Chromosome 15 (mouse)
Band	15|15 E3	Start	88,840,087 bp
Band	15|15 E3	End	88,863,210 bp
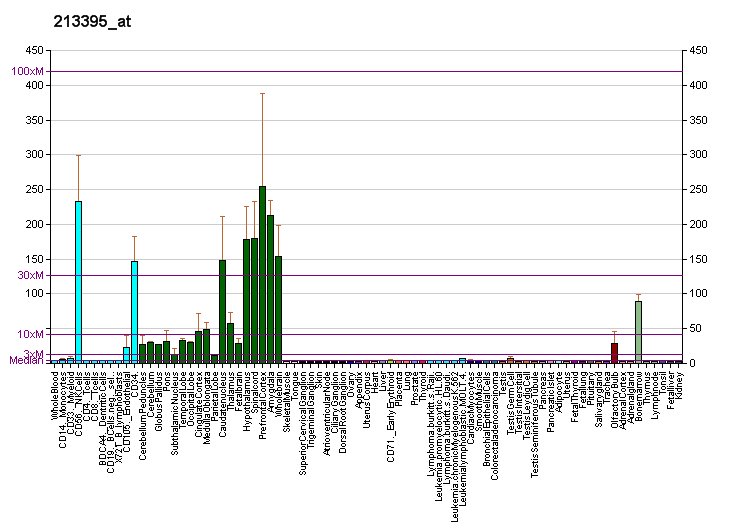
RNA expression pattern
Bgee	Human / Mouse (ortholog); Top expressed in: nucleus accumbens; ventricular zone; caudate nucleus; amygdala; putamen; right frontal lobe; paraflocculus of cerebellum; Brodmann area 9; anterior cingulate cortex; hypothalamus / Top expressed in: optic nerve; arcuate nucleus; median eminence; deep cerebellar nuclei; globus pallidus; paraventricular nucleus of hypothalamus; dentate gyrus of hippocampal formation granule cell; spermatocyte; mammillary body; nucleus of stria terminalis; More reference expression data
BioGPS	More reference expression data
Gene ontology
Molecular function	protein binding; protein-containing complex binding
Cellular component	cytoplasm; integral component of membrane; recycling endosome; endosome; membrane; cell-cell junction; plasma membrane; basolateral plasma membrane; early endosome; apical plasma membrane; endoplasmic reticulum; perinuclear region of cytoplasm; caveola; membrane raft; lysosome; cytoplasmic vesicle; clathrin-coated vesicle
Biological process	caveolin-mediated endocytosis; positive regulation of intracellular transport; ion transport; cellular response to cholesterol; regulation of response to osmotic stress; protein complex oligomerization; protein transport; vesicle-mediated transport
Sources:Amigo / QuickGO
Orthologs
Databases	NCBI: entry; OMA: entry
Species	Human	Mouse
Entrez	23209	170790
Ensembl	ENSG00000100427	ENSMUSG00000035805
UniProt	Q15049	Q8VHK5
RefSeq (mRNA)	NM_015166; NM_139202	NM_133241; NM_001364855
RefSeq (protein)	NP_055981; NP_631941; NP_001363401; NP_001363402; NP_001363403 NP_001363404; NP_001363405; NP_001363406; NP_001363407; NP_001363408; NP_001363409; NP_001363410; NP_001363411; NP_001363412; NP_001363413	NP_573504; NP_001351784
Location (UCSC)	Chr 22: 50.06 – 50.09 Mb	Chr 15: 88.84 – 88.86 Mb
PubMed search
- Wikidata
View/Edit Human	View/Edit Mouse

Membrane protein MLC1 (also called WKL1) is a protein that in humans is encoded by the MLC1 gene.

MLC1 is one of four major genes associated with megalencephalic leukoencephalopathy with subcortical cysts (MLC). The other three are GPRC5B, HEPACAM, and AQP4.

== Function ==
The function of this gene product is not known; however, homology to other proteins suggests that it may be an integral membrane transport protein. Mutations in this gene have been associated with megalencephalic leukoencephalopathy with subcortical cysts, an autosomal recessive neurological disorder.

The MLC1 protein contains six putative transmembrane domains (S1–S6) and a pore region (P) between S5 and S6. Furthermore, MLC1 has highest homology with the KCNA1 shaker-related voltage-gated potassium channel (K_{v}1.1). This analysis suggests that MLC1 may be a cation channel.
