= Leukoencephalopathy with brainstem and spinal cord involvement and lactate elevation =

Leukoencephalopathy with Brainstem and Spinal Cord Involvement and Lactate Elevation
- LBSL is inherited in an autosomal recessive fashion
- Specialty: Neurology
- Symptoms: Progressive cerebellar ataxia
- Usual onset: Adolescence
- Causes: Mutation in a gene DARS2
- Frequency: 1/1 000 000

Leukoencephalopathy with Brainstem and Spinal Cord Involvement and Lactate Elevation (LBSL) is a rare, hereditary neurodegenerative disease. The disease is characterized by slowly progressive cerebellar ataxia and spasticity with dorsal column dysfunction (decreased position and vibration sense) in most individuals. While tendon reflexes are retained, neurological dysfunction occurs in the arms and the legs with the latter being more affected. Onset of the disease arises in early childhood while some cases may arise in adulthood.

200 cases of this disorder have been reported (As of 2023).

== Signs and symptoms ==
Most frequently, people with LBSL have anomalies of the dorsal columns. They also frequently exhibit Cerebellar abnormality, abnormal speech, positive babinski sign, clumsiness with abnomral gait, weakness of distal muscles, dysmyelinating leukodystrophy, loss of ability to walk, progressive ataxia, progressive spasticity with spastic ataxia, pyramidal tract dysfunction. Occasionally, patients may also experience decreased reflexes, increased level of lactate in CSF and in blood, cognitive decline, axonal peripheral neuropathy. In very rare cases, they might have absence of the speech, cerebellum and cerebral atrophy, double vision, flexion contractures of joints, deafness, hypoplasia of corpus callosum, diminished muscle tone, intellectual disability, nystagmus, optic nerve atrophy, slow eye movements, drooping upper eyelid, seizures.

== Diagnosis ==
There is the MRI criteria for LBSL, and major criteria of signal anomalies includes:

- Cerebral white matter (relative sparing of the subcortical white matter)
- Dorsal columns and lateral corticospinal tracts of the spinal cord
- Pyramids at the level of the medulla oblongata or decussatio of the medial lemniscus or both

Minor criteria of signal anomalies includes:

- Splenium of the corpus callosum
- Posterior limb of the internal capsule
- Superior and inferior cerebellar peduncles
- Intraparenchymal part of the trigeminal nerve
- Mesencephalic trigeminal tracts
- Anterior spinocerebellar tracts in the medulla oblongata
- Cerebellar white matter

== Cause ==
LBSL is caused by an abnormal variant on in the DARS2 gene. 95% of cases are caused by compound heterozygous variants (compound heterozygous means two different mutated alleles that present at particular gene locus).

One of the widespread variant is the splice site variant at the end 3'end of intron 2, because of the leaky nature of this splice variant, it ensures residual protein function.

== Pathophysiology ==
DARS2 is a mitochrondrial enzyme, which attaches aspartate to its matching tRNA in mitochondria.

In this disorder, DARS2 function is impaired, which decreases translation of MT-ND5 and COXII, consequently it impairs oxidative phosphorylation. This impairement leads to activation of the integrated stress response.

== Treatment ==
This disease doesn't have a cure, but symptoms can be managed. Treatment includes physiotherapy, anti-seizure medications, and speech therapy.

== Prognosis ==
Most of the time, life expectancy of this disorder is normal, although most of the patients end up using a wheelchair. Early onset LBSL has much more severe symptoms and it can end fatally.

== History ==
LBSL was first described in 8 patients by van der Knaap and colleagues in 2003.
