= EIF2B2 =

Protein-coding gene in the species Homo sapiens

Identifiers
- Aliases: EIF2B2, EIF-2Bbeta, EIF2B, eukaryotic translation initiation factor 2B subunit beta, EIF2Bbeta
- External IDs: OMIM: 606454; MGI: 2145118; HomoloGene: 6507; GeneCards: EIF2B2; OMA:EIF2B2 - orthologs

Gene location (Human)
Chr.	Chromosome 14 (human)
Band	14q24.3	Start	75,002,921 bp
Band	14q24.3	End	75,012,366 bp

Gene location (Mouse)
Chr.	Chromosome 12 (mouse)
Band	12|12 D1	Start	85,266,255 bp
Band	12|12 D1	End	85,273,402 bp
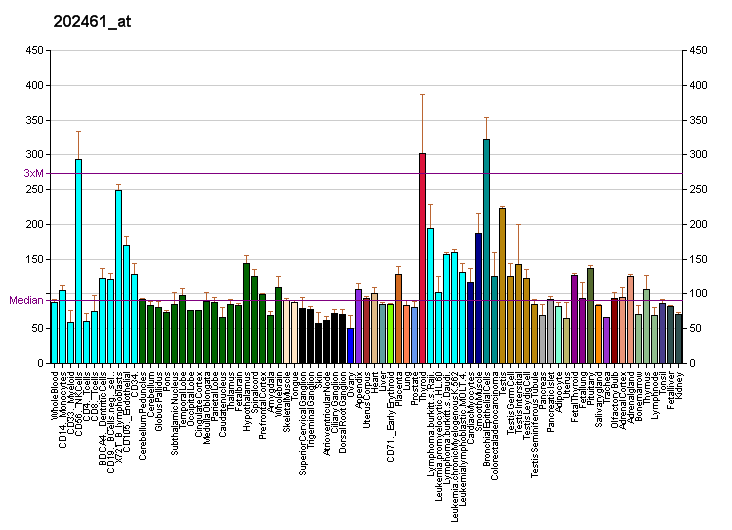
RNA expression pattern
Bgee	Human / Mouse (ortholog); Top expressed in: left lobe of thyroid gland; right lobe of thyroid gland; right adrenal cortex; gastrocnemius muscle; left adrenal gland; muscle of thigh; left adrenal cortex; popliteal artery; tibial arteries; mucosa of transverse colon / Top expressed in: condyle; fossa; renal corpuscle; internal carotid artery; external carotid artery; endocardial cushion; saccule; yolk sac; substantia nigra; medullary collecting duct; More reference expression data
BioGPS	More reference expression data
Gene ontology
Molecular function	translation initiation factor activity; guanyl-nucleotide exchange factor activity; GTP binding; protein binding; ATP binding
Cellular component	cytoplasm; cytosol; eukaryotic translation initiation factor 2B complex
Biological process	response to peptide hormone; response to heat; response to glucose; central nervous system development; cell metabolism; ovarian follicle development; myelination; oligodendrocyte development; regulation of translational initiation; protein biosynthesis; translational initiation; T cell receptor signaling pathway
Sources:Amigo / QuickGO
Orthologs
Species	Human	Mouse
Entrez	8892	217715
Ensembl	ENSG00000119718	ENSMUSG00000004788
UniProt	P49770	Q99LD9
RefSeq (mRNA)	NM_014239	NM_145445
RefSeq (protein)	NP_055054	NP_663420
Location (UCSC)	Chr 14: 75 – 75.01 Mb	Chr 12: 85.27 – 85.27 Mb
PubMed search
- Wikidata
View/Edit Human	View/Edit Mouse

Translation initiation factor eIF-2B subunit beta is a protein that in humans is encoded by the EIF2B2 gene.

== Function ==
Eukaryotic initiation factor-2B (EIF2B) is a GTP exchange protein essential for protein synthesis. It consists of alpha (EIF2B1; MIM 606686), beta (EIF2B2), gamma (EIF2B3; MIM 606273), delta (EIF2B4; MIM 606687), and epsilon (EIF2B5; MIM 603945) subunits. EIF2B activates its EIF2 (see MIM 603907) substrate by exchanging EIF2-bound GDP for GTP.

== Interactions ==
EIF2B2 has been shown to interact with EIF2B5 and NCK1.
