= EIF2B4 =

Protein-coding gene in the species Homo sapiens

Identifiers
- Aliases: EIF2B4, EIF-2B, EIF2B, EIF2Bdelta, eukaryotic translation initiation factor 2B subunit delta
- External IDs: OMIM: 606687; MGI: 95300; HomoloGene: 5976; GeneCards: EIF2B4; OMA:EIF2B4 - orthologs

Gene location (Human)
Chr.	Chromosome 2 (human)
Band	2p23.3	Start	27,364,352 bp
Band	2p23.3	End	27,370,338 bp

Gene location (Mouse)
Chr.	Chromosome 5 (mouse)
Band	5|5 B1	Start	31,344,902 bp
Band	5|5 B1	End	31,350,774 bp
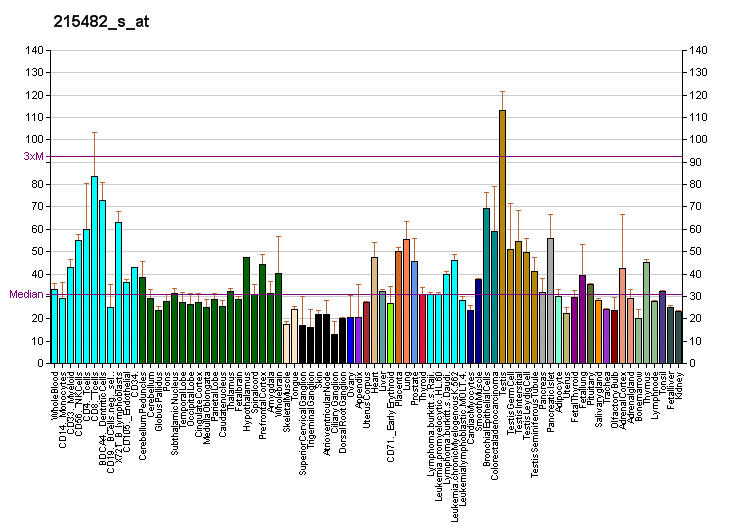

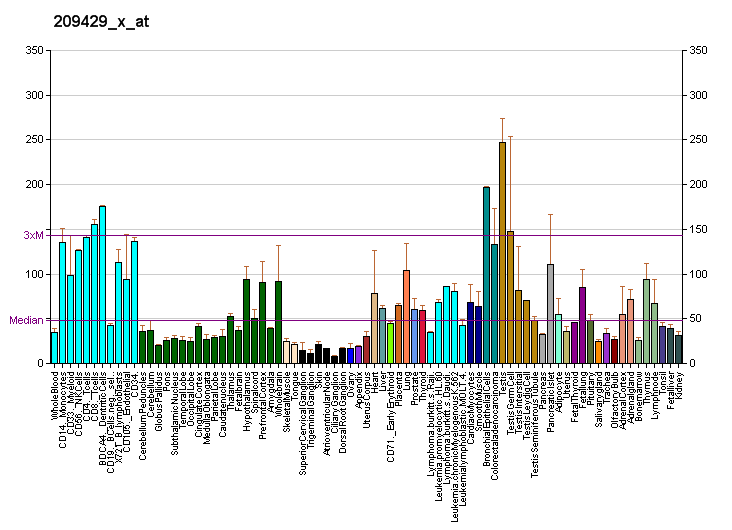
RNA expression pattern
Bgee	Human / Mouse (ortholog); Top expressed in: body of pancreas; left testis; right testis; muscle layer of sigmoid colon; sural nerve; gingival epithelium; anterior pituitary; skin of abdomen; mucosa of transverse colon; skin of leg / Top expressed in: primitive streak; temporal muscle; primary oocyte; digastric muscle; hair follicle; sternocleidomastoid muscle; triceps brachii muscle; muscle of thigh; vastus lateralis muscle; motor neuron; More reference expression data
BioGPS	More reference expression data
Gene ontology
Molecular function	guanyl-nucleotide exchange factor activity; protein binding; translation initiation factor binding; translation initiation factor activity
Cellular component	cytoplasm; cytosol; eukaryotic translation initiation factor 2B complex
Biological process	response to peptide hormone; response to heat; response to glucose; cell metabolism; ovarian follicle development; myelination; oligodendrocyte development; regulation of translation; translational initiation; protein biosynthesis; T cell receptor signaling pathway
Sources:Amigo / QuickGO
Orthologs
Species	Human	Mouse
Entrez	8890	13667
Ensembl	ENSG00000115211	ENSMUSG00000029145
UniProt	Q9UI10	Q61749
RefSeq (mRNA)	NM_001034116; NM_015636; NM_172195; NM_001318965; NM_001318966 NM_001318967; NM_001318968; NM_001318969	NM_001127355; NM_001127356; NM_010122
RefSeq (protein)	NP_001029288; NP_001305894; NP_001305895; NP_001305896; NP_001305897 NP_001305898; NP_056451; NP_751945; NP_001305896.1	NP_001120827; NP_001120828; NP_034252
Location (UCSC)	Chr 2: 27.36 – 27.37 Mb	Chr 5: 31.34 – 31.35 Mb
PubMed search
- Wikidata
View/Edit Human	View/Edit Mouse

Translation initiation factor eIF-2B subunit delta is a protein that in humans is encoded by the EIF2B4 gene.
