= EIF2B3 =

Protein-coding gene in humans

Identifiers
- Aliases: EIF2B3, EIF-2B, EIF2Bgamma, eukaryotic translation initiation factor 2B subunit gamma
- External IDs: OMIM: 606273; MGI: 1313286; GeneCards: EIF2B3

Gene location (Human)
Chr.	Chromosome 1 (human)
Band	1p34.1	Start	44,850,522 bp
Band	1p34.1	End	44,986,722 bp

Gene location (Mouse)
Chr.	Chromosome 4 (mouse)
Band	4|4 D1	Start	116,876,599 bp
Band	4|4 D1	End	116,944,503 bp
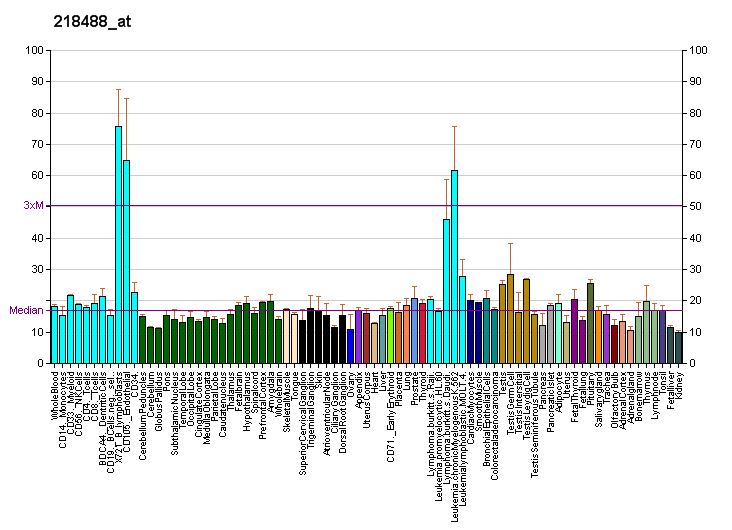
RNA expression pattern
Bgee	Human / Mouse (ortholog); Top expressed in: triceps brachii muscle; glutes; gastrocnemius muscle; muscle of thigh; Skeletal muscle tissue of biceps brachii; deltoid muscle; vastus lateralis muscle; islet of Langerhans; parotid gland; Skeletal muscle tissue of rectus abdominis / Top expressed in: morula; superior cervical ganglion; embryo; embryo; epiblast; autopod region; hand; foot; yolk sac; blastocyst; More reference expression data
BioGPS	More reference expression data
Gene ontology
Molecular function	nucleotidyltransferase activity; translation factor activity, RNA binding; protein binding; translation initiation factor activity; guanyl-nucleotide exchange factor activity
Cellular component	cytoplasm; cytosol; eukaryotic translation initiation factor 2B complex
Biological process	oligodendrocyte development; response to peptide hormone; response to heat; response to glucose; biosynthetic process; hippocampus development; protein biosynthesis; translational initiation; T cell receptor signaling pathway
Sources:Amigo / QuickGO
Orthologs
Databases	NCBI: entry; OMA: entry
Species	Human	Mouse
Entrez	8891	108067
Ensembl	ENSG00000070785	ENSMUSG00000028683
UniProt	Q9NR50	n/a
RefSeq (mRNA)	NM_001166588; NM_001261418; NM_020365	NM_001111277; NM_175135; NM_001355225
RefSeq (protein)	NP_001160060; NP_001248347; NP_065098	n/a
Location (UCSC)	Chr 1: 44.85 – 44.99 Mb	Chr 4: 116.88 – 116.94 Mb
PubMed search
- Wikidata
View/Edit Human	View/Edit Mouse

Translation initiation factor eIF-2B subunit gamma is a protein that in humans is encoded by the EIF2B3 gene.
