= EIF2B5 =

Protein-coding gene in humans

Available structures
PDB	Ortholog search: PDBe RCSB
PDB	List of PDB id codes 3JUI

Identifiers
- Aliases: EIF2B5, CACH, CLE, EIF-2B, EIF2Bepsilon, LVWM, eukaryotic translation initiation factor 2B subunit epsilon
- External IDs: OMIM: 603945; MGI: 2446176; HomoloGene: 2903; GeneCards: EIF2B5; OMA:EIF2B5 - orthologs

Gene location (Human)
Chr.	Chromosome 3 (human)
Band	3q27.1	Start	184,135,038 bp
Band	3q27.1	End	184,146,127 bp

Gene location (Mouse)
Chr.	Chromosome 16 (mouse)
Band	16|16 A3	Start	20,317,567 bp
Band	16|16 A3	End	20,328,073 bp
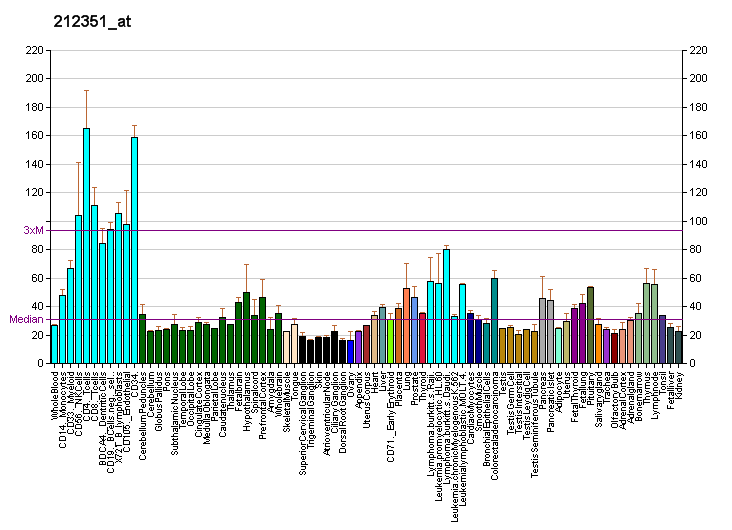
RNA expression pattern
Bgee	Human / Mouse (ortholog); Top expressed in: sural nerve; tendon of biceps brachii; gastrocnemius muscle; anterior pituitary; right hemisphere of cerebellum; middle temporal gyrus; minor salivary glands; mucosa of transverse colon; granulocyte; right lobe of thyroid gland / Top expressed in: spermatocyte; epiblast; morula; morula; lacrimal gland; muscle of thigh; spermatid; ventricular zone; tail of embryo; blastocyst; More reference expression data
BioGPS	More reference expression data
Gene ontology
Molecular function	translation initiation factor activity; guanyl-nucleotide exchange factor activity; protein binding; translation initiation factor binding
Cellular component	cytoplasm; eukaryotic translation initiation factor 2B complex; nucleus; cytosol
Biological process	astrocyte development; ageing; response to peptide hormone; response to heat; response to glucose; response to endoplasmic reticulum stress; astrocyte differentiation; ovarian follicle development; myelination; oligodendrocyte development; positive regulation of translational initiation; hippocampus development; translational initiation; response to lithium ion; protein biosynthesis; positive regulation of apoptotic process; positive regulation of translation; T cell receptor signaling pathway
Sources:Amigo / QuickGO
Orthologs
Species	Human	Mouse
Entrez	8893	224045
Ensembl	ENSG00000145191	ENSMUSG00000003235
UniProt	Q13144	Q8CHW4
RefSeq (mRNA)	NM_003907	NM_172265
RefSeq (protein)	NP_003898	NP_758469
Location (UCSC)	Chr 3: 184.14 – 184.15 Mb	Chr 16: 20.32 – 20.33 Mb
PubMed search
- Wikidata
View/Edit Human	View/Edit Mouse

Translation initiation factor eIF-2B subunit epsilon is a protein that in humans is encoded by the EIF2B5 gene.

== Interactions ==
EIF2B5 has been shown to interact with EIF2B2 and EIF2B1.
