= EIF2B1 =

Protein-coding gene in humans

Available structures
PDB	Ortholog search: PDBe RCSB
PDB	List of PDB id codes 3ECS

Identifiers
- Aliases: EIF2B1, EIF2B, EIF2BA, eukaryotic translation initiation factor 2B subunit alpha, EIF2Balpha
- External IDs: OMIM: 606686; MGI: 2384802; HomoloGene: 1080; GeneCards: EIF2B1; OMA:EIF2B1 - orthologs

Gene location (Human)
Chr.	Chromosome 12 (human)
Band	12q24.31	Start	123,620,406 bp
Band	12q24.31	End	123,633,766 bp

Gene location (Mouse)
Chr.	Chromosome 5 (mouse)
Band	5 F|5 63.67 cM	Start	124,708,276 bp
Band	5 F|5 63.67 cM	End	124,717,194 bp
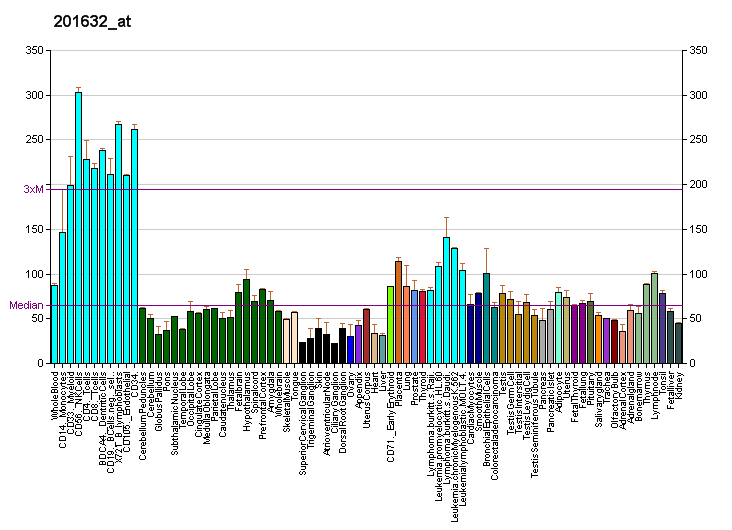
RNA expression pattern
Bgee	Human / Mouse (ortholog); Top expressed in: oocyte; secondary oocyte; monocyte; Achilles tendon; body of uterus; skin of hip; skin of thigh; right coronary artery; granulocyte; tibial arteries / Top expressed in: zygote; secondary oocyte; morula; morula; primary oocyte; yolk sac; primitive streak; embryo; epiblast; blastocyst; More reference expression data
BioGPS	More reference expression data
Gene ontology
Molecular function	translation initiation factor activity; guanyl-nucleotide exchange factor activity; protein binding; identical protein binding
Cellular component	cytoplasm; cytosol; membrane; plasma membrane; eukaryotic translation initiation factor 2B complex
Biological process	response to peptide hormone; response to heat; response to glucose; cell metabolism; oligodendrocyte development; protein biosynthesis; translational initiation; T cell receptor signaling pathway; regulation of translational initiation
Sources:Amigo / QuickGO
Orthologs
Species	Human	Mouse
Entrez	1967	209354
Ensembl	ENSG00000111361	ENSMUSG00000029388
UniProt	Q14232	Q99LC8
RefSeq (mRNA)	NM_001414	NM_145371
RefSeq (protein)	NP_001405	NP_663346
Location (UCSC)	Chr 12: 123.62 – 123.63 Mb	Chr 5: 124.71 – 124.72 Mb
PubMed search
- Wikidata
View/Edit Human	View/Edit Mouse

Translation initiation factor eIF-2B subunit alpha is a protein that in humans is encoded by the EIF2B1 gene.

== Interactions ==
EIF2B1 has been shown to interact with EIF2B5.
