= Gene Brown (professor) =

American professor of biochemistry at M.I.T. (1926–2017)

Gene M. Brown
- Born: 1926; Pioneer, Missouri
- Died: 4 August 2017 (aged 91)
- Scientific career
- Fields: Biochemistry
- Institutions: Massachusetts Institute of Technology

Gene Monte Brown (1926 – 4 August 2017) was a Professor Emeritus of Biochemistry at the Massachusetts Institute of Technology. He joined the department in 1954 and headed it from 1977 to 1985. Brown served as the dean of science at MIT from 1985 to 1991. He was committed to undergraduate education and taught the department's biochemistry course for over 50 years.

== Early life and education ==
Brown was born in Pioneer, Missouri, and raised in nearby Cassville until around age nine, when his family moved to Idaho. He was the first member of his family to attend high school and the only member of his graduating high school class to attend college. After a year as a college student in Idaho, he joined the Army Air Corps, where he was assigned to work in chemical warfare operations. His tasks included teaching safety lessons, which he later described as "whetting [his] teaching interest" for his later activities as an educator.

Brown used the GI Bill to attend Colorado A&M to finish his undergraduate degree in chemistry. He was encouraged by a biochemistry professor there to attend graduate school. Brown received his PhD from the University of Wisconsin in 1953 under the supervision of Esmond Snell, although Snell moved to the University of Texas partway through Brown's education. After defending his thesis in Wisconsin, Brown worked briefly as a postdoctoral fellow with Snell in Texas.

== Academic career ==
Brown was offered a faculty position at MIT by Jack Buchanan, who at the time was interested in recruiting biochemists. Brown began at MIT in 1954 as an instructor and later advanced through the ranks to full professor. He served as the associate head of the department from 1967 to 1977 and as the head from 1977 to 1985, succeeding Boris Magasanik. Under his leadership, funding was obtained and plans were made for the launch of MIT's Whitehead Institute.

In 1985 Brown became the dean of science at MIT. During his tenure as dean, he worked on curricular issues, including the development of a communication requirement to be incorporated into the undergraduate program and the planning stages of a new building for biology research. He was also involved in investigating what became known as the "Baltimore affair", a high-profile allegation of research misconduct against then-MIT faculty members David Baltimore and Thereza Imanishi-Kari. (They were eventually cleared of misconduct.) Brown closed his research laboratory during his service as dean, citing time pressure; after he resigned in 1991, he moved to spending his time on teaching and administrative work in the department. Brown became a fellow of the American Academy of Arts and Sciences in 1999.

=== Teaching ===
Brown is notable for his longevity as an educator, having started teaching the department's undergraduate biochemistry class when he arrived in 1954. In 2004 he was honored for teaching it continuously for 50 years. Brown also taught other undergraduate courses and served as the department's coordinator for undergraduate research. In 1994 Brown was one of four MIT professors named that year as MacVicar Fellows, which provided support for faculty interested in developing improvements to undergraduate education.

MIT gives two teaching awards named after Brown: the Gene Brown Prize, which recognizes academic and teaching excellence among undergraduates, and the Gene Brown-Merck Teaching Award, which recognizes excellence in teaching among graduate students.

=== Research ===
Brown's research interests focused on metabolic biochemistry, particularly in prokaryotes. His PhD work involved isolating and identifying a compound needed for the growth of Lactobacillus bulgaricus, which proved to be pantethine, an intermediate in the synthesis of coenzyme A. He based his research as a faculty member on broadening this work to identifying additional coenzymes and studying their biosynthesis. He was particularly instrumental in understanding the biosynthesis of folic acid and related pteridine compounds, and later described this work as the research he was most proud of.

== Personal life ==
While working in Texas with Snell, Brown met a faculty member there who taught music theory. On the second date they had they decided to get married and they did on June 15, known as Flag Day.
