= 3-methyl-2-oxobutanoate hydroxymethyltransferase =

Class of enzymes

Identifiers
- EC no.: 2.1.2.11
- CAS no.: 56093-17-5

Databases
- IntEnz: IntEnz view
- BRENDA: BRENDA entry
- ExPASy: NiceZyme view
- KEGG: KEGG entry
- MetaCyc: metabolic pathway
- PRIAM: profile
- PDB structures: RCSB PDB PDBe PDBsum
- Gene Ontology: AmiGO / QuickGO
Search
- PMC: articles
- PubMed: articles
- NCBI: proteins

In enzymology, a 3-methyl-2-oxobutanoate hydroxymethyltransferase (EC 2.1.2.11) is an enzyme that catalyzes the chemical reaction

α-Ketoisovaleric acid
+ 5,10-CH_{2}-THF
H_{2}O
H_{2}O
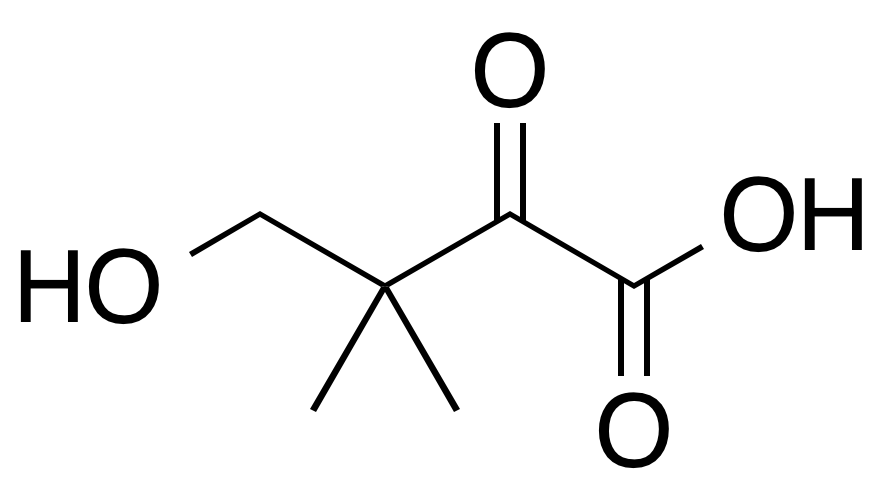
Ketopantoic acid
+ THF

The enzyme converts α-ketoisovaleric acid into ketopantoic acid by hydroxymethylation. The CH_{2}OH is transferred from the cofactor 5,10-methylenetetrahydrofolate (5,10-CH_{2}-THF), which is converted to tetrahydrofolate (THF).

This enzyme belongs to the family of transferases that transfer one-carbon groups, specifically the hydroxymethyl-, formyl- and related transferases. The systematic name of this enzyme class is 5,10-methylenetetrahydrofolate:3-methyl-2-oxobutanoate hydroxymethyltransferase. Other names in common use include alpha-ketoisovalerate hydroxymethyltransferase, dehydropantoate hydroxymethyltransferase, ketopantoate hydroxymethyltransferase, oxopantoate hydroxymethyltransferase, 5,10-methylene tetrahydrofolate:alpha-ketoisovalerate, and hydroxymethyltransferase. This enzyme participates in pantothenate and coa biosynthesis.

== Structural studies ==
As of late 2007, 4 structures have been solved for this class of enzymes, with PDB accession codes 1M3U, 1O66, 1O68, and 1OY0.
