= COASY =

Protein-coding gene in mammals

Available structures
| PDB | Ortholog search: PDBe RCSB |
| PDB | List of PDB id codes 2F6R |

Identifiers
- Aliases: COASY, DPCK, NBIA6, NBP, PPAT, UKR1, pOV-2, Coenzyme A synthase, PCH12
- External IDs: OMIM: 609855; MGI: 1918993; HomoloGene: 11889; GeneCards: COASY; OMA:COASY - orthologs

Gene location (Human)
| Chr. | Chromosome 17 (human) |
| Band | 17q21.2 | Start | 42,561,467 bp |
| Band | 17q21.2 | End | 42,566,277 bp |

Gene location (Mouse)
| Chr. | Chromosome 11 (mouse) |
| Band | 11|11 D | Start | 100,973,391 bp |
| Band | 11|11 D | End | 100,977,445 bp |
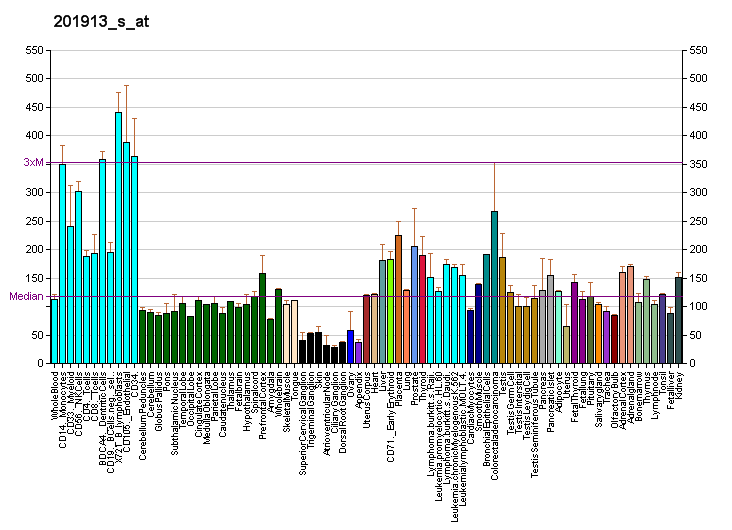
RNA expression pattern
| Bgee | Human / Mouse (ortholog); Top expressed in: mucosa of transverse colon; parotid gland; body of pancreas; right adrenal cortex; right lobe of liver; left adrenal gland; left adrenal cortex; right lobe of thyroid gland; body of stomach; left lobe of thyroid gland / Top expressed in: right kidney; proximal tubule; human kidney; left lobe of liver; brown adipose tissue; external carotid artery; internal carotid artery; supraoptic nucleus; lacrimal gland; tunica adventitia of aorta; More reference expression data |
| BioGPS | More reference expression data |
Gene ontology
| Molecular function | transferase activity; nucleotide binding; nucleotidyltransferase activity; kinase activity; protein binding; catalytic activity; ATP binding; pantetheine-phosphate adenylyltransferase activity; dephospho-CoA kinase activity |
| Cellular component | mitochondrial outer membrane; mitochondrial matrix; mitochondrion; extracellular exosome; cytoplasm; nucleoplasm; cytosol |
| Biological process | phosphorylation; biosynthesis; coenzyme A biosynthetic process; metabolism |
Sources:Amigo / QuickGO
Orthologs
| Species | Human | Mouse |
| Entrez | 80347 | 71743 |
| Ensembl | ENSG00000068120 | ENSMUSG00000001755 |
| UniProt | Q13057 | Q9DBL7 |
| RefSeq (mRNA) | NM_001042529; NM_001042530; NM_001042531; NM_001042532; NM_025233 | NM_027896; NM_001305982 |
| RefSeq (protein) | NP_001035994; NP_001035997; NP_079509 | NP_001292911 |
| Location (UCSC) | Chr 17: 42.56 – 42.57 Mb | Chr 11: 100.97 – 100.98 Mb |
| PubMed search |
- Wikidata
| View/Edit Human | View/Edit Mouse |

Bifunctional coenzyme A synthase is an enzyme that in mammals is encoded by the COASY gene that catalyses the synthesis of coenzyme A from 4'-phosphopantetheine.

== Function ==
COASY is an enzyme that catalyzes the last two steps in the synthesis of coenzyme A from vitamin B_{5} (pantothenic acid). The primary substrate is 4'-phosphopantetheine and COASY is a bifunctional enzyme in this pathway:

- 4′-Phosphopantetheine is adenylated to form dephospho-CoA by the enzyme phosphopantetheine adenylyl-transferase (PPAT; CoaD)
- Next, dephospho-CoA is phosphorylated to coenzyme A by the enzyme dephospho-CoA kinase (DPCK; CoaE)

In mammals this is a single enzyme, but in organisms including yeast and bacteria these enzymes are encoded by separate genes.

== Interactions ==
COASY has been shown to interact with P70-S6 Kinase 1. In 2009, COASY has also been implicated in PI3K signaling, as it was shown to interact with a regulatory subunit of PI3K.

== Clinical significance ==
Loss of function mutations to COASY have been associated with an ultra-rare disease that causes neurodegeneration with brain iron accumulation called COASY protein-associated neurodegeneration (CoPAN), or NBIA6.
