= Pantothenase =

Class of enzymes

Identifiers
- EC no.: 3.5.1.22
- CAS no.: 9076-90-8

Databases
- BRENDA: enzyme data
- ExPASy: NiceZyme view
- KEGG: enzyme entry
- MetaCyc: metabolic pathway
- Rhea: reactions
- PDB structures: RCSB PDB PDBe PDBsum
- Gene Ontology: AmiGO / QuickGO
Search
- PMC: articles
- PubMed: articles
- NCBI: proteins

Pantothenase (EC 3.5.1.22) is an enzyme that catalyzes the chemical reaction

pantothenic acid
H_{2}O
(R)-pantoic acid
+
β-alanine

The enzyme characterised from Pseudomonas bacteria hydrolyses vitamin B_{5}, pantothenic acid, to (R)-pantoic acid and β-alanine.

This enzyme is a hydrolase, one acting on carbon-nitrogen bonds other than peptide bonds, specifically in linear amides. The systematic name of this enzyme class is (R)-pantothenate amidohydrolase. Other names in use include pantothenate hydrolase, and pantothenate amidohydrolase.
