= Beverly Guirard =

Biochemist and microbiologist

- Born: December 10, 1915; St. Martinville, Louisiana
- Died: January 17, 2006 (aged 90)
- Education: University of Texas
- Scientific career
- Thesis: The nutritional role of acetate for lactic acid bacteria (1945)
- Doctoral advisor: Roger J. Williams

Beverly Marie Guirard was a microbiologist who worked on the biochemistry of microbial growth, especially with respect to vitamin B6. She is also known for her work defining the components of coenzyme A which was a part of the research that led to a Nobel Prize for Fritz Albert Lipmann.

== Education and career ==
Guirard grew up in Louisiana and went to high school in St. Martinville, Louisiana. Guirard received a B.S. from Southwestern Louisiana Institute in 1936, and a masters degree from Louisiana State University in 1938. She went on to earn a Ph.D. from the University of Texas in 1945 where she worked on lactic acid bacteria and their conversion of acetate into lipids and steroidal material, research which built upon Esmond Emerson Snell's earliest work that identified acetate as a key factor leading to reliable growth of microorganisms. After her Ph.D. she remained at the University of Texas, where she joined Snell's lab in 1951. She moved with the lab to the University of California, Berkeley in 1956, and then returned to Texas in 1976 where she worked until her retirement in 1990.

== Research ==
Guirard is known for her research into the biochemical compounds determining microbial growth, especially vitamins and amino acids. Her early research determined how to isolate vitamins from tissue extracts. During her Ph.D, Guirard established how acetate stimulated growth of the bacteria Lactobacillus casei. She went on to use bacteria to determine the levels of amino acids inside cells, and worked with Robert Wagner on synthesis of pantothenic acid in his model system of the fungus Neurospora.

Guirard worked with Fritz Albert Lipmann who won the 1953 Nobel Prize for the discovery of coenzyme A. During the research that led to the discovery of coenzyme A, Lipmann used pigeon liver as a source for the coenzyme. As Lipmann and others have described, Guirard examined this material and discovered that the vitamin pantothenic acid only appeared after extended enzymatic activity. She confirmed this observation by hydrolyzing the coenzyme into adenylic acid and Β-alanine and thereby demonstrating that the vitamin pantothenic acid was a part of the coenzyme; this work was published with Lipmann, Nathan Kaplan, Constance Tuttle, and G. David Novelli in 1947. A second publication provided more details on how to prepare coenyzme A with details on its vitamin content and structure. Later, Kaplan detailed Guirard's experiments and noted her repeated investigations into the samples she received, and how it was only through her extended curiosity that she was able to identify the presence of pantothenic acid within conenzyme A. Lipmann also describes Guirard's expertise in finding pantothenic acid in tissue extracts, and how this led to the observation that an enzyme removed pantothenic acid from coenzyme A. In 1953, Lipmann reviewed the chemistry and function of coenyzme A and he noted it was 'through [Guirard]'s skillful observations that pantothenic acid was detected in the coenzyme".

Guirard was a long-time associate of Esmond Emerson Snell, and was a part of the team that discovered the different forms of vitamin B6. Her work in this realm included investigations into enzymes including ornithine decarboxylase and histidine decarboxylase. She established the amino acids, vitamins, or combination of amino acids and vitamins required for microbial growth. She also used microbial growth as an assay to determine the effectiveness of anti-tumor agents, and examined the role of polyamines such as spermine and spermidine on cell growth.

== Selected publications ==
- Snell, Esmond E.; Guirard, Beverly M.; Williams, Roger J. (1942). "Occurrence in Natural Products of a Physiologically Active Metabolite of Pyridoxine". Journal of Biological Chemistry. 143 (2): 519–530. doi:10.1016/S0021-9258(18)72641-0.
- Lipmann, Fritz; Kaplan, Nathan O.; Novelli, G. David; Tuttle, L. Constance; Guirard, Beverly M. (1947). "Coenzyme for Acetylation, A Pantothenic Acid DerivativeF". Journal of Biological Chemistry. 167 (3): 869–870. doi:10.1016/S0021-9258(17)30973-0. PMID 20287921.
- Lipmann, Fritz.; Kaplan, Nathan O.; Novelli, G. David; Tuttle, L. Constance; Guirard, Beverly M. (September 1950). "Isolation of Coenzyme A". Journal of Biological Chemistry. 186 (1): 235–243. doi:10.1016/S0021-9258(18)56309-2. PMID 14778827.
- Rosenthaler, J.; Guirard, B. M.; Chang, G. W.; Snell, E. E. (1965-07-01). "Purification and properties of histidine decarboxylase from Lactobacillus 30a". Proceedings of the National Academy of Sciences. 54 (1): 152–158. Bibcode:1965PNAS...54..152R. doi:10.1073/pnas.54.1.152. ISSN 0027-8424. PMC 285813. PMID 5216347.
- Guirard, Beverly (1973). "The amino acid requirements of microorganisms for growth". In Lechevalier, Hubert A. (ed.). CRC Handbook of Microbiology. CRC Press. ISBN 978-0-87819-580-0.

== Personal life ==
The Beverly Guirard endowment at the University Catholic Center in Austin, Texas was established in honor of Guirard.
