= Pantetheine kinase =

Class of enzymes

Identifiers
- EC no.: 2.7.1.34
- CAS no.: 9026-49-7

Databases
- IntEnz: IntEnz view
- BRENDA: BRENDA entry
- ExPASy: NiceZyme view
- KEGG: KEGG entry
- MetaCyc: metabolic pathway
- PRIAM: profile
- PDB structures: RCSB PDB PDBe PDBsum
- Gene Ontology: AmiGO / QuickGO
Search
- PMC: articles
- PubMed: articles
- NCBI: proteins

Pantetheine kinase (EC 2.7.1.34) is an enzyme that catalyzes the chemical reaction

ATP +
pantetheine
ADP +
phosphopantetheine

The enzyme converts pantetheine to phosphopantetheine by transferring a phosphate group from the cofactor, adenosine triphosphate (ATP), which is converted to adenosine diphosphate (ADP). This is part of the biosynthetic pathway to coenzyme A.

This enzyme is a transferases, specifically one transferring phosphorus-containing groups (phosphotransferases) with an alcohol group as acceptor. The systematic name of this enzyme class is ATP:pantetheine 4'-phosphotransferase. It is also called pantetheine kinase (phosphorylating).
