= 3-methyl-2-oxobutanoate dehydrogenase (ferredoxin) =

Class of enzymes

Identifiers
- EC no.: 1.2.7.7

Databases
- IntEnz: IntEnz view
- BRENDA: BRENDA entry
- ExPASy: NiceZyme view
- KEGG: KEGG entry
- MetaCyc: metabolic pathway
- PRIAM: profile
- PDB structures: RCSB PDB PDBe PDBsum
- Gene Ontology: AmiGO / QuickGO
Search
- PMC: articles
- PubMed: articles
- NCBI: proteins

In enzymology, 3-methyl-2-oxobutanoate dehydrogenase (ferredoxin) (EC 1.2.7.7) is an enzyme that catalyzes the chemical reaction

α-Ketoisovaleric acid
+ coenzyme A + 2 oxidised ferredoxin
CO_{2} + H^{+}
CO_{2} + H^{+}
Isobutyryl-CoA
+ 2 reduced ferredoxin

The substrates of this enzyme are α-ketoisovaleric acid, coenzyme A, and oxidized ferredoxin. Its products are isobutyryl-CoA, carbon dioxide, reduced ferredoxin, and a proton.

This enzyme belongs to the family of oxidoreductases, specifically those acting on the aldehyde or oxo group of donor with an iron-sulfur protein as acceptor. The systematic name of this enzyme class is '. Other names in common use include 2-ketoisovalerate ferredoxin reductase', 3-methyl-2-oxobutanoate synthase (ferredoxin), VOR, branched-chain ketoacid ferredoxin reductase, branched-chain oxo acid ferredoxin reductase, keto-valine-ferredoxin oxidoreductase, ketoisovalerate ferredoxin reductase, and 2-oxoisovalerate ferredoxin reductase.
