= Valine dehydrogenase (NAD+) =

Valine dehydrogenase (NAD^{+})

Identifiers
- EC no.: 1.4.1.23

Databases
- IntEnz: IntEnz view
- BRENDA: BRENDA entry
- ExPASy: NiceZyme view
- KEGG: KEGG entry
- MetaCyc: metabolic pathway
- PRIAM: profile
- PDB structures: RCSB PDB PDBe PDBsum
Search
- PMC: articles
- PubMed: articles
- NCBI: proteins

Valine dehydrogenase (NAD^{+}) (EC 1.4.1.23) is an enzyme with systematic name L-valine:NAD^{+} oxidoreductase (deaminating). This enzyme catalyses the following chemical reaction

Valine
+ NAD^{+}
H_{2}O
H^{+}
H_{2}O
H^{+}
α-Ketoisovaleric acid
+ NADH + NH_{3}

The enzyme from Streptomyces spp. uses nicotinamide adenine dinucleotide as its cofactor but has no activity with NADP^{+}.

== See also ==
- Valine dehydrogenase (NADP+)
