= Ketopantoic acid =

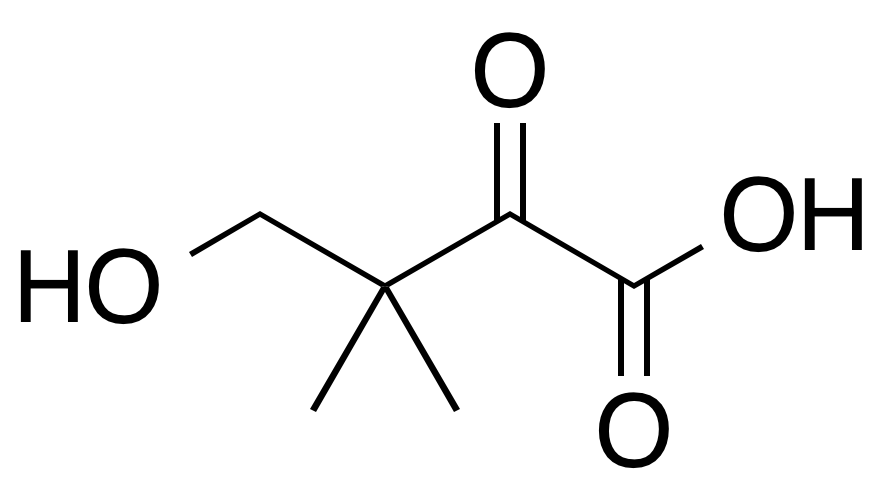

Names
- Other names 4-Hydroxy-3,3-dimethyl-2-oxobutanoic acid; 2-Dehydropantoic acid

Identifiers
CAS Number	470-30-4
3D model (JSmol)	Interactive image
Beilstein Reference	2242422
ChEBI	CHEBI:17094
ChemSpider	37
DrugBank	DB03795
KEGG	C00966
PubChem CID	38
UNII	GZM7NYS95Z
CompTox Dashboard (EPA)	DTXSID90274258
- InChI: InChI=1S/C6H10O4/c1-6(2,3-7)4(8)5(9)10/h7H,3H2,1-2H3,(H,9,10) Key: PKVVTUWHANFMQC-UHFFFAOYSA-N
- SMILES: CC(C)(CO)C(=O)C(=O)O

Properties
Chemical formula	C_{6}H_{10}O_{4}
Molar mass	146.142 g·mol^{−1}
Appearance	colorless or white
- Except where otherwise noted, data are given for materials in their standard state (at 25 °C [77 °F], 100 kPa). Infobox references

Ketopantoic acid is the organic compound with the formula HOCH_{2}(CH_{3})_{2}CC(O)CO_{2}H. At physiological conditions, ketopantoic acid exists as its conjugate base, ketopantoate (HOCH_{2}(CH_{3})_{2}CC(O)CO_{2}^{−}).

== Biosynthetic context ==
Its biosynthesis proceeds from ketoisovalerate by hydroxymethylation:

(CH_{3})_{2}CHC(O)CO_{2}^{−} + CH_{2}O → HOCH_{2}(CH_{3})_{2}CC(O)CO_{2}^{−}

This conversion is catalyzed by ketopantoate hydroxymethyltransferase, which gives ketopantoate.

Ketopantoate is substrate for 2-dehydropantoate 2-reductase, which produces (R)-pantoic acid, a precursor to pantothenic acid, a common prosthetic group.

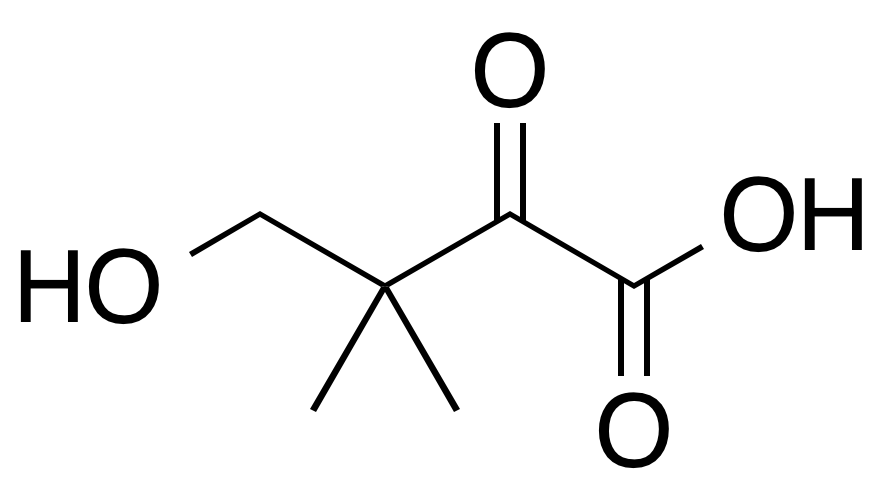
ketopantoic acid
+ NADPH
H^{+}
H^{+}
(R)-pantoic acid
+ NADP^{+}
