= 2-dehydropantoate 2-reductase =

Class of enzymes

Identifiers
- EC no.: 1.1.1.169
- CAS no.: 37211-74-8

Databases
- IntEnz: IntEnz view
- BRENDA: BRENDA entry
- ExPASy: NiceZyme view
- KEGG: KEGG entry
- MetaCyc: metabolic pathway
- PRIAM: profile
- PDB structures: RCSB PDB PDBe PDBsum
- Gene Ontology: AmiGO / QuickGO
Search
- PMC: articles
- PubMed: articles
- NCBI: proteins

In enzymology, 2-dehydropantoate 2-reductase (EC 1.1.1.169) is an enzyme that catalyzes the chemical reaction

(R)-pantoic acid
+ NADP^{+}
H^{+}
H^{+}
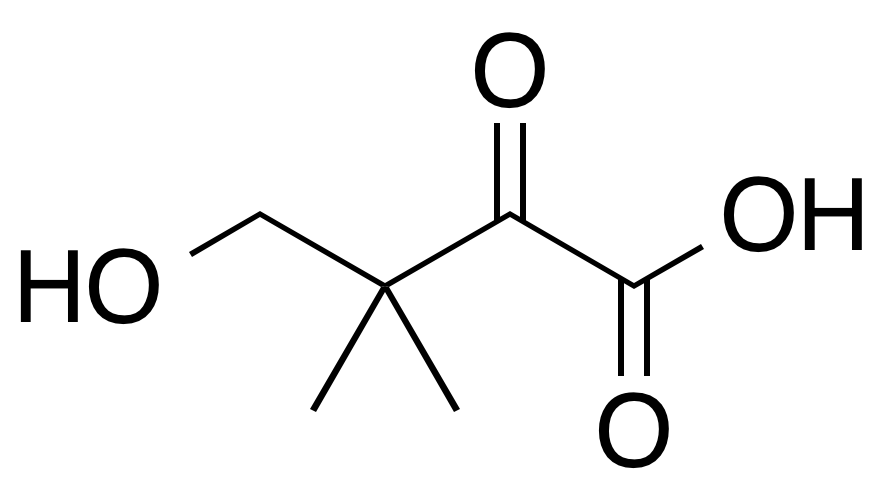
ketopantoic acid
+ NADPH

The two substrates of this enzyme are (R)-pantoic acid and oxidised nicotinamide adenine dinucleotide phosphate (NADP^{+}). Its products are ketopantoic acid, reduced NADPH, and a proton.

This enzyme belongs to the family of oxidoreductases, specifically those acting on the CH-OH group of donor with NAD^{+} or NADP^{+} as acceptor. The systematic name of this enzyme class is (R)-pantoate:NADP^{+} 2-oxidoreductase. Other names in common use include 2-oxopantoate reductase, 2-ketopantoate reductase, 2-ketopantoic acid reductase, ketopantoate reductase, and ketopantoic acid reductase. This enzyme participates in pantothenate and coa biosynthesis.

== Structural studies ==
As of late 2007, 5 structures have been solved for this class of enzymes, with PDB accession codes 1KS9, 1YJQ, 1YON, 2EW2, and 2OFP.
