= Pantetheine hydrolase =

Class of enzymes

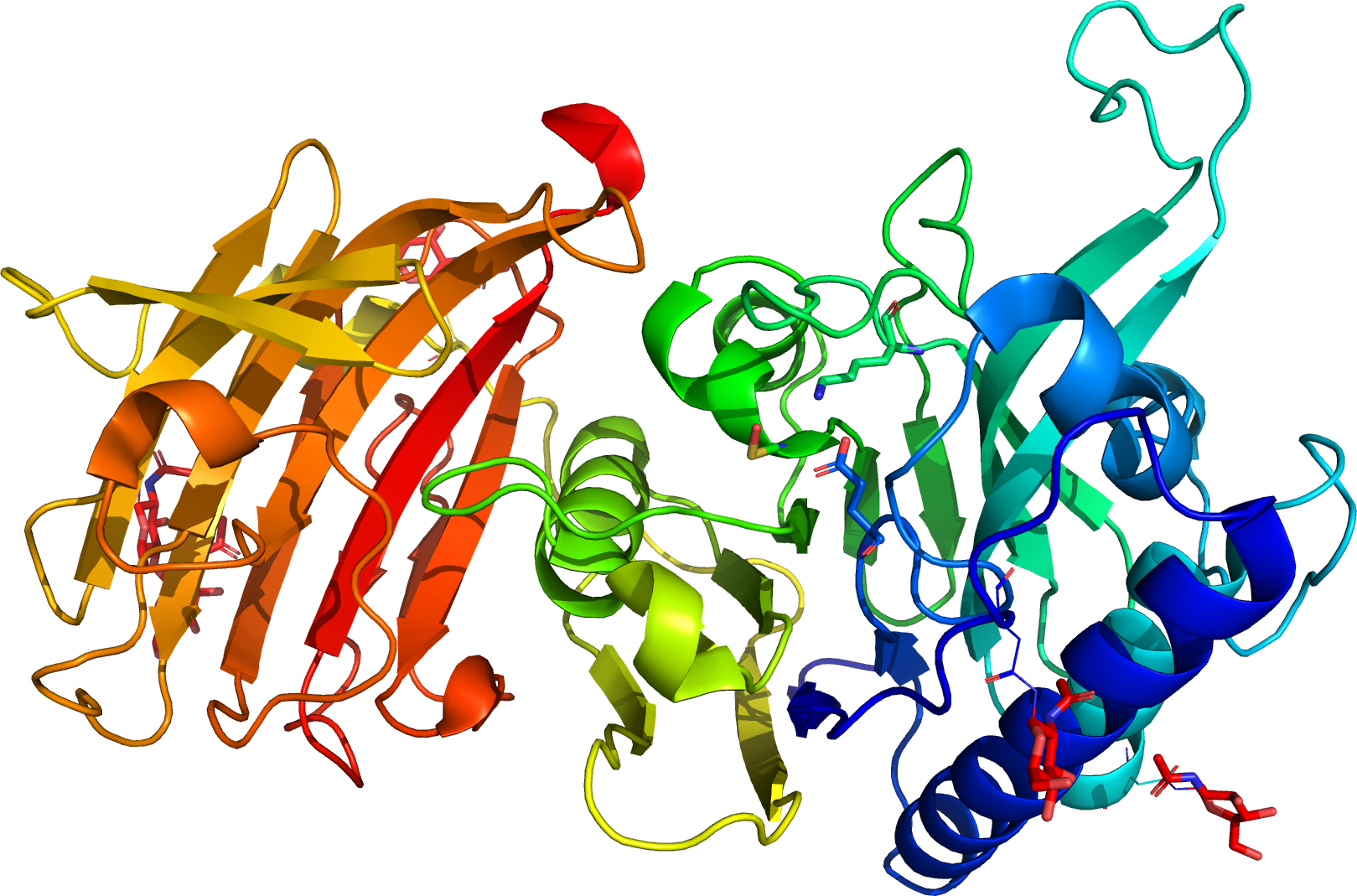
- Structure of the pantetheinase vanin-1 from PDB: 4CYF. Catalytic residues and sugars are shown in sticks, sugar-binding residues in lines.

Identifiers
- EC no.: 3.5.1.92

Databases
- BRENDA: enzyme data
- ExPASy: NiceZyme view
- KEGG: enzyme entry
- MetaCyc: metabolic pathway
- Rhea: reactions
- PDB structures: RCSB PDB PDBe PDBsum
Search
- PMC: articles
- PubMed: articles
- NCBI: proteins

Pantetheine hydrolase (EC 3.5.1.92) is an enzyme characterised from kidney that catalyzes the hydrolysis of one of the two amide bonds in pantetheine, giving pantothenic acid and cysteamine:

pantetheine
H_{2}O
pantothenic acid
+
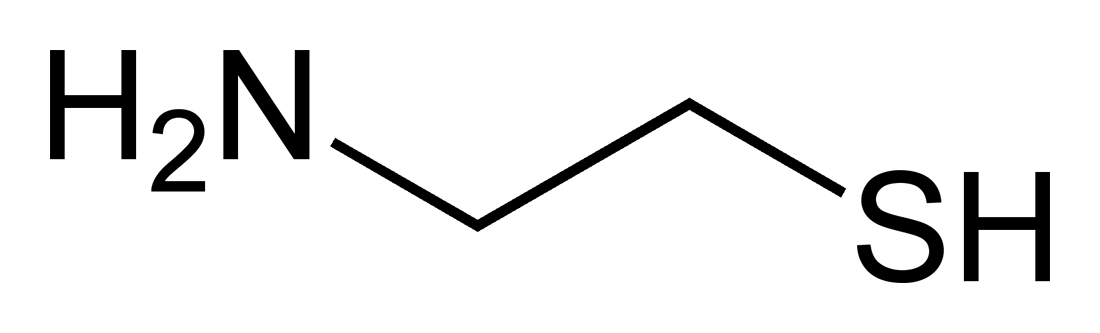
cysteamine

The enzyme is part of the catabolism of pantethine (vitamin B5) and one product, cysteamine, is an antioxidant. In humans, the enzyme is a vanin-1 protein. It has a role in inflammatory diseases like asthma.

This enzyme is a hydrolase, one acting on carbon-nitrogen bonds other than peptide bonds, specifically in linear amides. The systematic name of this enzyme class is (R)-pantetheine amidohydrolase. Other names in common use include pantetheinase, vanin, and vanin-1.
