= Copan (disambiguation) =

Copán is a major Mayan archaeological site (a UNESCO World Heritage Site) in Honduras.

Copan or Copán may refer to:

== Places ==
=== Brazil ===
- Edifício Copan, a landmark building in São Paulo

=== Honduras ===
- Copán Department, the province in Honduras containing the Mayan ruins at Copán as well as other ruins at La Entrada
- Copán Ruinas, the Honduran town near the archaeological site
- Santa Rosa de Copán, the capital of the department

=== United States ===
- Copan, Oklahoma, a town

== People ==
- Paul Copan

== Medical ==
- CoPAN is an acronym for a rare disease, COASY protein-associated neurodegeneration, which is a type of neurodegeneration with brain iron accumulation disorder
- Copan Group is an Italian multinational biotechnology company that manufactures testing devices and laboratory automation equipment with a focus on microbiology and molecular biology, most widely known for their invention of flocked swabs.
