= Dimethylmalate dehydrogenase =

Class of enzymes

dimethylmalate dehydrogenase

Identifiers
- EC no.: 1.1.1.84
- CAS no.: 37250-21-8

Databases
- IntEnz: IntEnz view
- BRENDA: BRENDA entry
- ExPASy: NiceZyme view
- KEGG: KEGG entry
- MetaCyc: metabolic pathway
- PRIAM: profile
- PDB structures: RCSB PDB PDBe PDBsum
- Gene Ontology: AmiGO / QuickGO
Search
- PMC: articles
- PubMed: articles
- NCBI: proteins

In enzymology, dimethylmalate dehydrogenase (EC 1.1.1.84) is an enzyme that catalyzes the chemical reaction

(R)-3,3-dimethylmalic acid
+ NAD^{+}
H^{+}
H^{+}
α-Ketoisovaleric acid
+ CO_{2} + NADH

The two substrates of this enzyme are (R)-3,3-dimethylmalic acid and oxidised nicotinamide adenine dinucleotide (NAD^{+}). Its products are α-ketoisovaleric acid, carbon dioxide, reduced NADH, and a proton.

This enzyme belongs to the family of oxidoreductases, specifically those acting on the CH-OH group of donor with NAD^{+} or NADP^{+} as acceptor. The systematic name of this enzyme class is (R)-3,3-dimethylmalate:NAD^{+} oxidoreductase (decarboxylating). This enzyme is also called beta,beta-dimethylmalate dehydrogenase. This enzyme participates in pantothenate and coa biosynthesis. It has 5 cofactors: ammonia, manganese, cobalt, potassium, and NH_{4}^{+}.
