= Alexander Braunstein =

Alexander Braunstein may refer to:

- Alexander Braunstein, American politician
- Alexander E. Braunstein, Soviet biochemist
