= Pantoate 4-dehydrogenase =

pantoate 4-dehydrogenase

Identifiers
- EC no.: 1.1.1.106
- CAS no.: 37250-38-7

Databases
- IntEnz: IntEnz view
- BRENDA: BRENDA entry
- ExPASy: NiceZyme view
- KEGG: KEGG entry
- MetaCyc: metabolic pathway
- PRIAM: profile
- PDB structures: RCSB PDB PDBe PDBsum
- Gene Ontology: AmiGO / QuickGO
Search
- PMC: articles
- PubMed: articles
- NCBI: proteins

In enzymology, pantoate 4-dehydrogenase (EC 1.1.1.106) is an enzyme that catalyzes the chemical reaction

(R)-pantoic acid
+ NAD^{+}
H^{+}
H^{+}
(R)-4-dehydropantoic acid
+ NADH

The two substrates of this enzyme are (R)-pantoic acid and oxidised nicotinamide adenine dinucleotide (NAD^{+}). Its products are (R)-4-dehydropantoic acid, reduced NADH, and a proton.

This enzyme belongs to the family of oxidoreductases, specifically those acting on the CH-OH group of donor with NAD^{+} or NADP^{+} as acceptor. The systematic name of this enzyme class is (R)-pantoate:NAD^{+} 4-oxidoreductase. Other names in common use include pantoate dehydrogenase, pantothenase, and D-pantoate:NAD^{+} 4-oxidoreductase. This enzyme participates in pantothenate and coa biosynthesis.
