= Pantothenoylcysteine decarboxylase =

Class of enzymes

Identifiers
- EC no.: 4.1.1.30
- CAS no.: 9024-65-1

Databases
- BRENDA: enzyme data
- ExPASy: NiceZyme view
- KEGG: enzyme entry
- MetaCyc: metabolic pathway
- Rhea: reactions
- PDB structures: RCSB PDB PDBe PDBsum
- Gene Ontology: AmiGO / QuickGO
Search
- PMC: articles
- PubMed: articles
- NCBI: proteins

Pantothenoylcysteine decarboxylase (EC 4.1.1.30) is an enzyme characterised from Lactobacillus helveticus that catalyzes the decarboxylation of pantothenoylcysteine to pantetheine and carbon dioxide:

pantothenoylcysteine
CO_{2}
pantetheine

This enzyme is a lyase, specifically a carboxy-lyase, which cleave carbon-carbon bonds. The systematic name of this enzyme class is N-[(R)-pantothenoyl]-L-cysteine carboxy-lyase (pantetheine-forming). Other names in use include pantothenylcysteine decarboxylase, and N-[(R)-pantothenoyl]-L-cysteine carboxy-lyase.

== See also ==
- Phosphopantothenoylcysteine decarboxylase, which catalyses the same reaction of a phosphorylated substrate, giving phosphopantetheine
