= Roger J. Williams =

American biochemist

- Born: August 14, 1893; Ootacamund, Nilgiris District, Madras Presidency, British India (now Ooty (Udhagamandalam), Tamil Nadu, India)
- Died: February 20, 1988 (aged 94); Austin, Texas, United States
- Occupations: Biochemist, nutritionist

Roger John Williams (August 14, 1893 – February 20, 1988), was an American biochemist. He is known for his work on vitamins and human nutrition. He had leading roles in the discovery of folic acid, pantothenic acid, vitamin B6, lipoic acid, and avidin. He was elected to the National Academy of Sciences in 1946, and served as the president of the American Chemical Society in 1957. In his later career he spent time writing for a popular audience on the importance of nutrition.

== Early life and education ==
Roger John Williams was born in Ootacamund, India of American parents on August 14, 1893. His family returned to the US when he was two years old, and he grew up in Kansas and California. He attributed his early interest in chemistry to the influence of his brother Robert R. Williams, eight years his senior, who was also a chemist. Robert is remembered for being the first to synthesize thiamine (vitamin B1). Roger was an undergraduate at the University of Redlands and received his bachelor's degree in 1914. He received a teaching certificate from the University of California, Berkeley the following year and began work as a science teacher in California. After a year of teaching, he decided to return to school and began graduate work at the University of Chicago, from which he received his Ph.D. in 1919. His Ph.D. thesis was entitled The Vitamine Requirements of Yeasts. Julius Stieglitz was the chairman of the department of chemistry at U Chicago when Roger Williams was a student there, and Williams later described Stieglitz as a major influence upon him in organic chemistry.

== Academic career ==
Williams began his academic research career by joining the faculty at the University of Oregon in 1920. During the following twelve years he spent there, he discovered pantothenic acid. In 1932 he moved to Oregon State College and in 1939 he moved again to the University of Texas at Austin. He founded and became the founding director of the Biochemical Institute (later the Clayton Foundation Biochemical Institute) in 1940 with funding from Benjamin Clayton.

Williams' research program was notable in that he used yeast as model organisms to study nutritional requirements, on the hypothesis that the underlying cellular biochemistry was generalizable from yeast to animals. He aimed to study vitamins, at the time known as animal nutrients whose chemical properties were not characterized. This approach was successful in leading to the discovery of pantothenic acid, published in 1933, which prompted renewed interest among biochemists in microbial metabolism. Williams and his colleagues in Texas – including Robert Eakin, Beverly Guirard, Esmond Snell, William Shive, and Lester Reed – continued this work and used the technique to discover a number of other vitamins and nutrients. Williams and Snell, along with student Herschel K. Mitchell, isolated and named folic acid by extracting it from four tons of processed spinach. He also worked on discovering and isolating vitamin B6, lipoic acid, and avidin.

Throughout his career Williams was a prolific writer, producing not only hundreds of scientific papers but also a number of widely used textbooks. Williams retired from his role at the director of the Biochemical Institute in 1963 and from the University of Texas in 1986.

== Nutrition educator ==
Roger Williams devoted much of his later years to educating the public about the benefits of complete and proper nutrition to good health. This consisted chiefly of him writing popular books about nutrition. One of Williams's popular books is entitled Biochemical Individuality. In it, Williams emphasized the uniqueness of each person in their metabolic makeup and micronutrient needs. Because of "biochemical individuality", nutritional requirements are not fully the same for everybody.

== Awards and honors ==
- Elected to the National Academy of Sciences, 1946
- President of the American Chemical Society, 1957
- Fellow of the American Association for the Advancement of Science

== Personal life ==
Williams married his high school sweetheart Hazel Elizabeth Wood in 1916 during his stint teaching in California. The couple had three children. After Hazel died in 1952, he married Mabel Phyllis Hobson; the two enjoyed extensive travel. Williams also enjoyed fishing and golf and played the violin and piano.

For most of his life Williams suffered from eyestrain caused by aniseikonia, a condition that was not recognized during his youth; he had glasses specially made to treat the condition in the 40s.

Williams died on February 20, 1988. His wife Phyllis survived him and died in 2004.

== Books ==
- The Human Frontier (Harcourt Brace, 1946)
- The Biochemistry of B vitamins, Roger J. Williams and others (Reinhold Pub. Corp., 1950)
- Nutrition and Alcoholism, Roger J. Williams (Univ. of Oklahoma Press, 1951)
- Free and Unequal: The Biological Basis of Individual Liberty. (Univ. of Texas Press, 1953)
- Biochemical Individuality: The Basis for the Genetotrophic Concept (John Wiley & Sons, 1956; University of Texas Press, 1969 to 1979; Keats Publishing, 1998, ISBN 0-87983-893-0) (also translated into Russian, Italian and Polish)
- Alcoholism: The Nutritional Approach (Univ. of Texas Press, 1959 to 1978)
- Nutrition in a Nutshell (1962, Doubleday and Dolphin)
- The Encyclopedia of Biochemistry, edited by Roger J. Williams and Edwin M. Lansford, Jr. (Reinhold Pub. Corp., 1967)
- You are Extraordinary (Random House, 1967)
- Nutrition Against Disease: Environmental Prevention (Pitman 1971, Bantam Books, 1973)
- Physicians' Handbook of Nutritional Science (C.C. Thomas, 1975)
- The Wonderful World Within You: Your Inner Nutritional Environment (Bantam Books, 1977; Bio-Communications Press 1987–1998)
- The Prevention of Alcoholism Through Nutrition (Bantam Books, 1981)
- Rethinking Education: The Coming Age of Enlightenment (Philosophical Library, 1986).
