= Valine dehydrogenase (NADP+) =

valine dehydrogenase (NADP)

Identifiers
- EC no.: 1.4.1.8
- CAS no.: 37255-39-3

Databases
- IntEnz: IntEnz view
- BRENDA: BRENDA entry
- ExPASy: NiceZyme view
- KEGG: KEGG entry
- MetaCyc: metabolic pathway
- PRIAM: profile
- PDB structures: RCSB PDB PDBe PDBsum
- Gene Ontology: AmiGO / QuickGO
Search
- PMC: articles
- PubMed: articles
- NCBI: proteins

In enzymology, valine dehydrogenase (NADP^{+}) (EC 1.4.1.8) is an enzyme that catalyzes the chemical reaction

Valine
+ NADP^{+}
H_{2}O
H^{+}
H_{2}O
H^{+}
α-Ketoisovaleric acid
+ NADPH + NH_{3}

The three substrates of this enzyme are L-valine, water, and oxidised nicotinamide adenine dinucleotide phosphate (NADP^{+}). Its products are α-ketoisovaleric acid, reduced NADPH, ammonia, and a proton.

This enzyme belongs to the family of oxidoreductases, specifically those acting on the CH-NH_{2} group of donors with NAD^{+} or NADP^{+} as acceptor. The systematic name of this enzyme class is L-valine:NADP^{+} oxidoreductase (deaminating). Other names in common use include valine dehydrogenase (nicotinamide adenine dinucleotide phosphate), and valine dehydrogenase (NADP^{+}).
