= Herschel K. Mitchell =

American biochemist

- Born: Herschel Kenworthy Mitchell; November 27, 1913; Los Nietos, California, US
- Died: April 1, 2000 (aged 86); Pasadena, California, US
- Education: University of Texas
- Known for: Co-discovery of folic acid, study of heat shock
- Scientific career
- Fields: Biochemistry
- Workplaces: California Institute of Technology

Herschel Kenworthy Mitchell (November 27, 1913 – April 1, 2000) was an American professor of biochemistry who spent most of his career on the faculty at the California Institute of Technology. He was one of many researchers interested in vitamin B6 in the early 1940s and is credited as one of the discoverers of folic acid. He later focused his research on Drosophila (fruit flies), in particular the genetics and biochemistry of the heat shock response.

== Early life and education ==
Mitchell was born on November 27, 1913, in Los Nietos, California. He received a bachelor's degree in chemistry from Pomona College in 1936, a master's degree from Oregon State College in 1938, and a Ph.D. from the University of Texas in 1941, where he worked with Roger J. Williams and Esmond Emerson Snell in their work on vitamin B6 and folic acid. He is recognized as a co-discoverer of folic acid, which the three scientists extracted from four tons of processed spinach.

In 1943 Mitchell moved from Texas to Stanford University to work as a research associate with George Beadle, who at the time was studying the genetics of metabolism in Neurospora (a fungus that served as a model organism). When Beadle moved his research group from Stanford to Caltech in 1946, Mitchell moved with him, along with other research fellows such as Norman Horowitz. Trained as a chemist, Mitchell used this experience to learn about molecular genetics, which he would apply to other model organisms in his future research.

== Academic career ==
Mitchell began his independent research career with an appointment as an associate professor of biology at Caltech in 1949 and advanced to full professor in 1953. His early research continued to focus on the genetics of Neurospora, including the first biochemical demonstration of a missing enzyme (tryptophan synthase) from a metabolically deficient Neurospora mutant. This finding was an essential step in establishing the central idea that genes control metabolism by producing (in a manner not then understood) the enzymes required for specific metabolic reactions. This idea came to be known as the one-gene-one-enzyme hypothesis, and later the one-gene-one-polypeptide hypothesis.

He subsequently worked on the genetics of Drosophila (fruit flies), a widely known model organism for studying genetics and development. Using fruit flies as models, he made major discoveries in understanding the heat shock response and has been described as a "founding father" of the heat shock field.

With research fellow Robert P. Wagner, Mitchell coauthored a textbook called Genetics and Metabolism in the 1950s. It was reviewed as an important guide to the then-emerging synergy between the two fields.

Mitchell retired from Caltech in 1984, assuming professor emeritus status.

== Personal life ==
Mitchell was an enthusiastic athlete who brought his hobby to Caltech, establishing a recreational athletic league for graduate students and managing the Caltech teams, which included students and faculty from a variety of departments, for 25 years. He was also a self-taught glassblower who used his skills to make chemistry laboratory equipment and for a time supported his family by working in a glassblowing shop.

Mitchell had a debilitating stroke in 1990, and recovered his speech but continued to have physical difficulties and used a wheelchair thereafter. He died on April 1, 2000, following a second stroke.
