= Edith Wilson Miles =

American biochemist

- Born: Edith Margaret Wilson
- Education: University of California, Berkeley
- Scientific career
- Thesis: The bacterial metabolism of [alpha-methylserine and hydroxymethylserine] (1962)

Edith Wilson Miles (born Edith Margaret Wilson) is a biochemist known for her work on the structure and function of enzymes, especially her work on tryptophan synthase.

== Education and career ==
Miles received her B.A. from the University of Texas at Austin in 1957, and then moved to the University of California, Berkeley where she earned a Ph.D. in 1962 working in Esmond Emerson Snell's lab with Jesse Rabinowitz and Edward Adelberg as her advisors. With funding from the American Cancer Society, she moved to the University of Leicester as a postdoctoral researcher with Hans Kornberg. From 1964 until 1966, she was a postdoctoral investigator at Tufts University working with Alton Meister, and then she accepted an independent position at the National Institutes of Health. In 2000 she became a Scientist Emeritus.

== Research ==
Wilson's graduate research characterized an enzyme that required pyridoxal phosphate and tetrahydrofolate to convert α-methylserine to alanine and formaldehyde. Her subsequent work examined the glyoxylate cycle in bacterial cells and led to further investigation of enzymes that require pyridoxal phosphate. Upon her move to the National Institutes of Health, she began to focus on tryptophan synthase, first by establishing the mechanism of the enzyme which would later allow her to investigate interactions between the subunits of the enzyme. Wilson went on to use x-ray crystallography to obtain the structure of the enzyme, and used mutant forms of Salmonella typhimurium to identify the significant components of the enzyme. She also showed that α_{2}β_{2} complex of tryptophan synthase could unfold in the presence of guanine hydrochloride, details about protein folding and shape that became relevant in later research about barrel-shaped proteins.

== Selected publications ==
- Wilson, EM; Kornberg, HL (September 1, 1963). "PROPERTIES OF CRYSTALLINE l-ASPARTATE 4-CARBOXY-LYASE FROM ACHROMOBACTER SP". Biochemical Journal. 88 (3): 578–587. doi:10.1042/bj0880578. ISSN 0006-2936. PMC 1202217. PMID 14071532.
- Hyde, C C; Ahmed, S A; Padlan, E A; Miles, E W; Davies, D R (1988). "Three-dimensional structure of the tryptophan synthase alpha 2 beta 2 multienzyme complex from Salmonella typhimurium". Journal of Biological Chemistry. 263 (33): 17857–17871. doi:10.1016/s0021-9258(19)77913-7. ISSN 0021-9258. PMID 3053720.
- Miles, Edith Wilson (1991). "Structural basis for catalysis by tryptophan synthase". Advances in enzymology : and related areas of molecular biology. Vol.64. Vol. 64. New York; Chichester: Wiley. pp. 93–172. ISBN 978-0-471-50949-3.
- Miles, Edith Wilson; Rhee, Sangkee; Davies, David R. (1999). "The Molecular Basis of Substrate Channeling". Journal of Biological Chemistry. 274 (18): 12193–12196. doi:10.1074/jbc.274.18.12193. PMID 10212181.
- Miles, Edith Wilson (April 5, 2013). "The Tryptophan Synthase α2β2 Complex: A Model for Substrate Channeling, Allosteric Communication, and Pyridoxal Phosphate Catalysis". Journal of Biological Chemistry. 288 (14): 10084–10091. doi:10.1074/jbc.X113.463331. ISSN 0021-9258. PMC 3617248. PMID 23426371.

== Awards and honors ==
While at the University of Texas at Austin, Miles (then known as Edith Margaret Wilson) was inducted into Alpha Lambda Delta, an honor society that recognizes achievement of first year university students and for which she later served as secretary. In her senior year, 1957, she was elected to Phi Beta Kappaand was a member of Mortar Board. In 1994, Miles received the Hillebrand Award, named for William Francis Hillebrand, from the Chemical Society of Washington, a section of the American Chemical Society.

== Personal life ==
Her husband, H. Todd Miles, also worked at the National Institutes of Health and became Scientist Emeritus in 2000.
