= Robert P. Wagner =

American professor of genetics

Robert Philip Wagner
- Born: May 11, 1918; The Bronx, New York City
- Died: March 3, 2004 (aged 85); Santa Fe, New Mexico
- Education: City College of New York; University of Texas at Austin
- Scientific career
- Fields: Genetics
- Workplaces: University of Texas at Austin
- Thesis: The Natural Nutrition of Drosophila mulleri and Drosophila aldrichi (1943)
- Doctoral advisor: J. T. Patterson

Robert Philip Wagner (1918-2004) was an American professor of genetics who spent most of his academic career at the University of Texas at Austin. After retiring from academics, he served as a long-term consultant for the Los Alamos National Laboratory. He wrote a number of key textbooks in genetics and was known as an enthusiastic early proponent of the Human Genome Project.

== Early life and education ==
Wagner was born on May 11, 1918, in The Bronx, New York City, as the grandson of central European immigrants. He attended Townsend Harris High School in Queens, New York, and then began his undergraduate studies at the City College of New York. Originally intending to prepare for law school, his interests changed after an early chemistry course and he graduated in 1940 with a degree in chemistry. He had planned to begin a Ph.D. with Theodosius Dobzhansky at the California Institute of Technology, but after Dobzhansky decided to relocate to Columbia University, Wagner decided he preferred not to stay in New York and instead took a position at the University of Texas at Austin to work with J. T. Patterson on the genetics of Drosophila (fruit flies). Wagner received his Ph.D. from UT in 1943.

After graduation, Wagner remained at UT for a year as an instructor of zoology. He then moved to Dallas, Texas, to work at an army-supported research job for the National Cotton Council of America.

== Academic career ==
After the end of World War II, Wagner was offered a faculty position at the University of Texas with an allowance made for time off to complete a postdoctoral fellowship. He spent a few years as a research fellow at Caltech, where he met Herschel K. Mitchell, with whom he coauthored his first book, Genetics and Metabolism. Wagner returned to Austin in 1947 to join the UT faculty and established a research program based on the genetics of the model organism Neurospora, a type of fungus. Using Neurospora as a model, Wagner worked with Beverly Guirard to demonstrate the genes needed to produce pantothenic acid and she quantified the amount of pantothenic acid made by cells with and without the genetic capacity for pantothenic acid synthesis. Wagner was among the founding members of the Society for the Study of Evolution in the 1940s. During his academic career Wagner coauthored three more textbooks.

Wagner retired from his position at UT in 1977, assuming professor emeritus status. He then moved to Santa Fe, New Mexico, where he established a relationship with Los Alamos National Laboratory. He served as a consultant for LANL until 1999. In the mid-1990s, Wagner was an enthusiastic proponent of the Human Genome Project.

== Personal life ==
Wagner met and married his wife Margaret in 1947 while in Pasadena, California, to work at Caltech. The couple had three children.

Wagner died on March 3, 2004. His papers are held by the University of Texas at Austin.
