= Hopantenic acid =

- Stereo, skeletal formula of hopantenic acid

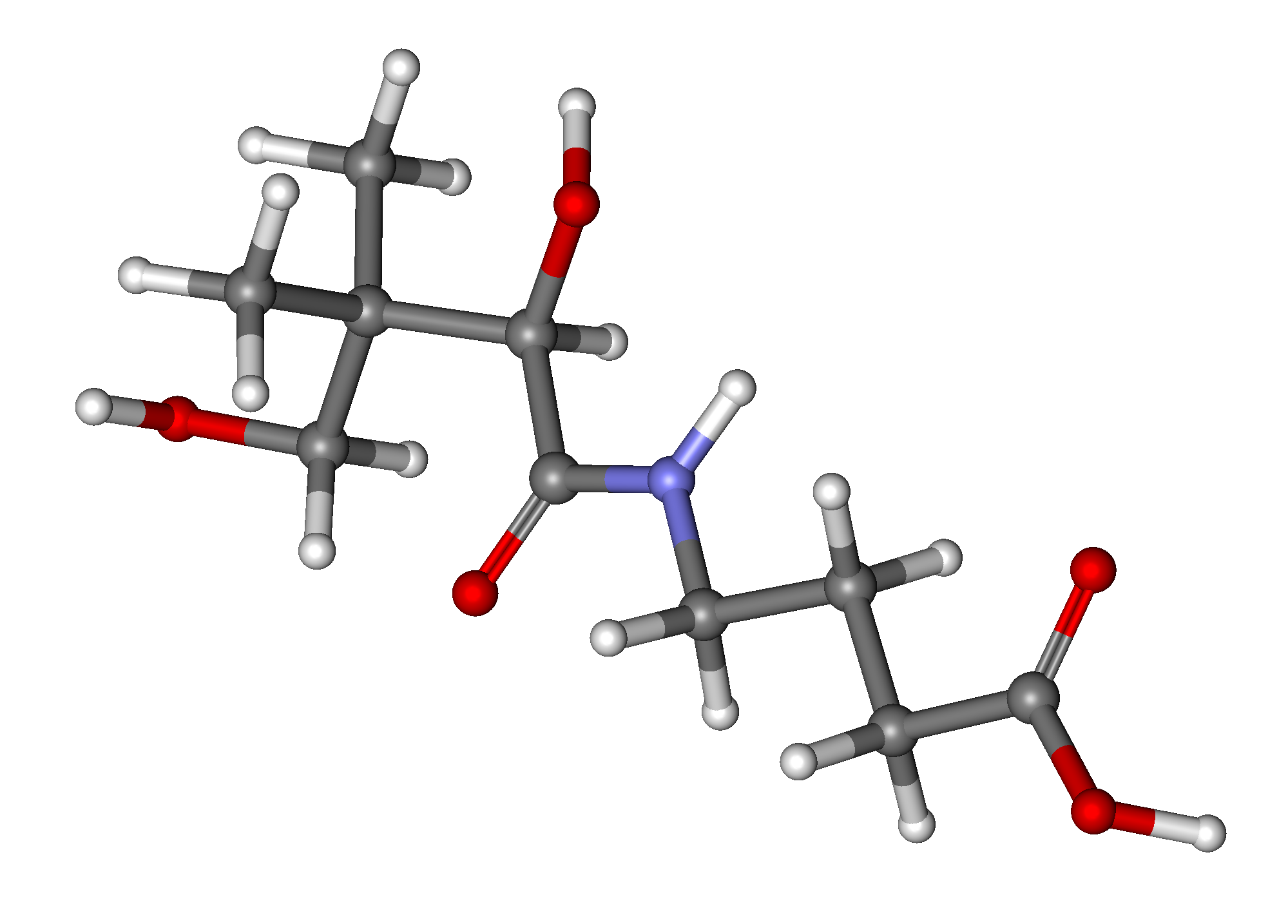

Names
- Preferred IUPAC name 4-[(2R)-2,4-Dihydroxy-3,3-dimethylbutanamido]butanoic acid

Identifiers
| CAS Number | 18679-90-8; 17097-76-6 (Calcium salt) |
| 3D model (JSmol) | Interactive image |
| ChEBI | CHEBI:134949 |
| ChEMBL | ChEMBL2110783 |
| ChemSpider | 26309 |
| DrugBank | DB14044 |
| KEGG | D08042 |
| PubChem CID | 28281 |
| UNII | H473MVB16U; LK8EOC1M6K (Calcium salt) |
| CompTox Dashboard (EPA) | DTXSID6048331 |
- InChI: InChI=1S/C10H19NO5/c1-10(2,6-12)8(15)9(16)11-5-3-4-7(13)14/h8,12,15H,3-6H2,1-2H3,(H,11,16)(H,13,14)/t8-/m0/s1 Key: SBBDHANTMHIRGW-QMMMGPOBSA-N
- SMILES: CC(C)(CO)[C@@H](O)C(=O)NCCCC(O)=O

Properties
| Chemical formula | C_{10}H_{19}NO_{5} |
| Molar mass | 233.264 g·mol^{−1} |

Related compounds
| Related alkanoic acids | Theanine; Pantothenic acid; 4-(γ-Glutamylamino)butanoic acid |
| Related compounds | Panthenol |
- Except where otherwise noted, data are given for materials in their standard state (at 25 °C [77 °F], 100 kPa). Infobox references

Hopantenic acid (homopantothenic acid), also known as N-pantoyl-GABA, is a central nervous system depressant. Formulated as the calcium salt, it is used as a pharmaceutical drug in the Russian Federation for a variety of neurological, psychological and psychiatric conditions and sold as Pantogam (Russian: Пантогам).

== Chemistry ==
Hopantenic acid is a homologue of pantothenic acid. While pantothenic acid is the amide of D-pantoate and β-alanine, hopantenic acid is the amide of D-pantoate and γ-aminobutyric acid (GABA). This change leads to an additional CH_{2} in the molecule.

== See also ==
- Methyl pentanoate
- Menthyl isovalerate
- List of Russian drugs
