= Gamma-glutamyl-gamma-aminobutyrate hydrolase =

Class of enzymes

Identifiers
- EC no.: 3.5.1.94

Databases
- BRENDA: enzyme data
- ExPASy: NiceZyme view
- KEGG: enzyme entry
- MetaCyc: metabolic pathway
- Rhea: reactions
- PDB structures: RCSB PDB PDBe PDBsum
- Gene Ontology: AmiGO / QuickGO
Search
- PMC: articles
- PubMed: articles
- NCBI: proteins

Gamma-glutamyl-gamma-aminobutyrate hydrolase (EC 3.5.1.94) is an enzyme characterised from Escherichia coli that catalyzes the hydrolysis of 4-(γ-glutamylamino)butanoic acid to γ-aminobutyric acid (GABA) and L-glutamic acid:

4-(γ-Glutamylamino)butanoic acid
H_{2}O
GABA
+
L-glutamic acid

The reaction is part of a pathway that allows bacteria to metabolise putrescine. In potato, the enzyme regulates the amount of GABA present in response to stress.

This enzyme is a hydrolase, one acting on carbon-nitrogen bonds other than peptide bonds, specifically in linear amides. The systematic name of this enzyme class is 4-(gamma-glutamylamino)butanoate amidohydrolase. Other names in use include gamma-glutamyl-GABA hydrolase, PuuD, and YcjL.
