= Pantoic acid =

Names
- Preferred IUPAC name (2R)-2,4-Dihydroxy-3,3-dimethylbutanoic acid
- Other names D-Pantoic acid; D-Pantoate; B(R)-2,4-dihydroxy-3,3-dimethylbutanoic acid

Identifiers
CAS Number	1112-33-0
3D model (JSmol)	Interactive image
ChemSpider	388387
PubChem CID	439251
UNII	0J1TL6G6J9
CompTox Dashboard (EPA)	DTXSID70861968 DTXSID90963716, DTXSID70861968
- InChI: InChI=1S/C6H12O4/c1-6(2,3-7)4(8)5(9)10/h4,7-8H,3H2,1-2H3,(H,9,10)/t4-/m0/s1 Key: OTOIIPJYVQJATP-BYPYZUCNSA-N
- SMILES: O=C(O)[C@H](O)C(C)(C)CO

Properties
Chemical formula	C_{6}H_{12}O_{4}
Molar mass	148.158 g·mol^{−1}
- Except where otherwise noted, data are given for materials in their standard state (at 25 °C [77 °F], 100 kPa). Infobox references

Pantoic acid is the alpha hydroxy acid with the formula HOCH_{2}C(CH_{3})_{2}CH(OH)CO_{2}H. The compound is almost always encountered in a biological context, as an aqueous solution of its conjugate base pantoate HOCH_{2}C(CH_{3})_{2}CH(OH)CO_{2}-. The amide of pantoic acid with β-alanine is pantothenic acid (vitamin B_{5}), a component of coenzyme A.

== Biosynthesis ==
Its biosynthesis proceeds from ketoisovalerate by hydroxymethylation:

(CH_{3})_{2}CHC(O)CO_{2}^{−} + CH_{2}O → HOCH_{2}(CH_{3})_{2}CC(O)CO_{2}^{−}

This conversion is catalyzed by ketopantoate hydroxymethyltransferase, which gives ketopantoic acid. This compound is reduced by ketopantoate reductase to (R)-pantoic acid, using NADPH as the hydride source.

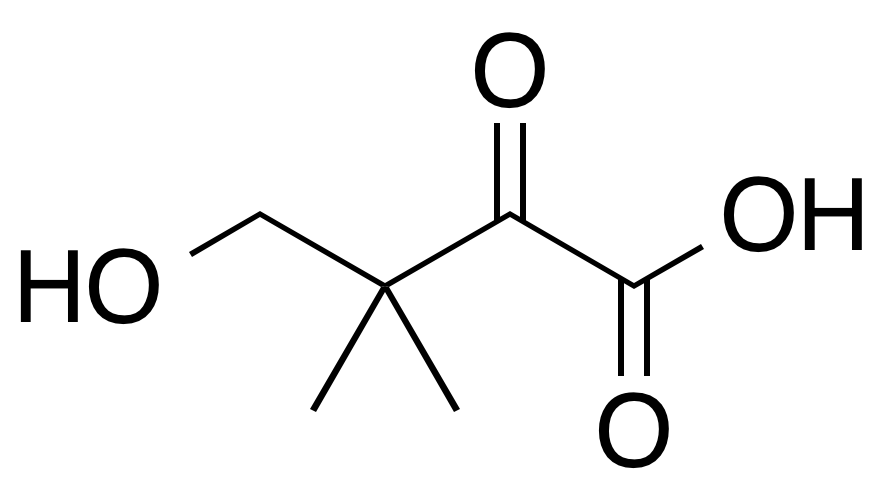
ketopantoic acid
+ NADPH
H^{+}
H^{+}
(R)-pantoic acid
+ NADP^{+}

The amide derived from pantoic acid and GABA is the pharmaceutical drug hopantenic acid.
