= Phosphopantothenoylcysteine decarboxylase =

Class of enzymes

Identifiers
- EC no.: 4.1.1.36
- CAS no.: 9024-69-5

Databases
- BRENDA: enzyme data
- ExPASy: NiceZyme view
- KEGG: enzyme entry
- MetaCyc: metabolic pathway
- Rhea: reactions
- PDB structures: RCSB PDB PDBe PDBsum
- Gene Ontology: AmiGO / QuickGO
Search
- PMC: articles
- PubMed: articles
- NCBI: proteins

Phosphopantothenoylcysteine decarboxylase (EC 4.1.1.36) is a carboxy-lyase enzyme that catalyzes the decarboxylation of N-[(R)-4'-phosphopantothenoyl]-L-cysteine to phosphopantetheine and carbon dioxide:

N-[(R)-4'-phosphopantothenoyl]-L-cysteine
CO_{2}
phosphopantetheine

The enzyme has lysine and histidine groups at its active site, and is part of the biosynthetic pathway to coenzyme A.

The systematic name of this enzyme class is N-[(R)-4'-phosphopantothenoyl]-L-cysteine carboxy-lyase (pantotheine-4'-phosphate-forming). Other names in use include 4-phosphopantotheoylcysteine decarboxylase, 4-phosphopantothenoyl-L-cysteine decarboxylase, PPC-decarboxylase, and N-[(R)-4'-phosphopantothenoyl]-L-cysteine carboxy-lyase.

== Structural studies ==
As of late 2007, 3 structures have been solved for this class of enzymes, with PDB accession codes PDB: 1MVL, PDB: 1MVN, and PDB: 1QZU.

== See also ==
- Pantothenoylcysteine decarboxylase, which catalyses the same reaction of a non-phosphorylated substrate, giving pantetheine
