= Alexander E. Braunstein =

Soviet biochemist (1902–1986)

Alexander Braunstein
- Born: Alexander Yevseyevich Braunstein; May 26, 1902; Kharkov, Kiev Governorate, Russian Empire
- Died: July 1, 1986 (aged 84); Moscow, Russian SFSR, Soviet Union
- Citizenship: Soviet Union
- Known for: Studies of enzymatic transamination and vitamin B6
- Scientific career
- Fields: Biochemistry, enzymology
- Doctoral advisor: Vladimir Engelgardt

Alexander Yevseyevich Braunstein (1902–1986) was a Soviet biochemist. He is best known for his co-discovery, along with Maria Kritzman, of enzymatic transamination and its dependence on vitamin B6. Braunstein and American scientist Esmond Emerson Snell have been cited as the "fathers of vitamin B6".

== Early life and education ==
Braunstein was born in Kharkiv (then Kharkov), Ukraine in 1902. His father was an ophthalmologist. In his early education, he displayed a facility for learning languages, became interested in studying chemistry, and eventually began to study medicine in 1920 at the Kharkov State Medical Institute. He then moved to Moscow and received his Ph.D. under the supervision of Vladimir Engelgardt in 1928.

== Academic career ==
Braunstein spent his early scientific career at the People's Commissariat of Health. In 1936, he moved to the A. M. Gorky Institute of Experimental Medicine. In 1945, after the end of World War II, he assumed leadership of a laboratory at the Institute of Biological and Medical Chemistry, under the auspices of the then-new USSR Academy of Medical Sciences. In 1959, when his former Ph.D. advisor Engelhardt founded a new Institute of Radiation and Physico-Chemical Biology (later the Institute of Molecular Biology), Braunstein headed a laboratory there.

== Research ==
Braunstein's best-known work centered on enzymatic transamination and the role of vitamin B_{6} (specifically, in its pyridoxal phosphate form) as a cofactor in these reactions. Along with Maria Kritzman, Braunstein co-discovered the phenomenon of transamination and described its biological significance in a series of papers beginning in 1937. Later, Braunstein's and Esmond Emerson Snell's research groups independently described a general catalytic mechanism for enzymes dependent on the biologically active form of vitamin B6, known as pyridoxal phosphate (PLP), as a cofactor. In his later career, Braunstein focused on X-ray crystallography, attempting to solve the structure of transaminase enzymes.

After his death, Braunstein was recognized by colleagues for his scientific leadership. His skill with languages was remembered as facilitating international meetings throughout his career, at a time when English was less established as the common language of scientific discourse. As well as publishing in both Russian- and English-language scientific journals, Braunstein also translated scientific works.

== Awards and honors ==
- Stalin Prize in Science and Technology (1941)
- Member, USSR Academy of Medical Sciences (1945)
- Member, German National Academy of Sciences Leopoldina (1958)
- Foreign Honorary Member, American Academy of Arts and Sciences (1961)
- Full Member, Academy of Sciences of the Soviet Union (1964)
- Hero of Socialist Labour (1972)
- Order of Lenin (1972)
- Foreign Member, National Academy of Sciences (1974)
- Lenin Prize (1980)
- Three Orders of the Red Banner of Labour

In recognition of his contributions to the study of vitamin B6 biochemistry, the 1987 meeting in a regular series of international symposia on pyridoxal catalysis was dedicated to Braunstein's memory.
