= Pantethine =

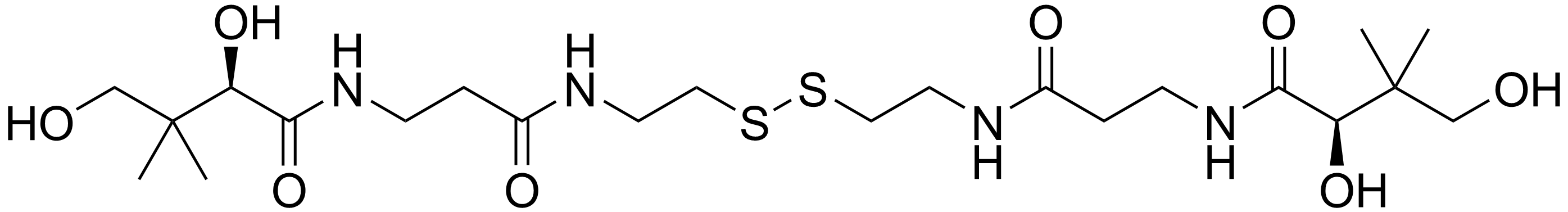

Names
- Systematic IUPAC name (2R,2′R)-N,N′-(3,12-Dioxo-7,8-dithia-4,11-diazatetradecane-1,14-diyl)bis(2,4-dihydroxy-3,3-dimethylbutanamide)
- Other names Bis-pantethine; Co-enzyme pantethine

Identifiers
CAS Number	16816-67-4
3D model (JSmol)	Interactive image
ChEMBL	ChEMBL2104786
ChemSpider	4515
ECHA InfoCard	100.037.114
PubChem CID	4677
UNII	7K81IL792L
CompTox Dashboard (EPA)	DTXSID9046815
- InChI: InChI=1S/C22H42N4O8S2/c1-21(2,13-27)17(31)19(33)25-7-5-15(29)23-9-11-35-36-12-10-24-16(30)6-8-26-20(34)18(32)22(3,4)14-28/h17-18,27-28,31-32H,5-14H2,1-4H3,(H,23,29)(H,24,30)(H,25,33)(H,26,34) Key: DJWYOLJPSHDSAL-UHFFFAOYSA-N; InChI=1/C22H42N4O8S2/c1-21(2,13-27)17(31)19(33)25-7-5-15(29)23-9-11-35-36-12-10-24-16(30)6-8-26-20(34)18(32)22(3,4)14-28/h17-18,27-28,31-32H,5-14H2,1-4H3,(H,23,29)(H,24,30)(H,25,33)(H,26,34) Key: DJWYOLJPSHDSAL-UHFFFAOYAZ
- SMILES: O=C(NCCSSCCNC(=O)CCNC(=O)C(O)C(C)(C)CO)CCNC(=O)C(O)C(C)(C)CO

Properties
Chemical formula	C_{22}H_{42}N_{4}O_{8}S_{2}
Molar mass	554.72 g·mol^{−1}

Pharmacology
ATC code	A11HA32 (WHO)

Hazards
NFPA 704 (fire diamond)	2 1 0
- Except where otherwise noted, data are given for materials in their standard state (at 25 °C [77 °F], 100 kPa). verify (what is ?) Infobox references

Pantethine (bis-pantethine or co-enzyme pantethine) is a dimeric form of pantetheine, which is produced from pantothenic acid (vitamin B_{5}) by the addition of cysteamine. Pantethine was discovered by Gene Brown, a PhD student at the time. Pantethine is two molecules of pantetheine linked by a disulfide bridge. Pantetheine is an intermediate in the production of coenzyme A by the body. Most vitamin B_{5} supplements are in the form of calcium pantothenate, a salt of pantothenic acid, with doses in the range of 5 to 10 mg/day. In contrast, pantethine is sold as a dietary supplement for lowering blood cholesterol and triglycerides at doses of 500 to 1200 mg/day.

== Dietary supplement ==
Pantethine is available in the United States as a dietary supplement because of evidence for lowering elevated LDL-cholesterol and triglycerides and raising HDL-cholesterol. In multiple clinical trials of patients with elevated cholesterol and triglycerides, total and LDL cholesterol were decreased by an average of 12%, triglycerides decreased by 19%, and HDL cholesterol was increased by 9% in clinical trials with daily intakes ranging from 600 to 1200 mg/day.

== Physiological effects ==
Although pantethine can serve as a precursor for generation of vitamin B_{5} and consumption of therapeutic amounts of pantethine results in higher circulating concentrations of vitamin B_{5}, this is not thought to be the mechanism of action. Vitamin B_{5} requirements are on the order of 5 mg/day. High doses of vitamin B_{5} do not result in the lipid changes seen with pantethine. Two mechanisms of action are proposed for pantethine. In the first, pantethine serves as the precursor for synthesis of coenzyme A. CoA is involved in the transfer of acetyl groups, in some instances to attach to proteins closely associated with activating and deactivating genes. By this theory, either the genes responsible for cholesterol and triglyceride synthesis are suppressed or the genes governing the catabolism of compounds are turned on. In the second theory, pantethine is converted to two pantetheine molecules which are in turn metabolized to form two pantothenic acid and two cysteamine molecules. Cysteamine is theorized to bind to and thus inactivate sulfur-containing amino acids in liver enzymes involved in the production of cholesterol and triglycerides. What is known is that high doses of the related vitamin - pantothenic acid - has no effect on lipids.
