= Esmond Emerson Snell =

American biochemist

- Born: September 22, 1914; Salt Lake City, Utah
- Died: December 9, 2003 (aged 89); Boulder, Colorado
- Resting place: El Cerrito, California
- Citizenship: American
- Education: University of Wisconsin, Madison
- Known for: Discovery of folic acid, pyridoxal catalysis, and other vitamins and growth factors
- Scientific career
- Fields: Biochemistry
- Institutions: University of Texas at Austin; University of Wisconsin–Madison; University of California, Berkeley
- Doctoral advisor: William Harold Peterson
- Doctoral students: Edith Wilson Miles, Harry P. Broquist

Signature
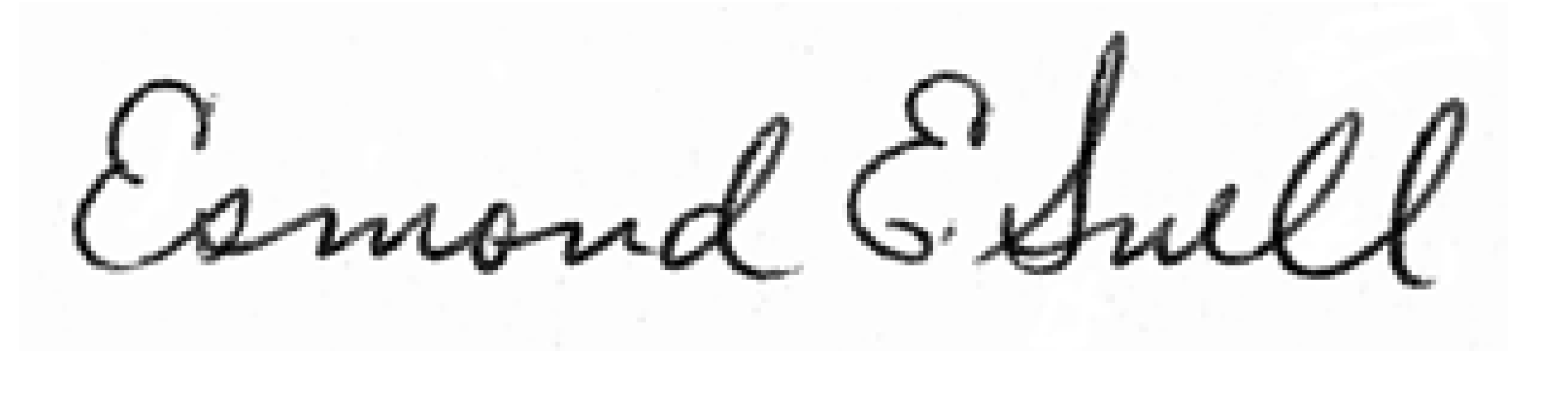

Esmond Emerson Snell (September 22, 1914 – December 9, 2003) was an American biochemist who spent his career researching vitamins and nutritional requirements of bacteria and yeast. He is well known for his study of lactic acid-producing bacteria, developing microbiological assays for a number of key nutrients; the discovery of more than half of known vitamins has been attributed to the use of this work. He discovered several B vitamins, including folic acid, and characterized the biochemistry of vitamin B_{6} (also known as pyrixodal).

== Early life and education ==
The fourth of five children, Snell was born in 1914 in Salt Lake City, Utah to parents who met while serving as Mormon missionaries. The family moved several times in Wyoming and Utah before settling in Provo, Utah so that the children could attend Brigham Young University. Snell became interested in chemistry during high school and went on to study chemistry at BYU; he also – "reluctantly", as he remembered later – studied secondary education as "insurance" against the unemployment of the Great Depression. After graduation, he received a scholarship to continue his studies at the University of Wisconsin–Madison, where he joined the research group of William Harold Peterson and began his long career studying nutrition and metabolism in microorganisms. Snell received his PhD in biochemistry in 1938 and moved to the University of Texas at Austin, where he worked as a postdoctoral fellow with Roger J. Williams.

== Academic career ==
Snell began his independent research career with an appointment as an assistant professor of chemistry at the University of Texas at Austin in 1941, advancing to associate professor in 1943. He then moved back to his alma mater in 1945, joining the biochemistry faculty of the University of Wisconsin and remaining there until 1951, when he returned to Austin to occupy newly constructed laboratory space. In 1956 he was offered the chairmanship of the biochemistry department at the University of California, Berkeley, and relocated his laboratory there. He served as chair until 1956 and remained in the department until 1976, departing briefly for sabbatical visits to Feodor Lynen's research group in Munich, Germany and later to Osaka University in 1971. After 20 years at Berkeley, Snell again returned to Austin for family reasons and became the chair of the microbiology department there for the following four years. Snell became the Ashbel Smith Professor of Chemistry in 1980 and retired, assuming professor emeritus status, in 1990.

During his career Snell served on a number of scientific journal editorial boards, most notably as the editor of the Annual Review of Biochemistry from 1968 to 1983 and of Biochemical and Biophysical Research Communications from 1970 to 1985.

== Research ==
Snell is widely recognized as one of the foremost nutritional biochemists of the 20th century. His early work developing microbiological assays for key nutrients has been credited with facilitating the discovery of at least half of known vitamins due to their ease of use compared to more traditional animal studies. His 1939 publication describing a microbiological assay for riboflavin – then one of just two B vitamins known – is considered the first widely used such assay. His notable discoveries using these methods include the discovery and naming of folic acid, which Herschel K. Mitchell, Snell, and Roger J. Williams isolated from four tons of processed spinach and demonstrated to be a growth factor for the experimental organism Streptococcus faecalis. A version of Snell's microbiological assay method based on the experimental organism Lactobacillus casei (now known as Lactobacillus rhamnosus) is still used as a method for detecting folates in blood.

Snell's interest in isolating and characterizing unknown nutrients and growth factors also led to the serendipitous discovery of useful biochemical tools. While working to characterize the yeast growth factor that would become known as biotin, Snell and coworkers discovered the egg white protein avidin, which binds biotin with extremely high affinity. At the time avidin was noted as a cause of "egg white injury", a form of biotin deficiency in animals. The rarity and expense of obtaining biotin at the time limited further investigations, but the extremely high avidin-biotin binding affinity was later exploited and is now widely used in molecular biology for purification and molecular detection applications.

Snell is perhaps best known for his work on vitamin B_{6}, work he conducted at Texas with Beverly Guirard, a long time associate in his lab. He and Soviet scientist Alexander E. Braunstein have been cited as the "fathers of vitamin B_{6}". Snell discovered two novel forms of the substance – pyridoxal and pyridoxamine – and thus elaborated the underlying biochemistry of enzymes that rely on pyridoxal cofactors for catalysis. In a series of experiments beginning in the 1940s and later conducted with student David Metzler, a general mechanism for the catalytic cycle of pyridoxal-dependent enzymes was discovered. Recalling his own work with pyridoxal, French biophysicist Michel E. Goldberg described Snell as "the pope of pyridoxal catalysis".

== Awards and honors ==
Snell received a number of honors during his long career.

- Eli Lilly Award in Bacteriology and Immunology (1945)
- Member, National Academy of Sciences (1955)
- Member, American Academy of Arts and Sciences (1962)
- Fellow, American Institute of Nutrition (1982)
- William C. Rose Award (1985)

In recognition of his contributions to the study of vitamin B_{6} biochemistry, the 1999 meeting in a regular series of international symposia on pyridoxal catalysis was dedicated to Snell.

== Personal life ==
While working at the University of Texas, Snell met his wife Mary, then a senior chemistry major. The couple married in 1941 and had four children, three sons and a daughter. They would return to the Austin, Texas area for family reasons twice during Snell's career. Mary died in 2003 after 62 years of marriage, while Snell died of prostate cancer and congestive heart failure at age 89, only six days after his wife's death. They were survived by three of their four children; one son was killed in action in 1968 during the Vietnam War. The Snells were buried alongside their son in El Cerrito, California.
