= Fritz Albert Lipmann =

German-American biochemist

Fritz Albert Lipmann ForMemRS
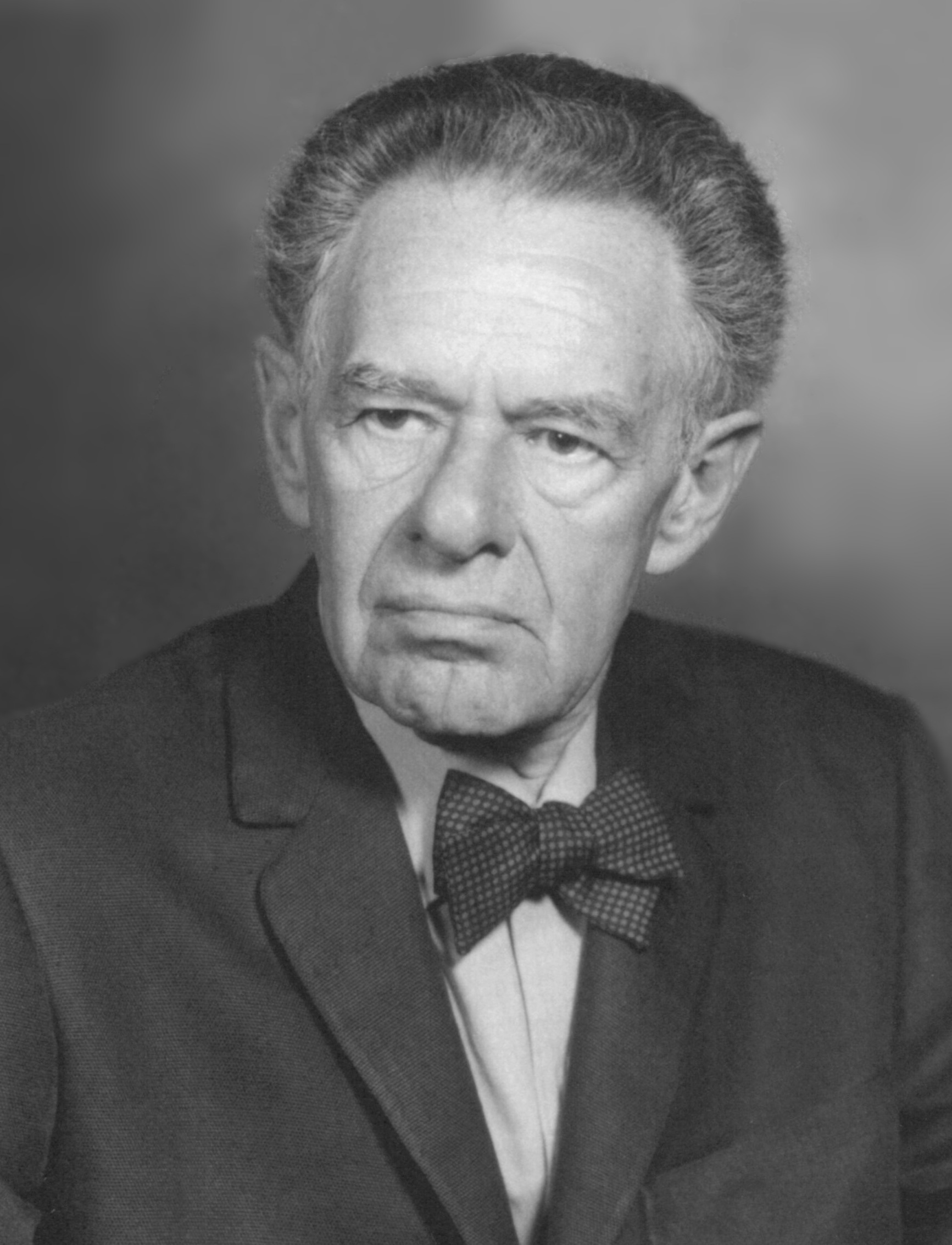
- Born: June 12, 1899; Königsberg, German Empire (present-day Kaliningrad, Russia)
- Died: July 24, 1986 (aged 87); Poughkeepsie, New York, U.S.
- Other name: Fritz Lippmann
- Education: University of Königsberg; Friedrich Wilhelm University of Berlin; Ludwig-Maximilians-Universität München; Kaiser Wilhelm Institute for Biology
- Known for: Co-discoverer in 1945 of coenzyme A
- Spouse: Elfreda M. Hall Lipmann (m. 1931)
- Children: 1
- Awards: Nobel Prize in Physiology or Medicine (1953); National Medal of Science (1966)
- Scientific career
- Fields: Biochemistry
- Workplaces: Kaiser Wilhelm Institute for Medical Research; Massachusetts General Hospital; Harvard Medical School; The Rockefeller University

Fritz Albert Lipmann (German pronunciation: [fʁɪts ˈʔalbɛʁt ˈlɪpman]; June 12, 1899 – July 24, 1986) was a German-American biochemist and a co-discoverer in 1945 of coenzyme A. For this, together with other research on coenzyme A, he was awarded the Nobel Prize in Physiology or Medicine in 1953 (shared with Hans Adolf Krebs).

== Early life and education ==
Lipmann was born in Königsberg, Germany, to a Jewish family. His parents were Gertrud (Lachmanski) and Leopold Lipmann, an attorney.

Lipmann studied medicine at the University of Königsberg, the Friedrich Wilhelm University of Berlin, and the Ludwig-Maximilians-Universität München, graduating at the Friedrich Wilhelm University of Berlin in 1924. He returned to the University of Königsberg to study chemistry under Professor Hans Meerwein. In 1926, he joined Otto Meyerhof at the Kaiser Wilhelm Institute for Biology, Dahlem, Berlin, for his doctoral thesis. After that he followed Meyerhof to Heidelberg to the Kaiser Wilhelm Institute for Medical Research.

== Career ==
From 1939 on, Lipmann lived and worked in the United States. He was a Research Associate in the Department of Biochemistry, Cornell University Medical College, New York from 1939 to 1941. He joined the research staff of the Massachusetts General Hospital in Boston in 1941, first as a Research Associate in the Department of Surgery, then heading his own group in the Biochemical Research Laboratory of the hospital. From 1949 to 1957 he was professor of biological chemistry at Harvard Medical School. From 1957 onwards, he taught and conducted research at Rockefeller University, New York City.

In 1953, Lipmann received one half of the Nobel Prize in Physiology and Medicine "for his discovery of co-enzyme A and its importance for intermediary metabolism." The other half of the award was won by Hans Adolf Krebs. Lipmann was awarded the National Medal of Science in 1966. He would try to dive further into his discovery by finding a variant of co-enzyme A, now known as Pantethine. He was an elected member of the American Academy of Arts and Sciences, the United States National Academy of Sciences, and the American Philosophical Society.

Lipmann introduced the specific squiggle designation (~) to indicate high energy-rich phosphate in energy-rich biomolecules like ATP in his essay "Metabolic Generation and Utilization of Phosphate Bond Energy." Of his work, he said "that in the field of biosynthesis we have a rare example of progress leading to simplification."

== Personal life ==
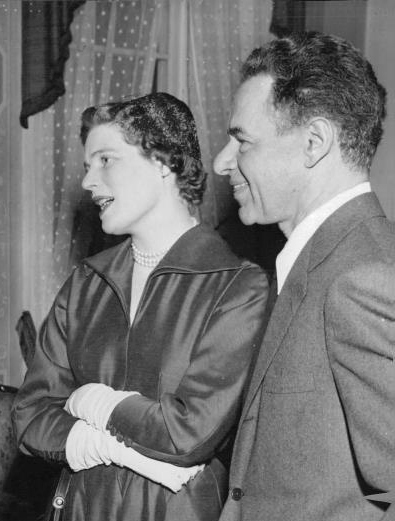
Lipmann with Mary Soames in Stockholm in 1953

In 1931, Lipmann married Elfreda M. Hall. They had one son. Lipmann died in New York in 1986. The photo shows Mary Soames, not Elfreda Hall Lipmann His widow died in 2008 at the age of 101.

== See also ==
- List of Jewish Nobel laureates
- Hans Adolf Krebs
