= Pantetheine-phosphate adenylyltransferase =

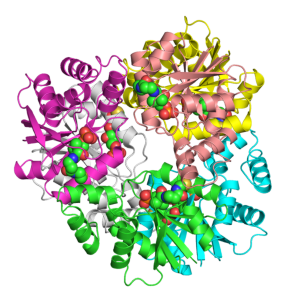
- Phosphopantetheine adenylyltransferase from Thermotoga maritima. 4'-Phosphopantetheine shown as spheres. PDB 1VLH

Identifiers
- EC no.: 2.7.7.3
- CAS no.: 9026-99-7

Databases
- IntEnz: IntEnz view
- BRENDA: BRENDA entry
- ExPASy: NiceZyme view
- KEGG: KEGG entry
- MetaCyc: metabolic pathway
- PRIAM: profile
- PDB structures: RCSB PDB PDBe PDBsum
- Gene Ontology: AmiGO / QuickGO
Search
- PMC: articles
- PubMed: articles
- NCBI: proteins

Pantetheine-phosphate adenylyltransferase (EC 2.7.7.3) is an enzyme that catalyzes the penultimate step in the biosynthesis of coenzyme A. It combines adenosine triphosphate and phosphopantetheine to give 3'-dephospho-Coenzyme A, with inorganic pyrophosphate (PP_{i}) as a byproduct:

adenosine triphosphate
+
phosphopantetheine
PP_{i}
3'-dephospho-Coenzyme A

The enzyme has been characterised from Brevibacterium ammoniagenes and Escherichia coli. The final step to coenzyme A is catalysed by dephospho-CoA kinase.

== Nomenclature ==
The enzyme is a transferase, specifically one transferring phosphorus-containing nucleotide groups (nucleotidyltransferases). The systematic name of this enzyme class is ATP:pantetheine-4'-phosphate adenylyltransferase. Other names in common use include dephospho-CoA pyrophosphorylase, pantetheine phosphate adenylyltransferase, dephospho-coenzyme A pyrophosphorylase, and 3'-dephospho-CoA pyrophosphorylase.

== Structural studies ==
As of late 2007, 8 structures have been solved for this class of enzymes, with Protein Data Bank accession codes PDB: 1B6T, PDB: 1GN8, PDB: 1H1T, PDB: 1O6B, PDB: 1OD6, PDB: 1QJC, PDB: 1TFU, and PDB: 1VLH.
