= Pantetheine =

- Stereo, skeletal formula of pantetheine (R)

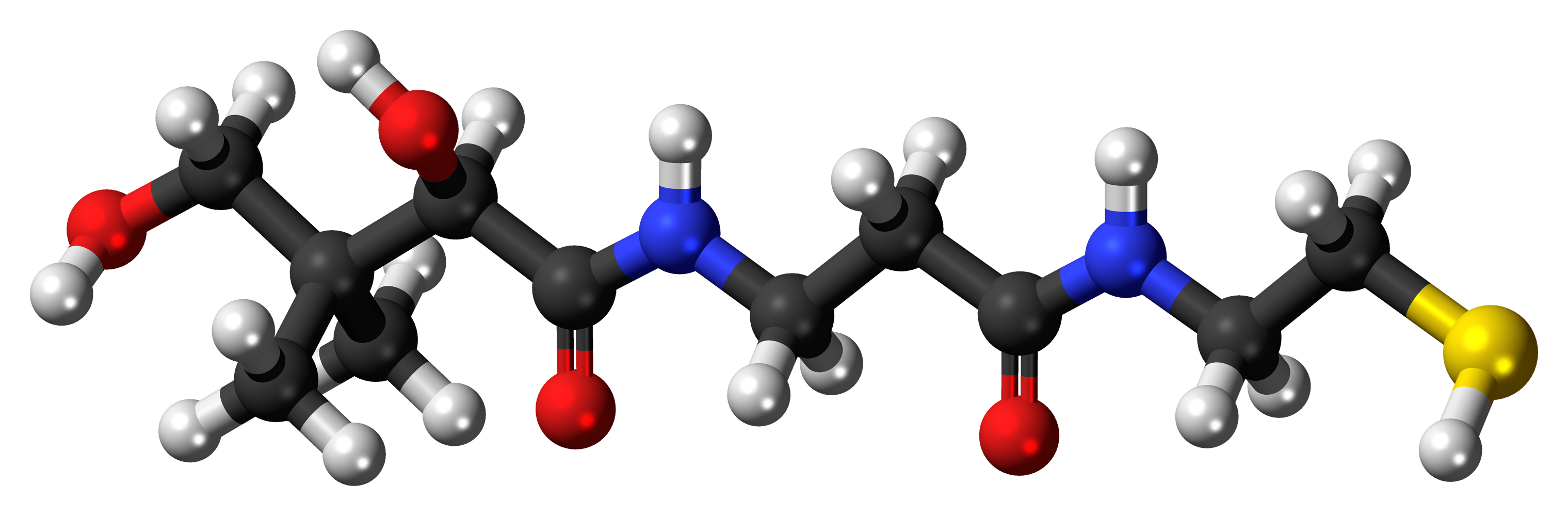

Names
- Systematic IUPAC name (2R)-2,4-Dihydroxy-3,3-dimethyl-N-{3-oxo-3-[(2-sulfanylethyl)amino]propyl}butanamide
- Other names Pantetheine

Identifiers
CAS Number	496-65-1 R
3D model (JSmol)	Interactive image
Beilstein Reference	1714196 R
ChEBI	CHEBI:16753
ChemSpider	466; 388453 R
ECHA InfoCard	100.007.114
EC Number	207-824-1
KEGG	C00831
MeSH	Pantetheine
PubChem CID	479; 439322 R
UNII	VCH6X4IARE R
- InChI: InChI=1S/C11H22N2O4S/c1-11(2,7-14)9(16)10(17)13-4-3-8(15)12-5-6-18/h9,14,16,18H,3-7H2,1-2H3,(H,12,15)(H,13,17) Key: ZNXZGRMVNNHPCA-UHFFFAOYSA-N
- SMILES: CC(C)(CO)C(O)C(=O)NCCC(=O)NCCS

Properties
Chemical formula	C_{11}H_{22}N_{2}O_{4}S
Molar mass	278.37 g·mol^{−1}

Related compounds
Related compounds	Pantethine
- Except where otherwise noted, data are given for materials in their standard state (at 25 °C [77 °F], 100 kPa). verify (what is ?) Infobox references

Pantetheine is the cysteamine amide analog of pantothenic acid (vitamin B_{5}). The dimer of this compound, pantethine is more commonly known, and is considered to be the most potent form of vitamin B_{5}. Pantetheine is an intermediate in the catabolism of coenzyme A by the body.

== Metabolism ==
Pantetheine is the product of dephosphorylation of phosphopantetheine:

phosphopantetheine → pantetheine + P_{i}

In E. coli, this reaction is catalyzed by for example alkaline phosphatase. The reverse reaction, phosphopantetheine synthesis, is catalyzed by various kinases:

phosphopantetheine + ATP → pantetheine + ADP

These kinases are able to act upon pantothenoic acid as well and are present in both microorganisms and animal livers.

Pantetheine is degraded by pantetheinase, which splits it into cysteamine and pantothenic acid:

pantetheine → cysteamine + pantothenate

== Prebiotic evolution ==
Since pantetheine is a part of coenzyme A, a common cofactor, it is thought to have been present in prebiotic soup. A synthesis mechanism has also been suggested. Pantetheine may also be a component in prebiotic peptidyl-RNA synthesis.
