= 4-(γ-Glutamylamino)butanoic acid =

- Stereo, skeletal formula of 4-(γ-glutamylamino)butanoic acid (S)

Names
- Preferred IUPAC name 2-Amino-5-[(4-hydroxy-4-oxobutyl)amino]-5-oxopentanoic acid
- Systematic IUPAC name 4-Amino-5-((3-carboxypropyl)amino)-5-oxopentanoic acid
- Other names: 2-Amino-5-(3-carboxypropylamino)-5-oxopentanoic acid; 4-(Glutam-5-ylamino)butanoic acid; γ-Glutamyl-γ-aminobutyric acid

Identifiers
| CAS Number | 5105-96-4 S |
| 3D model (JSmol) | Interactive image |
| Abbreviations | Glutamyl-GABA; Glu-GABA; γ-Glutamyl-GABA; γ-Glu-γ-Abu |
| Beilstein Reference | 2418119 |
| ChEBI | CHEBI:49260 |
| ChEMBL | ChEMBL269574 |
| ChemSpider | 315618 |
| KEGG | C15767 |
| PubChem CID | 355553; 23724570 S |
| CompTox Dashboard (EPA) | DTXSID901028848 DTXSID90965336, DTXSID901028848 |
- InChI: InChI=1S/C9H16N2O5/c10-6(9(15)16)3-4-7(12)11-5-1-2-8(13)14/h6H,1-5,10H2,(H,11,12)(H,13,14)(H,15,16) Key: MKYPKZSGLSOGLL-UHFFFAOYSA-N
- SMILES: NC(CCC(=O)NCCCC(O)=O)C(O)=O

Properties
| Chemical formula | C_{9}H_{16}N_{2}O_{5} |
| Molar mass | 232.236 g·mol^{−1} |
| log P | −1.434 |
| Acidity (pK_{a}) | 2.223 |
| Basicity (pK_{b}) | 11.777 |

Related compounds
| Related alkanoic acids | Hopantenic acid; Hypusine; Saccharopine |
- Except where otherwise noted, data are given for materials in their standard state (at 25 °C [77 °F], 100 kPa). verify (what is ?) Infobox references

4-(γ-Glutamylamino)butanoic acid is a molecule that consists of L-glutamate conjugated to γ-aminobutyric acid (GABA). It is the substrate of the enzyme γ-glutamyl-γ-aminobutyrate hydrolase, which is involved in the biosynthesis of polyamines.
