= Pioneer, Missouri =

Unincorporated community in Missouri, U.S.

Coordinates: 36°50′09″N 94°03′18″W

Pioneer is an unincorporated community in Barry County, Missouri, United States.

== History ==
A post office called Pioneer was established in 1883, and remained in operation until 1934. The community was named for the local pioneer settlers.
