= Aminomethyl group =

Functional group

Aminomethyl group

In organic chemistry, an aminomethyl group is a monovalent functional group with formula −CH_{2}−NH_{2}. It can be described as a methyl group substituted by an amino group −NH_{2}. Commonly aminomethylations are the result of a Mannich reaction.

== Related compounds ==
Usually aminomethyl groups feature tertiary amines. Often they are obtained by alkylation with Eschenmoser's salt, a source of [CH_{2}=N(CH_{3})_{2}]^{+}..

A cobalt(III) complex of aminomethyl is known in the form [Co(bipyridine)_{2}(CH_{2}NH_{2})](ClO^{4})_{2}.

Aminomethyl is the first member of a series of 1-aminoalkyl groups of the form −(CH_{2}−)_{n}NH_{2}.

Aminomethyl is used in the standard (IUPAC) names of some compounds, such as 4-(aminomethyl) benzoic acid.
