= Hydroxymethylation =

Chemical reaction

Hydroxymethylation is a chemical reaction that installs the CH_{2}OH group. The transformation can be implemented in many ways and applies to both industrial and biochemical processes.

== Hydroxymethylation with formaldehyde ==
A common method for hydroxymethylation involves the reaction of formaldehyde with active C-H and N-H bonds:

R_{3}C-H + CH_{2}O → R_{3}C-CH_{2}OH
R_{2}N-H + CH_{2}O → R_{2}N-CH_{2}OH

A typical active C-H bond is provided by a terminal acetylene or the alpha protons of an aldehyde. In industry, hydroxymethylation of acetaldehyde with formaldehyde is used in the production of pentaerythritol:

P-H bonds are also prone to reaction with formaldehyde. Tetrakis(hydroxymethyl)phosphonium chloride ([P(CH_{2}OH)_{4}]Cl) is produced in this way from phosphine (PH_{3}).

== Hydroxymethylation in demethylation ==
5-Methylcytosine is a common epigenetic marker. The methyl group is modified by oxidation of the methyl group in a process called hydroxymethylation:

RCH_{3} + O → RCH_{2}OH

This oxidation is thought to be a prelude to removal, regenerating cytosine.

== Representative reactions ==
A two-step hydroxymethylation of aldehydes involves methylenation followed by hydroboration-oxidation:

RCHO + Ph_{3}P=CH_{2} → RCH=CH_{2} + Ph_{3}PO
RCH=CH_{2} + R_{2}BH → RCH_{2}-CH_{2}BR_{2}
RCH_{2}-CH_{2}BR_{2} + H_{2}O_{2} → RCH2-CH_{2}OH + "HOBR_{2}"

Silylmethyl Grignard reagents are nucleophilic reagents for hydroxymethylation of ketones:

R_{2}C=O + ClMgCH_{2}SiR'_{3} → R_{2}C(OMgCl)CH_{2}SiR'_{3}
R_{2}C(OMgCl)CH_{2}SiR'_{3} + H_{2}O + H_{2}O_{2} → R_{2}C(OH)CH_{2}OH + "HOSiR'_{3}"

== Reactions of hydroxymethylated compounds ==
A common reaction of hydroxymethylated compounds is further reaction with a second equivalent of an active X-H bond:

hydroxymethylation: X-H + CH_{2}O → X-CH_{2}OH
crosslinking: X-H + X-CH_{2}OH → X-CH_{2}-X + H_{2}O

This pattern is illustrated by the use of formaldehyde in the production various polymers and resins from phenol-formaldehyde condensations (bakelite, novolak, and calixarenes). Similar crosslinking occurs in urea-formaldehyde resins.

The hydroxymethylation of N-H and P-H bonds can often be reversed by base. This reaction is illustrated by the preparation of tris(hydroxymethyl)phosphine:

[P(CH_{2}OH)_{4}]Cl + NaOH → P(CH_{2}OH)_{3} + H_{2}O + H_{2}C=O + NaCl

When conducted in the presence of chlorinating agents, hydroxymethylation leads to chloromethylation as illustrated by the Blanc chloromethylation.

== Related reactions ==
Hydroxymethylation is one of many hydroxyalkylations. It is more widely used because formaldehyde is more electrophilic than most aldehydes. Thus, hydroxyethylation involves the installation of the CH_{2}CH_{2}OH group, as practiced in ethoxylation.

== See also ==
- Aminomethylation, the attachment of the CH_{2}NR_{2} group
- Carboxymethylation, the attachment of the CH_{2}CO_{2}H group
