= Dephospho-CoA kinase =

Identifiers
- EC no.: 2.7.1.24
- CAS no.: 9026-83-9

Databases
- IntEnz: IntEnz view
- BRENDA: BRENDA entry
- ExPASy: NiceZyme view
- KEGG: KEGG entry
- MetaCyc: metabolic pathway
- PRIAM: profile
- PDB structures: RCSB PDB PDBe PDBsum
- Gene Ontology: AmiGO / QuickGO
Search
- PMC: articles
- PubMed: articles
- NCBI: proteins

Dephospho-CoA kinase (EC 2.7.1.24) is an enzyme that catalyzes the final chemical reaction in the biosynthesis of coenzyme A:

3'-dephospho-coenzyme A
ATP
ADP
coenzyme A

The reaction transfers a phosphate group from the cofactor, adenosine triphosphate (ATP), which is converted to adenosine diphosphate (ADP).

This enzyme is a transferases, specifically one transferring phosphorus-containing groups (phosphotransferases) with an alcohol group as acceptor. The systematic name of this enzyme class is ATP:dephospho-CoA 3'-phosphotransferase. Other names in common use include dephosphocoenzyme A kinase (phosphorylating), 3'-dephospho-CoA kinase, and dephosphocoenzyme A kinase.

== Structural studies ==
As of late 2007, 8 structures have been solved for this class of enzymes, with PDB accession codes PDB: 1JJV, PDB: 1N3B, PDB: 1T3H, PDB: 1VHL, PDB: 1VHT, PDB: 1VIY, PDB: 2GRJ, and PDB: 2IF2.
