= Α-Ketoisovaleric acid =

α-Ketoisovaleric acid

Names
- Preferred IUPAC name 3-Methyl-2-oxobutanoic acid
- Other names 2-Ketoisovaleric acid; α-Ketovaline

Identifiers
CAS Number	759-05-7
3D model (JSmol)	Interactive image
ChEBI	CHEBI:16530
ChEMBL	ChEMBL146554
ChemSpider	48
DrugBank	DB04074
ECHA InfoCard	100.010.969
KEGG	C00141
PubChem CID	49
UNII	34P71D50E0
CompTox Dashboard (EPA)	DTXSID6061078
- InChI: InChI=1S/C5H8O3/c1-3(2)4(6)5(7)8/h3H,1-2H3,(H,7,8) Key: QHKABHOOEWYVLI-UHFFFAOYSA-N; InChI=1/C5H8O3/c1-3(2)4(6)5(7)8/h3H,1-2H3,(H,7,8) Key: QHKABHOOEWYVLI-UHFFFAOYAY
- SMILES: O=C(C(=O)O)C(C)C

Properties
Chemical formula	C_{5}H_{8}O_{3}
Molar mass	116.116 g·mol^{−1}
Appearance	colorless or white solid or oil
Melting point	31.5 °C (88.7 °F; 304.6 K)
Boiling point	170.5 °C (338.9 °F; 443.6 K)
- Except where otherwise noted, data are given for materials in their standard state (at 25 °C [77 °F], 100 kPa). verify (what is ?) Infobox references

α-Ketoisovaleric acid is an organic compound with the formula (CH_{3})_{2}CHC(O)CO_{2}H. It is a ketoacid. With a melting point just above room temperature, it is usually an oil or semi-solid. The compound is colorless. It is a metabolite of valine and a precursor to pantothenic acid, a prosthetic group found in several cofactors. In the biological context, is usually encountered as its conjugate base ketoisovalerate, (CH_{3})_{2}CHC(O)CO_{2}^{−}.

== Synthesis and reactions ==
α-Ketoisovalerate undergoes hydroxymethylation to give ketopantoate:

(CH_{3})_{2}CHC(O)CO_{2}^{−} + CH_{2}O → HOCH_{2}(CH_{3})_{2}CC(O)CO_{2}^{−}

This conversion is catalyzed by ketopantoate hydroxymethyltransferase.

Like many α-ketoacids, α-ketoisovaleric acid is prone to decarboxylation to give isobutyraldehyde:

(CH_{3})_{2}CHC(O)CO_{2}H → (CH_{3})_{2}CHCHO + CO_{2}

Genetic engineering has been used to produce the biofuel isobutanol by reduction of isobutyraldehyde obtained from ketoisovalerate.

== See also ==
- α-Ketovaleric acid
