= PDPR =

Protein-coding gene in the species Homo sapiens

Identifiers
- Aliases: PDPR, PDP3, pyruvate dehydrogenase phosphatase regulatory subunit
- External IDs: OMIM: 617835; MGI: 2442188; HomoloGene: 9948; GeneCards: PDPR; OMA:PDPR - orthologs

Gene location (Human)
Chr.	Chromosome 16 (human)
Band	16q22.1	Start	70,114,332 bp
Band	16q22.1	End	70,162,537 bp

Gene location (Mouse)
Chr.	Chromosome 8 (mouse)
Band	8|8 E1	Start	111,821,262 bp
Band	8|8 E1	End	111,863,706 bp
RNA expression pattern
Bgee	Human / Mouse (ortholog); Top expressed in: secondary oocyte; nipple; parietal pleura; skin of hip; inferior ganglion of vagus nerve; renal medulla; visceral pleura; tibia; urethra; pylorus / Top expressed in: parotid gland; Rostral migratory stream; otolith organ; utricle; hand; medial head of gastrocnemius muscle; intercostal muscle; interventricular septum; foot; soleus muscle; More reference expression data
BioGPS	n/a
Gene ontology
Molecular function	[pyruvate dehydrogenase (lipoamide) phosphatase activity]; oxidoreductase activity
Cellular component	mitochondrion; mitochondrial matrix; cytoplasm
Biological process	regulation of acetyl-CoA biosynthetic process from pyruvate; protein dephosphorylation
Sources:Amigo / QuickGO
Orthologs
Species	Human	Mouse
Entrez	55066	319518
Ensembl	ENSG00000090857	ENSMUSG00000033624
UniProt	Q8NCN5	Q7TSQ8
RefSeq (mRNA)	NM_017990; NM_001322117; NM_001322118; NM_001322119	NM_198308
RefSeq (protein)	NP_001309046; NP_001309047; NP_001309048; NP_060460	NP_938050
Location (UCSC)	Chr 16: 70.11 – 70.16 Mb	Chr 8: 111.82 – 111.86 Mb
PubMed search
- Wikidata
View/Edit Human	View/Edit Mouse

Pyruvate dehydrogenase phosphatase regulatory subunit is a protein that in humans is encoded by the PDPR gene.

== Structure ==
The complete cDNA of PDPR, which contains 2885 base pairs, has an open reading frame of 2634 nucleotides encoding a putative presequence of 31 amino acid residues and a mature protein of 847. Characteristics of native PDPR include ability to decrease the sensitivity of the catalytic subunit to Mg^{2+}, and reversal of this inhibitory effect by the polyamine spermine. A BLAST search of protein databases revealed that PDPr is distantly related to the mitochondrial flavoprotein dimethylglycine dehydrogenase, which functions in choline degradation.

== Function ==
The mitochondrial pyruvate dehydrogenase complex (PDC) catalyzes the oxidative decarboxylation of pyruvate, linking glycolysis to the tricarboxylic acid cycle and fatty acid (FA) synthesis. Knowledge of the mechanisms that regulate PDC activity is important, because PDC inactivation is crucial for glucose conservation when glucose is scarce, whereas adequate PDC activity is required to allow both ATP and FA production from glucose. The mechanisms that control mammalian PDC activity include its phosphorylation (inactivation) by a family of pyruvate dehydrogenase kinases (PDKs 1–4) and its dephosphorylation (activation, reactivation) by the pyruvate dehydrogenase phosphatases (PDPs 1 and 2).

== Clinical significance ==
As PDPR is involved in the regulation of the central metabolic pathway, its participation in disease pathophysiology is likely, but there has been no published research on this thus far.
