= PDK4 =

Protein-coding gene in the species Homo sapiens

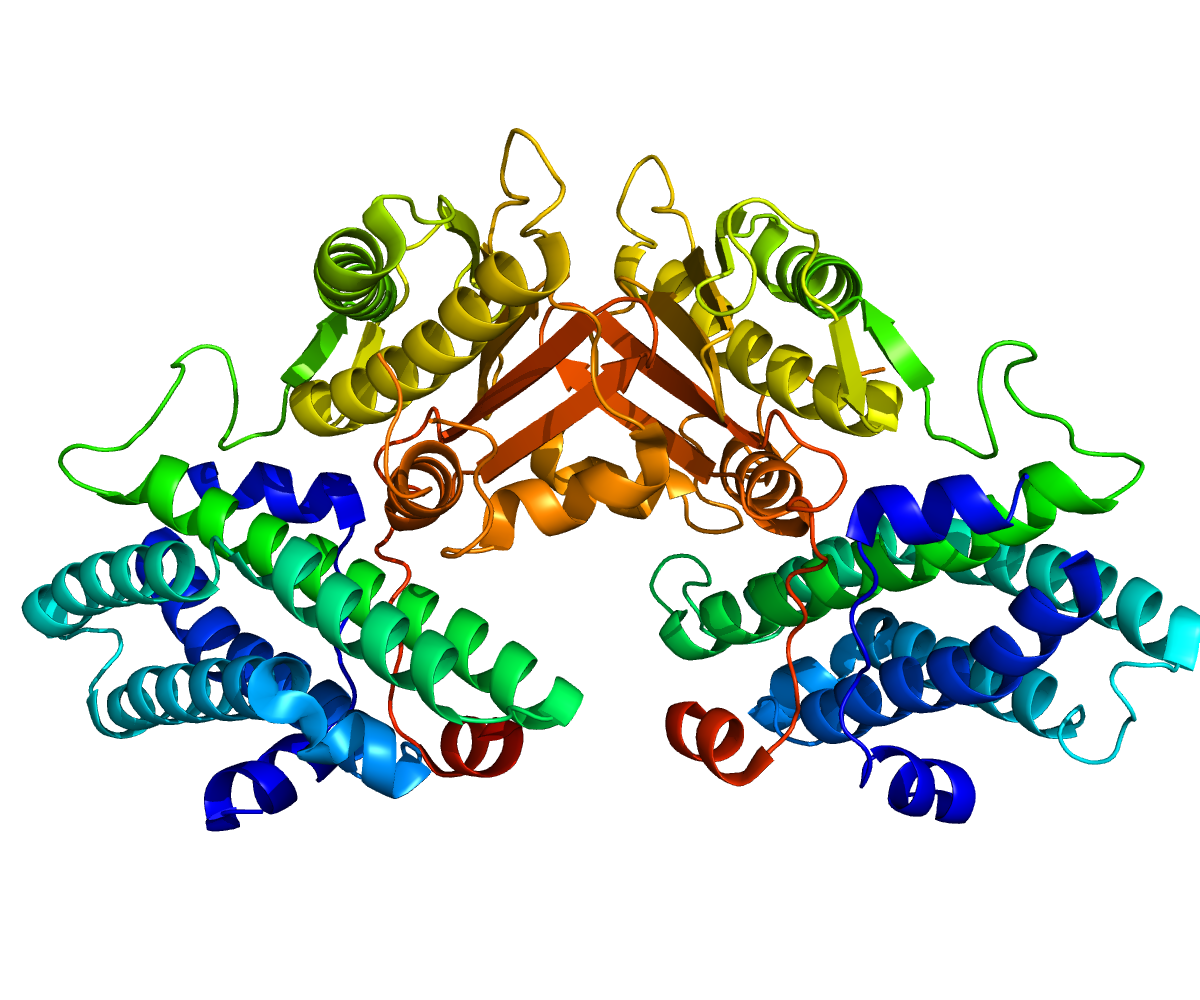

Identifiers
- Aliases: PDK4, pyruvate dehydrogenase kinase 4
- External IDs: OMIM: 602527; MGI: 1351481; GeneCards: PDK4
Available structures
PDB	Ortholog search: PDBe RCSB
PDB	List of PDB id codes 2E0A, 2ZDX, 2ZDY, 2ZKJ, 3D2R
Enzyme activity
EC #	BRENDA	ExPASy	KEGG	MetaCyc
2.7.11.2	↗	↗	↗	↗

Gene location (Human)
Chr.	Chromosome 7 (human)
Band	7q21.3	Start	95,583,499 bp
Band	7q21.3	End	95,596,516 bp

Gene location (Mouse)
Chr.	Chromosome 6 (mouse)
Band	6 A1|6 2.06 cM	Start	5,483,351 bp
Band	6 A1|6 2.06 cM	End	5,496,309 bp
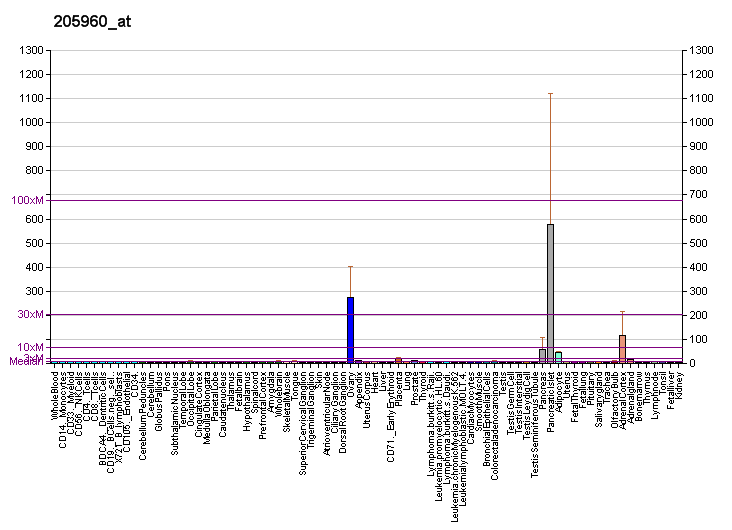
RNA expression pattern
Bgee	Human / Mouse (ortholog); Top expressed in: seminal vesicula; gastric mucosa; Skeletal muscle tissue of rectus abdominis; muscle of thigh; pericardium; right ventricle; right lung; thoracic diaphragm; left adrenal cortex; tibialis anterior muscle / Top expressed in: muscle of thigh; intercostal muscle; soleus muscle; sternocleidomastoid muscle; digastric muscle; myocardium of ventricle; plantaris muscle; temporal muscle; triceps brachii muscle; thoracic diaphragm; More reference expression data
BioGPS	More reference expression data
Gene ontology
Molecular function	transferase activity; nucleotide binding; protein kinase activity; kinase activity; ATP binding; pyruvate dehydrogenase (acetyl-transferring) kinase activity
Cellular component	mitochondrial matrix; mitochondrion
Biological process	insulin receptor signaling pathway; glucose homeostasis; regulation of fatty acid oxidation; phosphorylation; cellular response to starvation; regulation of acetyl-CoA biosynthetic process from pyruvate; regulation of fatty acid biosynthetic process; reactive oxygen species metabolic process; regulation of cellular ketone metabolic process; regulation of glucose metabolic process; cellular response to fatty acid; glucose metabolic process; response to starvation; regulation of bone resorption; negative regulation of anoikis; regulation of pH; protein phosphorylation; carbohydrate metabolic process
Sources:Amigo / QuickGO
Orthologs
Databases	NCBI: entry; OMA: entry
Species	Human	Mouse
Entrez	5166	27273
Ensembl	ENSG00000004799	ENSMUSG00000019577
UniProt	Q16654	O70571
RefSeq (mRNA)	NM_002612	NM_013743
RefSeq (protein)	NP_002603	NP_038771
Location (UCSC)	Chr 7: 95.58 – 95.6 Mb	Chr 6: 5.48 – 5.5 Mb
PubMed search
- Wikidata
View/Edit Human	View/Edit Mouse

Pyruvate dehydrogenase lipoamide kinase isozyme 4, mitochondrial (PDK4) is an enzyme that in humans is encoded by the PDK4 gene. It codes for an isozyme of pyruvate dehydrogenase kinase.

This gene is a member of the PDK/BCKDK protein kinase family and encodes a mitochondrial protein with a histidine kinase domain. This protein is located in the matrix of the mitochondria and inhibits the pyruvate dehydrogenase complex by phosphorylating one of its subunits, reducing the conversion of pyruvate, which is produced from the oxidation of glucose and amino acids, to acetyl-CoA and contributing to the regulation of glucose metabolism. Expression of this gene is regulated by glucocorticoids, retinoic acid and insulin. PDK4 is increased in hibernation and helps to decrease metabolism and conserve glucose by decreasing its conversion to acetyl-CoA, which enters the citric acid cycle and is converted to ATP.

== Structure ==
The mature protein encoded by the PDK4 gene contains 294 amino acids in its sequence. To form the active protein, two of the polypeptide chains come together to form an open conformation. Specifically, the two subunits come together to form a nucleotide-binding pocket; this pocket is targeted most often by inhibitors.

== Function ==
The pyruvate dehydrogenase (PDH) complex must be tightly regulated due to its central role in general metabolism. Within the complex, there are three serine residues on the E1 component that are sites for phosphorylation; this phosphorylation inactivates the complex. In humans, there have been four isozymes of pyruvate dehydrogenase kinase that have been shown to phosphorylate these three sites: PDK1, PDK2, PDK3, and PDK4. PDK4 does not incorporate the most phosphate groups per catalytic event, because it can only phosphorylate site 1 and site 2; its rate of phosphorylation is less than PDK1, equal to PDK3, and more than PDK2. When the thiamine pyrophosphate (TPP) coenzyme is bound, the rates of phosphorylation by all four isozymes are drastically affected. Site 1 is the most affected, with the rate being significantly decreased. However, overall activity by PDK4 is not affected.

=== Regulation ===
As the primary regulators of a crucial step in the central metabolic pathway, the pyruvate dehydrogenase family is tightly regulated itself by a myriad of factors including transcription factors Sp1 and CCAAT box binding factor (CBF). Retinoic acid enhances PDK4 transcription by enabling retinoic acid receptor family members to recruit transcriptional coactivators to retinoic acid response elements (RAREs) in the PDK4 promoter. Transcription is also increased by inhibiting inhibitory histone deacetylases (HDACs) using trichostatin A (TSA). Rosiglitazone, a thiazolidinedione known to activate the glycerol biogenesis pathway, increases PDK4 mRNA transcription in white adipose tissue, but not in liver or muscle tissue. Farnesoid X receptor, or FXR, suppresses glycolysis and enhances fatty acid oxidation by increasing PDK4 expression and inactivating the PDH complex. Other factors, such as insulin, directly downregulate both PDK2 and PDK4 mRNA transcription. This is done through a proposed phosphatidylinositol 3-kinase (PI3K)-dependent pathway. In fact, even when cells are exposed to dexamethasone to increase mRNA expression, insulin blocks this effect. Peroxisome proliferator-activated receptors also regulate expression; PPAR alpha and delta were found to upregulate PDK4 mRNA, but PPAR gamma activation downregulated expression.

== Clinical significance ==
PDK4 is relevant in a variety of clinical conditions. Short-term fasting induces an increase in PDK4 transcription by about 10-fold. Upon refeeding, transcription of PDK4 increased further, a surprising outlook, by about 50-fold over levels before fasting began. This effect can be seen long term as well. PDK4 is overexpressed in skeletal muscle in type 2 diabetes, resulting in impaired glucose utilization. In post-obese patients, there is a significant decrease in PDK4 mRNA expression, in conjunction with increased glucose uptake; this is likely due to the downregulation of PDK4 by insulin. This corroborates the concept that a lowered availability of free fatty acids affects glucose metabolism by PDH complex regulation. In fact, it has been shown that insufficient downregulation of PDK mRNA in insulin-resistant individuals could be a cause of increased PDK expression leading to impaired glucose oxidation followed by increased fatty acid oxidation.

Exercise has been shown to induce changes in this gene as well, and that transient changes can have a cumulative effect across many exercise sessions. The mRNA of PDK4, along with PPARGC1A, increases in both types of muscle tissue after exercise.

These metabolic effects can be seen in other conditions. Hypoxia is shown to induce PDK4 gene expression through the ERR gamma mechanism. Conversely, PDK4 is downregulated in cardiac muscle tissue during heart failure.

=== Cancer ===
The ubiquitous role of this gene lends itself to being involved in a variety of disease pathologies, including cancer. One metabolite, butyrate, induces hyperacetylation of the histones around the PDK4 gene. This is associated with a greater transcription level of PDK4 mRNA, thereby reversing the downregulation of PDK4 in colon carcinoma cells. In human colon cancer cells, targeting and inactivating the PDH complex limits the metabolic rate and regulates glutamine metabolism, thereby partially inhibiting cell growth. However, PDK4 has also been shown to promote tumorigenesis and proliferation through a different pathway, the CREB-RHEB-mTORC1 signaling cascade.

== Interactive pathway map ==
Click on genes, proteins and metabolites below to link to respective articles. (Note: The interactive pathway map can be edited at WikiPathways: "TCACycle_WP78".)

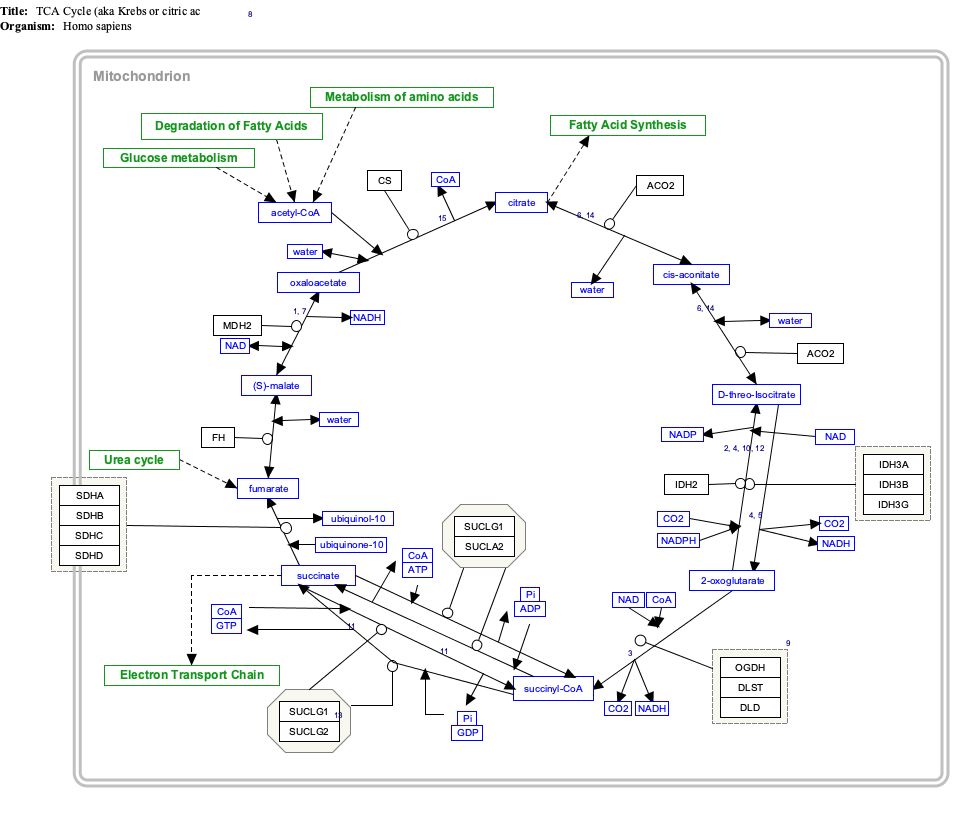

TCACycle_WP78 edit
