= Dihydrolipoyl transacetylase =

Enzyme

DLAT
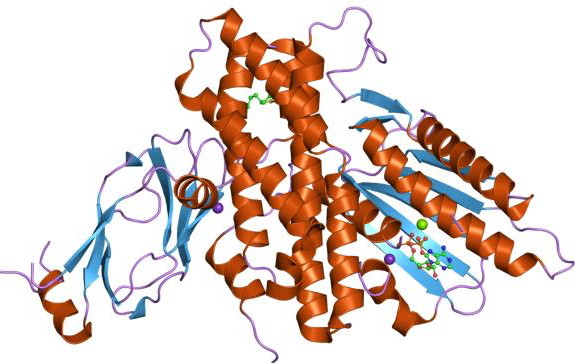

Identifiers
- Aliases: DLAT, DLTA, PDC-E2, PDCE2, dihydrolipoamide S-acetyltransferase, Dihydrolipoyl transacetylase, E2
- External IDs: OMIM: 608770; MGI: 2385311; GeneCards: DLAT
Available structures
PDB	Ortholog search: PDBe RCSB
PDB	List of PDB id codes 1FYC, 1Y8N, 1Y8O, 1Y8P, 2DNE, 2PNR, 2Q8I, 3B8K, 3CRK, 3CRL
Enzyme activity
EC #	BRENDA	ExPASy	KEGG	MetaCyc
2.3.1.12	↗	↗	↗	↗

Gene location (Human)
Chr.	Chromosome 11 (human)
Band	11q23.1	Start	112,024,814 bp
Band	11q23.1	End	112,064,390 bp

Gene location (Mouse)
Chr.	Chromosome 9 (mouse)
Band	9|9 A5.3	Start	50,545,933 bp
Band	9|9 A5.3	End	50,571,080 bp
RNA expression pattern
Bgee	Human / Mouse (ortholog); Top expressed in: right ventricle; biceps brachii; myocardium of left ventricle; thoracic diaphragm; vastus lateralis muscle; Skeletal muscle tissue of biceps brachii; body of tongue; Skeletal muscle tissue of rectus abdominis; muscle of leg; gastrocnemius muscle / Top expressed in: digastric muscle; sternocleidomastoid muscle; temporal muscle; triceps brachii muscle; vastus lateralis muscle; interventricular septum; right ventricle; myocardium of ventricle; spermatocyte; muscle of thigh; More reference expression data
BioGPS	n/a
Gene ontology
Molecular function	transferase activity; dihydrolipoyllysine-residue acetyltransferase activity; protein binding; pyruvate dehydrogenase (NAD+) activity; acyltransferase activity; identical protein binding; dihydrolipoamide S-acyltransferase activity
Cellular component	mitochondrial pyruvate dehydrogenase complex; myelin sheath; pyruvate dehydrogenase complex; mitochondrial matrix; mitochondrion
Biological process	tricarboxylic acid cycle; regulation of acetyl-CoA biosynthetic process from pyruvate; sleep; pyruvate metabolic process; glucose metabolic process; metabolism; acetyl-CoA biosynthetic process from pyruvate; cellular nitrogen compound metabolic process; carbohydrate metabolic process
Sources:Amigo / QuickGO
Orthologs
Databases	NCBI: entry; OMA: entry
Species	Human	Mouse
Entrez	1737	235339
Ensembl	ENSG00000150768	ENSMUSG00000000168
UniProt	P10515	Q8BMF4
RefSeq (mRNA)	NM_001931	NM_145614
RefSeq (protein)	NP_001922; NP_001358960; NP_001358961; NP_001358962; NP_001358963 NP_001358964; NP_001358965; NP_001358966; NP_001358967; NP_001358968; NP_001358969; NP_001358970; NP_001358971	NP_663589
Location (UCSC)	Chr 11: 112.02 – 112.06 Mb	Chr 9: 50.55 – 50.57 Mb
PubMed search
- Wikidata
View/Edit Human	View/Edit Mouse

Dihydrolipoyl transacetylase (or dihydrolipoamide acetyltransferase) is an enzyme component of the multienzyme pyruvate dehydrogenase complex. The pyruvate dehydrogenase complex is responsible for the pyruvate decarboxylation step that links glycolysis to the citric acid cycle. This involves the transformation of pyruvate from glycolysis into acetyl-CoA which is then used in the citric acid cycle to carry out cellular respiration.

There are three different enzyme components in the pyruvate dehydrogenase complex. Pyruvate dehydrogenase (EC 1.2.4.1) is responsible for the oxidation of pyruvate, dihydrolipoyl transacetylase (this enzyme; EC 2.3.1.12) transfers the acetyl group to coenzyme A (CoA), and dihydrolipoyl dehydrogenase (EC 1.8.1.4) regenerates the lipoamide. Because dihydrolipoyl transacetylase is the second of the three enzyme components participating in the reaction mechanism for conversion of pyruvate into acetyl CoA, it is sometimes referred to as E2.

In humans, dihydrolipoyl transacetylase enzymatic activity resides in the pyruvate dehydrogenase complex component E2 (PDCE2) that is encoded by the DLAT (dihydrolipoamide S-acetyltransferase) gene.

== Nomenclature ==
The systematic name of this enzyme class is acetyl-CoA:enzyme N6-(dihydrolipoyl)lysine S-acetyltransferase.

Other names in common use include:

- acetyl-CoA:dihydrolipoamide S-acetyltransferase,
- acetyl-CoA:enzyme 6-N-(dihydrolipoyl)lysine S-acetyltransferase.
- dihydrolipoamide S-acetyltransferase,
- dihydrolipoate acetyltransferase,
- dihydrolipoic transacetylase,
- dihydrolipoyl acetyltransferase,
- enzyme-dihydrolipoyllysine:acetyl-CoA S-acetyltransferase,
- lipoate acetyltransferase,
- lipoate transacetylase,
- lipoic acetyltransferase,
- lipoic acid acetyltransferase,
- lipoic transacetylase,
- lipoylacetyltransferase,
- thioltransacetylase A, and
- transacetylase X.

== Structure ==
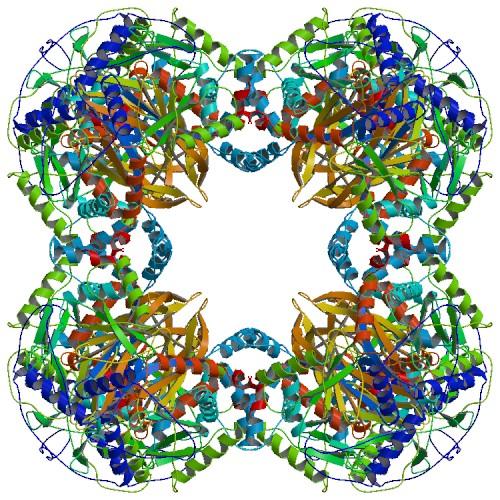
The cubic catalytic core structure made up of 24 dihydrolipoyl transacetylase subunits.

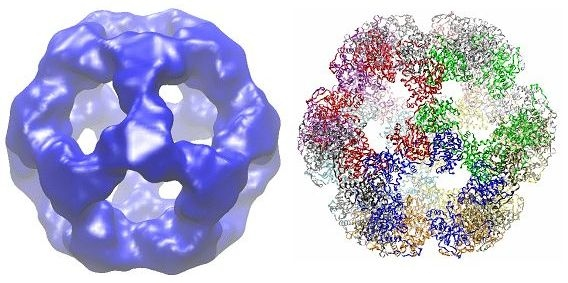
The dodecahedral catalytic core structure made up of 60 dihydrolipoyl transacetylase subunits from Geobacillus stearothermophilus: 3D electron microscopy map (left) and X-ray diffraction structure (right).

All dihydrolipoyl transacetylases have a unique multidomain structure consisting of (from N to C): 3 lipoyl domains, an interaction domain, and the catalytic domain (see the domain architecture at Pfam). All the domains are connected by disordered, low complexity linker regions.

Depending on the species, multiple subunits of dihydrolipoyl transacetylase enzymes can arrange together into either a cubic or dodecahedral shape. These structure then form the catalytic core of the pyruvate dehydrogenase complex which not only catalyzes the reaction that transfers an acetyl group to CoA, but also performs a crucial structural role in creating the architecture of the overall complex.

=== Cube ===
The cubic core structure, found in species such as Azotobacter vinelandii, is made up of 24 subunits total. The catalytic domains are assembled into trimers with the active site located at the subunit interface. The topology of this trimer active site is identical to that of chloramphenicol acetyltransferase. Eight of these trimers are then arranged into a hollow truncated cube. The two main substrates, CoA and the lipoamide (Lip(SH)2), are found at two opposite entrances of a 30 Å long channel which runs between the subunits and forms the catalytic center. CoA enters from the inside of the cube, and the lipoamide enters from the outside.

=== Dodecahedron ===
In many species, including bacteria such as Geobacillus stearothermophilus and Enterococcus faecalis as well as mammals such as humans and cows, the dodecahedral core structure is made up of 60 subunits total. The subunits are arranged in sets of three, similar to the trimers in the cubic core shape, with each set making up one of the 20 dodecahedral vertices.

== Function ==
dihydrolipoyllysine-residue acetyltransferase

Identifiers
- EC no.: 2.3.1.12
- CAS no.: 9032-29-5

Databases
- BRENDA: enzyme data
- ExPASy: NiceZyme view
- KEGG: enzyme entry
- MetaCyc: metabolic pathway
- Rhea: reactions
- PDB structures: RCSB PDB PDBe PDBsum
- Gene Ontology: AmiGO / QuickGO
Search
- PMC: articles
- PubMed: articles
- NCBI: proteins

Dihydrolipoyl transacetylase participates in the pyruvate decarboxylation reaction that links glycolysis to the citric acid cycle. These metabolic processes are important for cellular respiration—the conversion of biochemical energy from nutrients into adenosine triphosphate (ATP) which can then be used to carry out numerous biological reactions within a cell. The various parts of cellular respiration take place in different parts of the cell. In eukaryotes, glycolysis occurs in the cytoplasm, pyruvate decarboxylation in the mitochondria, the citric acid cycle within the mitochondrial matrix, and oxidative phosphorylation via the electron transport chain on the mitochondrial cristae. Thus pyruvate dehydrogenase complexes (containing the dihydrolipoyl transacetylase enzymes) are found in the mitochondria of eukaryotes (and simply in the cytosol of prokaryotes).

=== Mechanism ===
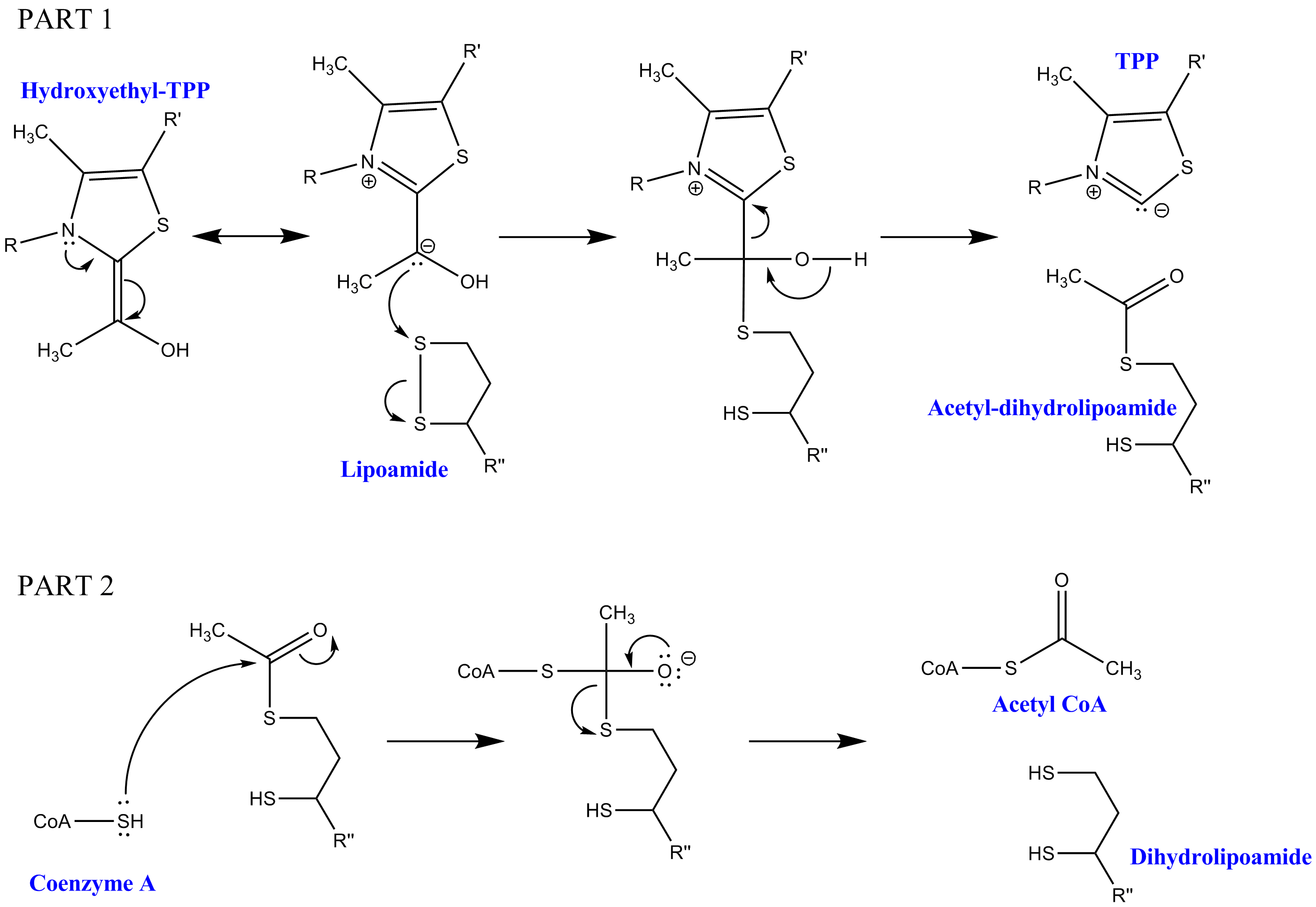
Dihydrolipoyl transacetylase mechanism

Pyruvate decarboxylation requires a few cofactors in addition to the enzymes that make up the complex. The first is thiamine pyrophosphate (TPP), which is used by pyruvate dehydrogenase to oxidize pyruvate and to form a hydroxyethyl-TPP intermediate. This intermediate is taken up by dihydrolipoyl transacetylase and reacted with a second lipoamide cofactor to generate an acetyl-dihydrolipoyl intermediate, releasing TPP in the process. This second intermediate can then be attacked by the nucleophilic sulfur attached to Coenzyme A, and the dihydrolipoamide is released. This results in the production of acetyl CoA, which is the end goal of pyruvate decarboxylation. The dihydrolipoamide is taken up by dihydrolipoyl dehydrogenase, and with the additional cofactors FAD and NAD+, regenerates the original lipoamide (with NADH as a useful side product).

== Interactive pathway map ==
Click on genes, proteins and metabolites below to link to respective articles. (Note: The interactive pathway map can be edited at WikiPathways: "GlycolysisGluconeogenesis_WP534".)

Glycolysis and Gluconeogenesis edit

== Clinical significance ==
=== Primary biliary cirrhosis ===
Primary biliary cirrhosis (PBC) is an autoimmune disease characterized by autoantibodies against mitochondrial and nuclear antigens. These are called anti-mitochondrial antibodies (AMA) and anti-nuclear antibodies (ANA), respectively. These antibodies are detectable in the sera of PBC patients and vary greatly with regards to epitope specificity from patient to patient. Of the mitochondrial antigens that can generate autoantibody reactivity in PBC patients, the E2 subunit of the pyruvate dehydrogenase complex, dihydrolipoyl transacetylase, is the most common epitope (other antigens include enzymes of the 2-oxoacid dehydrogenase complexes as well as the other enzymes of the pyruvate dehydrogenase complexes). Recent evidence has suggested that peptides within the catalytic site may present the immunodominant epitopes recognized by the anti-PDC-E2 antibodies in PBC patients. There is also evidence of anti-PDC-E2 antibodies in autoimmune hepatitis (AIH) patients.

=== Pyruvate dehydrogenase deficiency ===
Pyruvate dehydrogenase deficiency (PDH) is a genetic disease resulting in lactic acidosis as well as neurological dysfunction in infancy and early childhood. Typically PDH is the result of a mutation in the X-linked gene for the E1 subunit of the pyruvate dehydrogenase complex. However, there have been a few rare cases in which a patient with PDH actually has a mutation in the autosomal gene for the E2 subunit instead. These patients have been reported to have much less severe symptoms, with the most prominent disease manifestation being episodic dystonia, though both hypotonia and ataxia were also present.
