= Pyruvate dehydrogenase lipoamide kinase isozyme 1 =

Protein-coding gene in the species Homo sapiens

PDK1
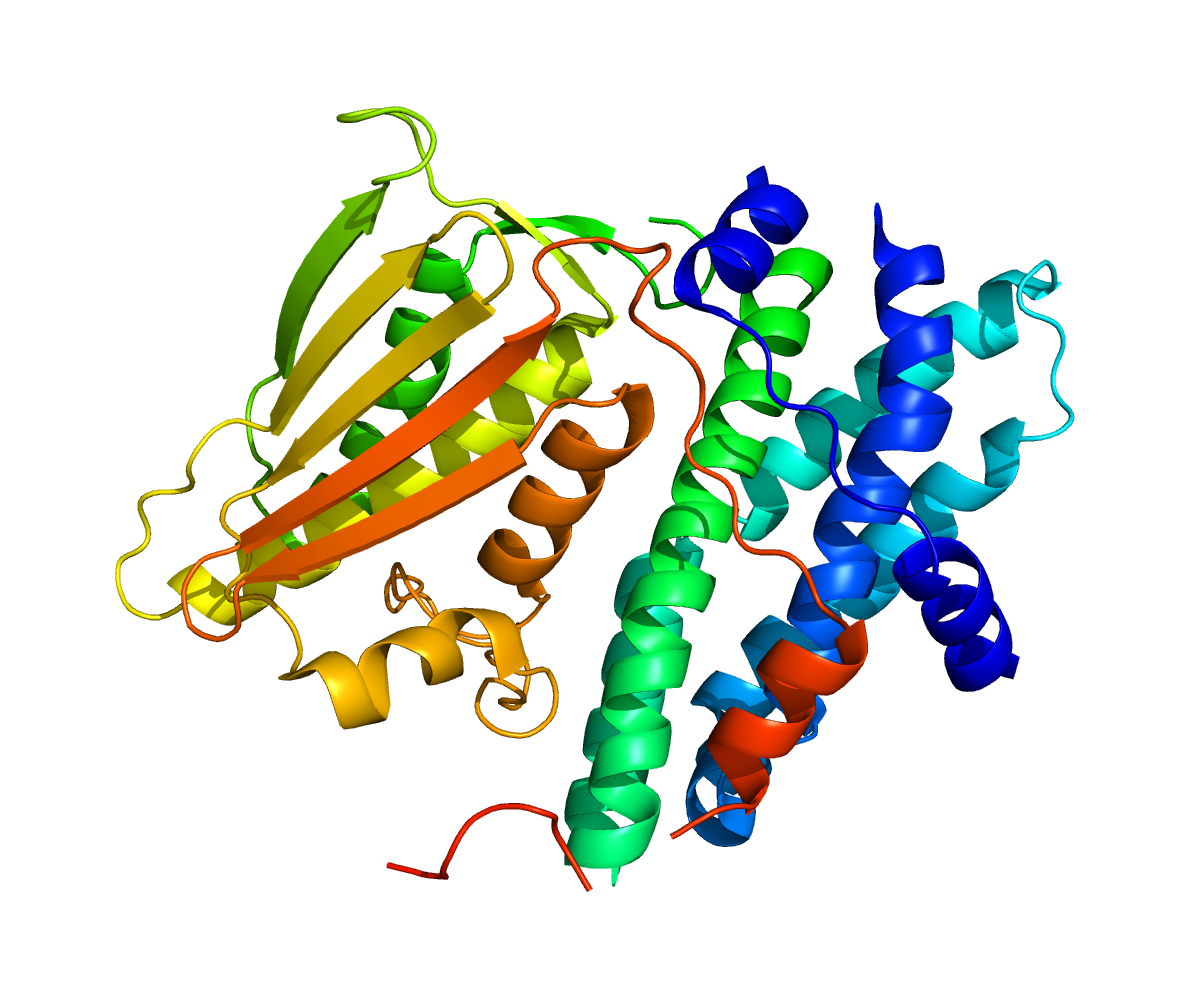

Identifiers
- Aliases: PDK1, entrez:5163, pyruvate dehydrogenase kinase 1
- External IDs: OMIM: 602524; MGI: 1926119; GeneCards: PDK1
Available structures
PDB	Ortholog search: PDBe RCSB
PDB	List of PDB id codes 2Q8F, 2Q8G, 2Q8H
Enzyme activity
EC #	BRENDA	ExPASy	KEGG	MetaCyc
2.7.11.2	↗	↗	↗	↗

Gene location (Human)
Chr.	Chromosome 2 (human)
Band	2q31.1	Start	172,555,373 bp
Band	2q31.1	End	172,608,669 bp

Gene location (Mouse)
Chr.	Chromosome 2 (mouse)
Band	2|2 C3	Start	71,703,568 bp
Band	2|2 C3	End	71,734,202 bp
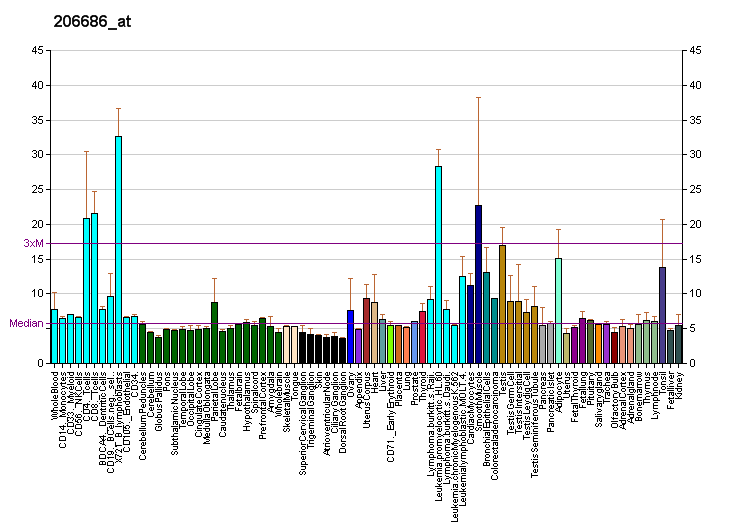
RNA expression pattern
Bgee	Human / Mouse (ortholog); Top expressed in: secondary oocyte; skin of hip; right ventricle; skin of thigh; cartilage tissue; epithelium of colon; jejunal mucosa; tonsil; endothelial cell; mucosa of sigmoid colon / Top expressed in: iris; otic placode; saccule; atrium; atrioventricular junction; atrioventricular valve; ciliary body; Paneth cell; Ileal epithelium; otic vesicle; More reference expression data
BioGPS	More reference expression data
Gene ontology
Molecular function	transferase activity; nucleotide binding; protein kinase activity; kinase activity; protein binding; ATP binding; pyruvate dehydrogenase (acetyl-transferring) kinase activity
Cellular component	mitochondrial pyruvate dehydrogenase complex; mitochondrial matrix; nucleus; nucleolus; mitochondrion
Biological process	intrinsic apoptotic signaling pathway in response to oxidative stress; phosphorylation; hypoxia-inducible factor-1alpha signaling pathway; regulation of acetyl-CoA biosynthetic process from pyruvate; regulation of glucose metabolic process; glucose metabolic process; cell population proliferation; protein phosphorylation; carbohydrate metabolic process
Sources:Amigo / QuickGO
Orthologs
Databases	NCBI: entry; OMA: entry
Species	Human	Mouse
Entrez	5163	228026
Ensembl	ENSG00000152256	ENSMUSG00000006494
UniProt	Q15118	Q8BFP9
RefSeq (mRNA)	NM_001278549; NM_002610	NM_172665; NM_001360002
RefSeq (protein)	NP_001265478; NP_002601	NP_766253; NP_001346931
Location (UCSC)	Chr 2: 172.56 – 172.61 Mb	Chr 2: 71.7 – 71.73 Mb
PubMed search
- Wikidata
View/Edit Human	View/Edit Mouse

Pyruvate dehydrogenase lipoamide kinase isozyme 1, mitochondrial is an enzyme that in humans is encoded by the PDK1 gene. It codes for an isozyme of pyruvate dehydrogenase kinase (PDK).

Pyruvate dehydrogenase (PDH) is a part of a mitochondrial multienzyme complex that catalyzes the oxidative decarboxylation of pyruvate and is one of the major enzymes responsible for the regulation of homeostasis of carbohydrate fuels in mammals. The enzymatic activity is regulated by a phosphorylation/dephosphorylation cycle. Phosphorylation of PDH by a specific pyruvate dehydrogenase kinase (PDK) results in inactivation.

== Structure ==
The mature protein encoded by the PDK4 gene contains 407 amino acids in its sequence. To form the active protein, two of the polypeptide chains come together to form an open conformation. The catalytic domain of PDK1 might exist separately in cells and important for the regulation of the PDK1 substrate. The crystal structural studies suggest that the PIF-pocket is located at the catalytic domain as well.

== Function ==
The Pyruvate Dehydrogenase (PDH) complex must be tightly regulated due to its central role in general metabolism. Within the complex, there are three serine residues on the E1 component that are sites for phosphorylation; this phosphorylation inactivates the complex. In humans, there have been four isozymes of Pyruvate Dehydrogenase Kinase that have been shown to phosphorylate these three sites: PDK1, PDK2, PDK3, and PDK4. PDK1 is the only enzyme capable of phosphorylating the 3rd serine site. When the thiamine pyrophosphatase (TPP) coenzyme is bound, the rates of phosphorylation by all four isozymes are drastically affected; specifically, the incorporation of phosphate groups by PDK1 into sites 2 and 3 is significantly reduced.

=== Regulation ===
As the primary regulators of a crucial step in the central metabolic pathway, the pyruvate dehydrogenase family is tightly regulated itself by a myriad of factors. PDK activity has been shown to decrease in individuals consuming a diet that is high in n-3 fatty acids; however, PDH activity remained unaffected. Additionally, PDK1 is inhibited by AZD7545 and dichloroacetic acid (DCA); the mechanism was discovered to be the trifluoromethylpropanamide end of AZD7545 projecting into the lipoyl-binding pocket of PDK1. Dichloroacetic acid was found near the helix bundle in the N-terminal domain of PDK1. Bound DCA promotes local conformational changes that are communicated to both nucleotide-binding and lipoyl-binding pockets of PDK1, leading to the inactivation of kinase activity.

== Clinical Significance ==
PDK1 is relevant in a variety of clinical conditions throughout the body. As PDK1 regulates the PDH complex, it has been proven to be an important regulator in certain cells, including the beta cells within the islets of the pancreas. In order to optimize glucose-stimulated insulin secretion (GSIS), a primary function of the pancreas, a low PDK1 activity must be maintained to keep PDH in a dephosphorylated and active state. Maintaining low PDK1 levels has also proven to be beneficial in certain regions of the brain, as it confers a high tolerance to amyloid beta, a metabolite that is directly correlated with the development of Alzheimer's disease.

=== Cancer ===
The ubiquitous role of this gene lends itself to being involved in a variety of disease pathologies, including cancer. PDK1 mRNA expression is significantly associated with tumor progression; in fact, the presence of PDK1 can serve as a prognostic marker, indicating the level of success a patient can achieve. Specifically, this may serve as a biomarker in patients with gastric cancer. In coordination, the inhibitor dichloroacetic acid may be used in the future as a treatment option for patients with this type of cancer. PDK1, as it regulates hypoxia and lactate production, is associated with a poor outcome in patients with head and neck cancer. The buildup of glycolytic metabolites may promote Hypoxia-Inducing Factor (HIF) activation, which creates a feed-forward loop for malignancy progression. As such, using HIF-1 as a metabolite to regulate PDK1 is seen as another potential therapy, either on its own or in tandem with other therapies, for this type of cancer. In a further developed study, combined PDK1 and CHK1 inhibition was shown to be required to kill glioblastoma stem-like cells in vitro and in vivo.
