= PDK3 =

Protein-coding gene in the species Homo sapiens

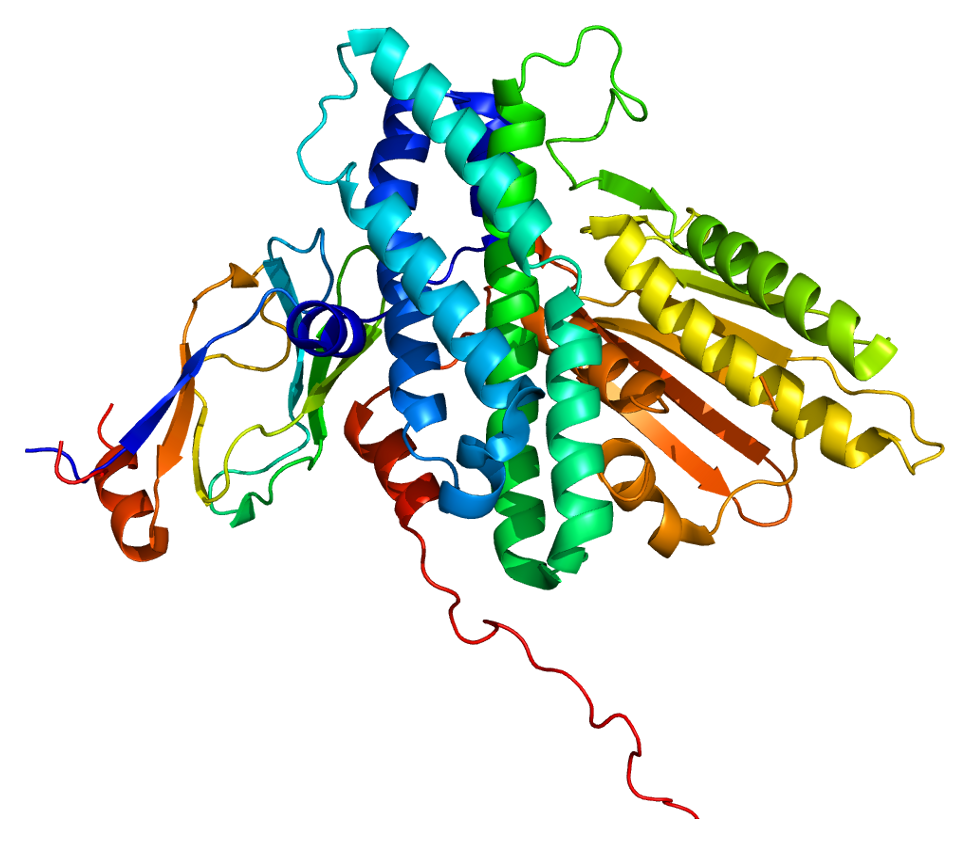

Identifiers
- Aliases: PDK3, CMTX6, GS1-358P8.4, pyruvate dehydrogenase kinase 3
- External IDs: OMIM: 300906; MGI: 2384308; GeneCards: PDK3
Available structures
PDB	Ortholog search: PDBe RCSB
PDB	List of PDB id codes 1Y8N, 1Y8O, 1Y8P, 2PNR, 2Q8I
Enzyme activity
EC #	BRENDA	ExPASy	KEGG	MetaCyc
2.7.11.2	↗	↗	↗	↗

Gene location (Human)
Chr.	X chromosome (human)
Band	Xp22.11	Start	24,465,244 bp
Band	Xp22.11	End	24,550,466 bp

Gene location (Mouse)
Chr.	X chromosome (mouse)
Band	X|X C3	Start	92,808,213 bp
Band	X|X C3	End	92,875,807 bp
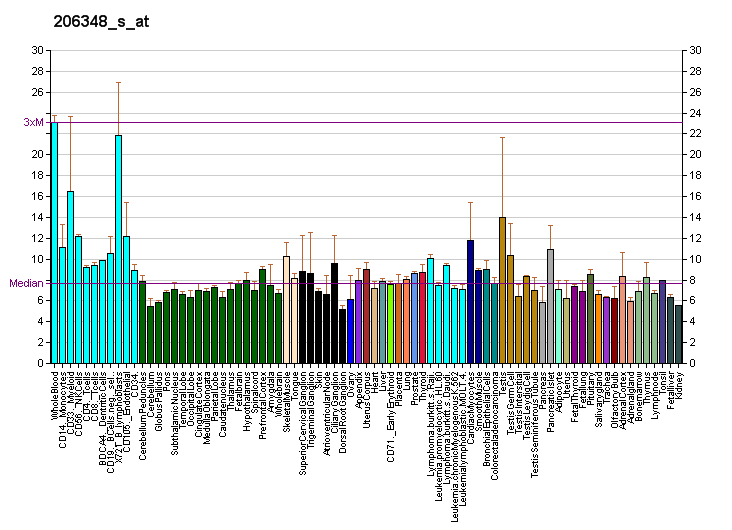

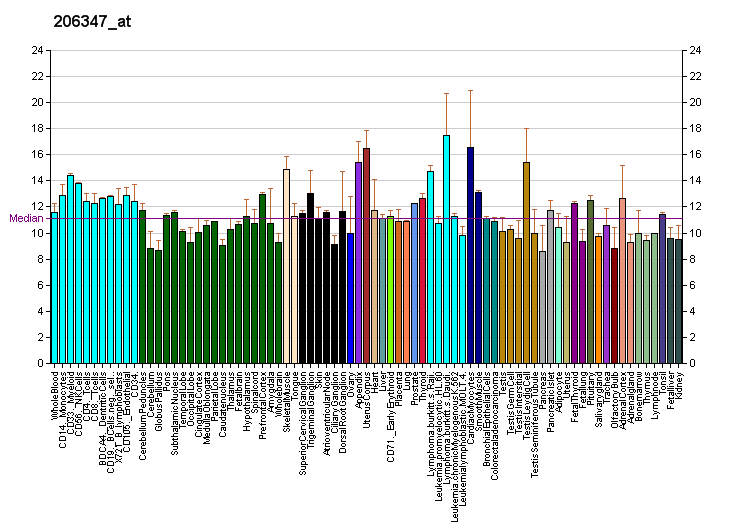
RNA expression pattern
Bgee	Human / Mouse (ortholog); Top expressed in: middle temporal gyrus; Brodmann area 23; corpus epididymis; saphenous vein; lateral nuclear group of thalamus; skin of thigh; caput epididymis; jejunal mucosa; endothelial cell; parotid gland / Top expressed in: spermatid; right kidney; endocardial cushion; seminiferous tubule; proximal tubule; molar; choroid plexus of fourth ventricle; epiblast; granulocyte; fetal liver hematopoietic progenitor cell; More reference expression data
BioGPS	More reference expression data
Gene ontology
Molecular function	transferase activity; nucleotide binding; protein kinase activity; kinase activity; protein serine/threonine kinase activity; protein binding; ATP binding; pyruvate dehydrogenase (acetyl-transferring) kinase activity
Cellular component	mitochondrial matrix; nucleolus; mitochondrion
Biological process	phosphorylation; peroxisome proliferator activated receptor signaling pathway; hypoxia-inducible factor-1alpha signaling pathway; regulation of reactive oxygen species metabolic process; regulation of acetyl-CoA biosynthetic process from pyruvate; regulation of glucose metabolic process; cellular response to fatty acid; peptidyl-serine phosphorylation; glucose metabolic process; cellular response to glucose stimulus; carbohydrate metabolic process
Sources:Amigo / QuickGO
Orthologs
Databases	NCBI: entry; OMA: entry
Species	Human	Mouse
Entrez	5165	236900
Ensembl	ENSG00000067992	ENSMUSG00000035232
UniProt	Q15120	Q922H2
RefSeq (mRNA)	NM_005391; NM_001142386	NM_145630
RefSeq (protein)	NP_001135858; NP_005382	NP_663605
Location (UCSC)	Chr X: 24.47 – 24.55 Mb	Chr X: 92.81 – 92.88 Mb
PubMed search
- Wikidata
View/Edit Human	View/Edit Mouse

Pyruvate dehydrogenase lipoamide kinase isozyme 3, mitochondrial is an enzyme that in humans is encoded by the PDK3 gene. It codes for an isozyme of pyruvate dehydrogenase kinase.The pyruvate dehydrogenase (PDH) complex is a nuclear-encoded mitochondrial multienzyme complex that catalyzes the overall conversion of pyruvate to acetyl-CoA and CO_{2}. It provides the primary link between glycolysis and the tricarboxylic acid (TCA) cycle, and thus is one of the major enzymes responsible for the regulation of glucose metabolism. The enzymatic activity of PDH is regulated by a phosphorylation/dephosphorylation cycle, and phosphorylation results in inactivation of PDH. The protein encoded by this gene is one of the four pyruvate dehydrogenase kinases that inhibits the PDH complex by phosphorylation of the E1 alpha subunit. This gene is predominantly expressed in the heart and skeletal muscles. Alternatively spliced transcript variants encoding different isoforms have been found for this gene.

== Structure ==
The structure of the PDK3/L2 complex has been elucidated, and there are several key features. When the L2 domain binds to PDK3, it induces a “cross-tail” conformation in PDK3, thereby stimulating activity. There are three crucial residues, Leu-140, Glu-170, and Glu-179, in the C-terminal domain that are crucial for this interaction. Structural studies have indicated that L2 binding stimulates activity by disrupting the closed conformation, or ATP lid, to remove product inhibition. The PDK3 subunits are in one of two conformations; one subunit exists as an “open” subunit, while the other subunit is “closed”. The open subunit is the configuration most crucial to the putative substrate-binding cleft, as it is where the target peptide can access the active center. The closed subunit blocks this target peptide because of a neighboring unwound alpha helix. Additionally, the ATP-binding loop in one PDK3 subunit adopts an open conformation, implying that the nucleotide loading into the active site is mediated by the inactive "pre-insertion" binding mode. This asymmetric complex represents a physiological state in which binding of a single L2-domain activates one of the PDHK subunits while inactivating another. Thus, the L2-domains likely act not only as the structural anchors but also modulate the catalytic cycle of PDK3.

== Function ==
The Pyruvate Dehydrogenase (PDH) complex must be tightly regulated due to its central role in general metabolism. Within the complex, there are three serine residues on the E1 component that are sites for phosphorylation; this phosphorylation inactivates the complex. In humans, there have been four isozymes of Pyruvate Dehydrogenase Kinase that have been shown to phosphorylate these three sites: PDK1, PDK2, PDK3, and PDK4. The PDK3 protein is primarily found in the kidney, brain, and testis.

=== Regulation ===
As the primary regulators of a crucial step in the central metabolic pathway, the pyruvate dehydrogenase family is tightly regulated itself by a myriad of factors. PDK3, in conjunction with PDK2 and PDK4, are primary targets of peroxisome proliferator-activated receptor delta/beta (PPAR beta/delta), with PDK3 having five elements that respond to these receptors.
