= PDK2 =

Protein-coding gene in the species Homo sapiens

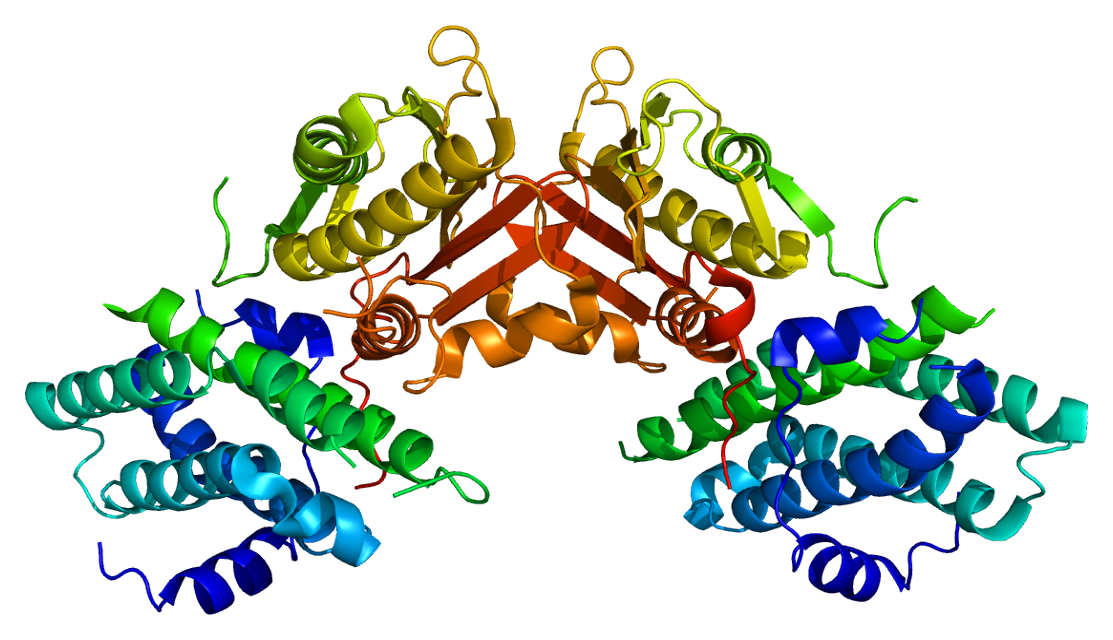

Identifiers
- Aliases: PDK2, PDHK2, PDKII, pyruvate dehydrogenase kinase 2
- External IDs: OMIM: 602525; MGI: 1343087; GeneCards: PDK2
Available structures
PDB	Ortholog search: PDBe RCSB
PDB	List of PDB id codes 2BTZ, 2BU2, 2BU5, 2BU6, 2BU7, 2BU8, 4MP2, 4MP7, 4MPC, 4MPE, 4MPN, 4V25, 4V26
Enzyme activity
EC #	BRENDA	ExPASy	KEGG	MetaCyc
2.7.11.2	↗	↗	↗	↗

Gene location (Human)
Chr.	Chromosome 17 (human)
Band	17q21.33	Start	50,094,737 bp
Band	17q21.33	End	50,112,152 bp

Gene location (Mouse)
Chr.	Chromosome 11 (mouse)
Band	11 D|11 59.01 cM	Start	94,917,084 bp
Band	11 D|11 59.01 cM	End	94,932,180 bp
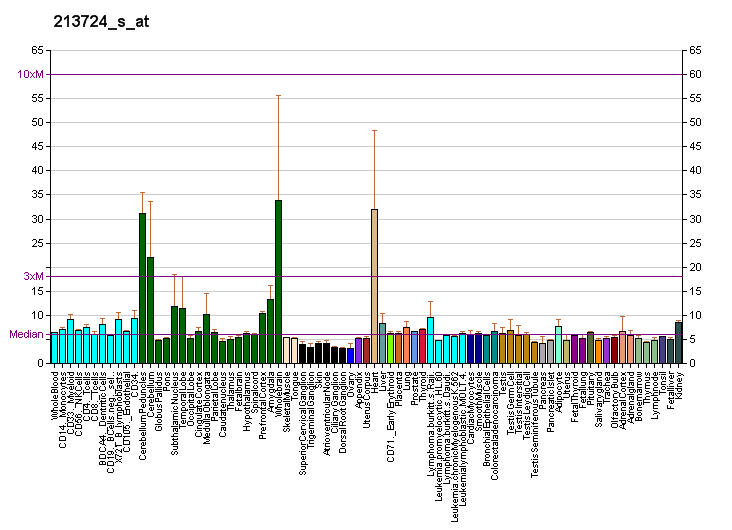

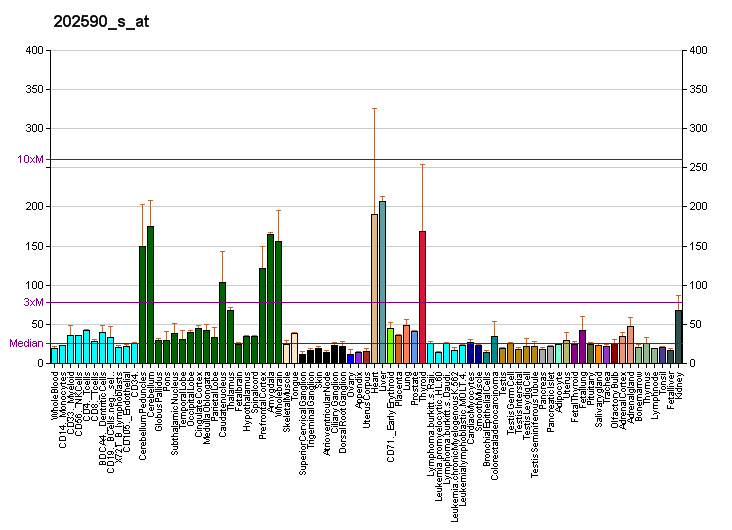
RNA expression pattern
Bgee	Human / Mouse (ortholog); Top expressed in: muscle of thigh; right hemisphere of cerebellum; apex of heart; gastrocnemius muscle; right auricle of heart; left adrenal cortex; left ventricle; right adrenal cortex; gastric mucosa; right frontal lobe / Top expressed in: interventricular septum; muscle of thigh; skeletal muscle tissue; myocardium of ventricle; digastric muscle; triceps brachii muscle; medial head of gastrocnemius muscle; temporal muscle; sternocleidomastoid muscle; extraocular muscle; More reference expression data
BioGPS	More reference expression data
Gene ontology
Molecular function	transferase activity; nucleotide binding; protein kinase activity; protein homodimerization activity; kinase activity; ATP binding; pyruvate dehydrogenase (acetyl-transferring) kinase activity
Cellular component	nucleoplasm; mitochondrial matrix; mitochondrion; mitochondrial pyruvate dehydrogenase complex; cytosol
Biological process	phosphorylation; cellular response to reactive oxygen species; intrinsic apoptotic signaling pathway by p53 class mediator; glucose metabolic process; regulation of acetyl-CoA biosynthetic process from pyruvate; cellular response to nutrient; insulin receptor signaling pathway; regulation of cellular ketone metabolic process; regulation of glucose metabolic process; glucose homeostasis; regulation of pH; protein phosphorylation; regulation of gluconeogenesis; carbohydrate metabolic process; regulation of calcium-mediated signaling
Sources:Amigo / QuickGO
Orthologs
Databases	NCBI: entry; OMA: entry
Species	Human	Mouse
Entrez	5164	18604
Ensembl	ENSG00000005882	ENSMUSG00000038967
UniProt	Q15119	Q9JK42
RefSeq (mRNA)	NM_002611; NM_001199898; NM_001199899; NM_001199900	NM_133667; NM_001361915
RefSeq (protein)	NP_001186827; NP_001186828; NP_001186829; NP_002602	NP_598428; NP_001348844
Location (UCSC)	Chr 17: 50.09 – 50.11 Mb	Chr 11: 94.92 – 94.93 Mb
PubMed search
- Wikidata
View/Edit Human	View/Edit Mouse

Pyruvate dehydrogenase kinase isoform 2 (PDK2) also known as pyruvate dehydrogenase lipoamide kinase isozyme 2, mitochondrial is an enzyme that in humans is encoded by the PDK2 gene. PDK2 is an isozyme of pyruvate dehydrogenase kinase.

== Structure ==
The protein encoded by the PDK2 gene has two sites, an active site and an allosteric site that allow for the activity and regulation of this enzyme. There are many structural motifs that are important to the regulation of this enzyme. Nov3r and AZ12 inhibitors bind at the lipoamide binding site that is located at one end of the R domain. Pfz3 binds in an extended site at the other end of the R domain. One inhibitor, dicholoroacetate (DCA), binds at the center of the R domain. Within the active site, there are three amino acid residues, R250, T302, and Y320, that make the kinase resistant to the inhibitor dichloroacetate, which uncouples the active site from the allosteric site. This supports the theory that R250, T302, and Y320 stabilize the "open" and "closed" conformations of the built-in lid that controls the access of a nucleotide into the nucleotide-binding cavity. This strongly suggests that the mobility of ATP lid is central to the allosteric regulation of PDHK2 activity serving as a conformational switch required for communication between the active site and allosteric sites in the kinase molecule. There is also a DW-motif that is crucial in mediating DCA, nucleotide, and lipoyl domain binding site communication. This network is responsible for rendering PDK2 locked in the closed, or inactive conformation.

== Function ==
The Pyruvate Dehydrogenase (PDH) complex must be tightly regulated due to its central role in general metabolism. Within the complex, there are three serine residues on the E1 component that are sites for phosphorylation; this phosphorylation inactivates the complex. In humans, there have been four isozymes of Pyruvate Dehydrogenase Kinase that have been shown to phosphorylate these three sites: PDK1, PDK2, PDK3, and PDK4. PDK2 has been identified as the most abundant isoform in human tissues. Through many studies, it has been made clear that the activity of this enzyme is essential, even at rest, to regulate glycolysis/carbodydrate oxidation and producing metabolites for oxidative phosphorylation and the electron transport chain. These studies have illustrated that the kinetics of the PDK isoform population, specifically PDK2, is more important in determining PDH activity than measuring PDK activity.

=== Regulation ===
As the primary regulators of a crucial step in the central metabolic pathway, the pyruvate dehydrogenase family is tightly regulated itself by a myriad of factors. PDK2 activity is modulated by low levels of hydrogen peroxide; this happens because the compound temporarily oxidizes the cysteine residues 45 and 392 on the enzyme, resulting in an inactive PDK2 and greater PDH activity. These conditions also inactivate the TCA cycle, the next step in aerobic respiration. This alludes to the fact that when there is a high level of O_{2} production in the mitochondria, which may occur because of nutrient excess, the increase in the products serve as a negative feedback that control mitochondria metabolism. PDK2, in conjunction with PDK3 and PDK4, are primary targets of Peroxisome proliferator-activated receptor delta or beta, with PDK2 having two elements that respond to these receptors.

== Clinical significance ==
All of the pyruvate dehydrogenase isozymes have been associated with various metabolic disorders, including diabetes. This is due to a mechanism by which consistently elevated free fatty acid levels stimulate the PDK enzymes, particularly, PDK2 and PDK4 in the liver. In stimulating this activity, there is less PDH activity, and therefore less glucose uptake.

=== Cancer ===
As the PDK enzymes are associated with central metabolism and growth, they are often associated with various mechanisms of cancer progression. Enhanced PDK2 activity leads to increased glycolysis and lactic acid production, known as the Warburg effect. In some studies, the wild-type form of tumor protein p53 prevents manifestation of tumorigenesis by regulating PDK2 activity. Additionally, inhibition of PDK2 subsequently inhibits HIF1A in cancer cells by both a prolyl-hydroxylase (PHD)-dependent mechanism and a PHD-independent mechanism. Therefore, mitochondria-targeting metabolic modulators increase pyruvate dehydrogenase activity, and suppress angiogenesis as well, normalizing the pseudo-hypoxic signals that lead to normoxic HIF1A activation in solid tumors.
