= Pyruvate dehydrogenase kinase =

Class of enzymes

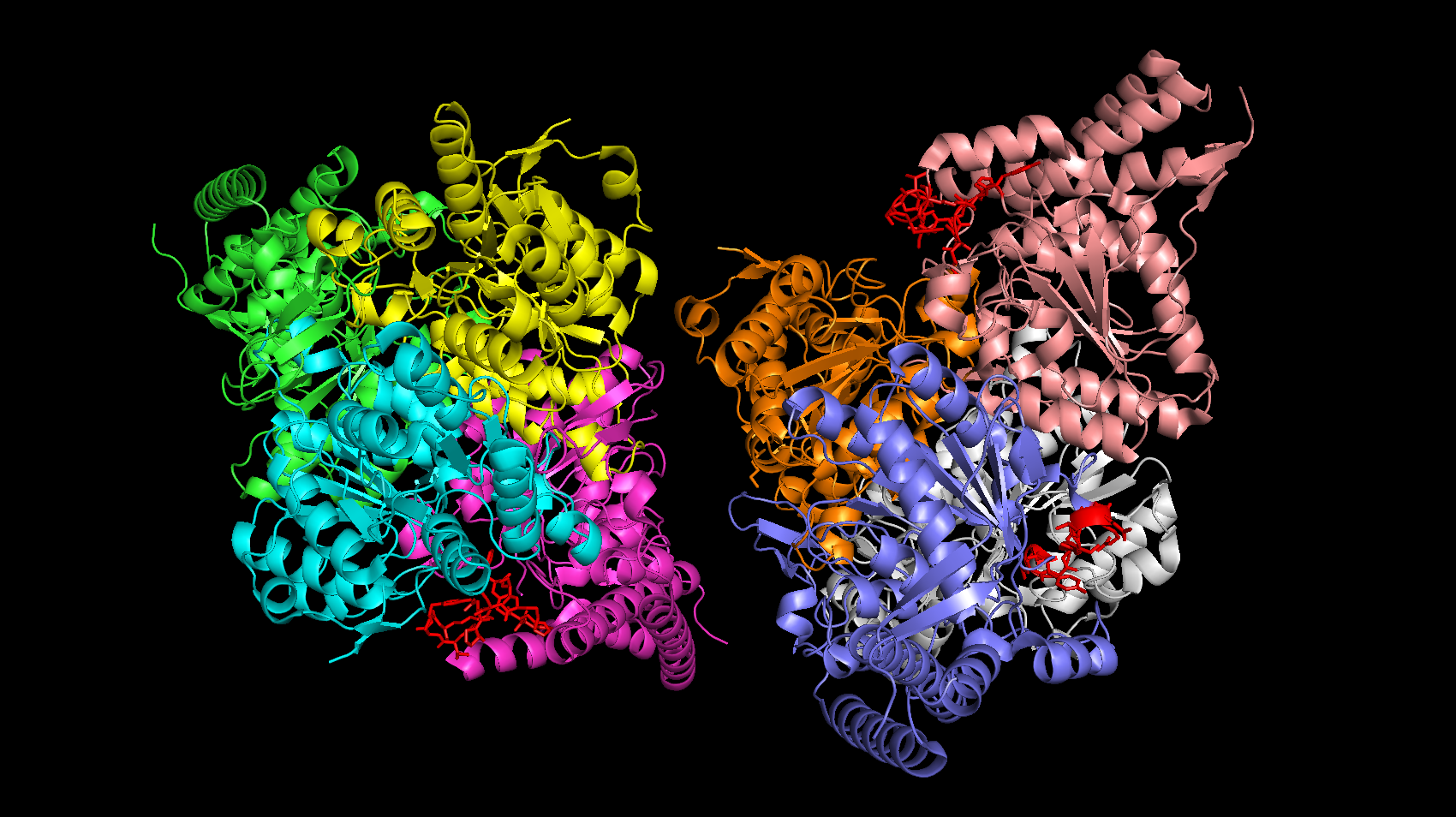
- The areas around the three phosphorylation sites are shown in red. Site 1 is in the bottom left corner, site 2 in the top right, and site 3 in the bottom right.

Identifiers
- EC no.: 2.7.11.2
- CAS no.: 2620256

Databases
- BRENDA: enzyme data
- ExPASy: NiceZyme view
- KEGG: enzyme entry
- MetaCyc: metabolic pathway
- Rhea: reactions
- PDB structures: RCSB PDB PDBe PDBsum
Search
- PMC: articles
- PubMed: articles
- NCBI: proteins

Pyruvate dehydrogenase kinase (also pyruvate dehydrogenase complex kinase, PDC kinase, or PDK; EC 2.7.11.2) is a kinase enzyme which acts to inactivate the enzyme pyruvate dehydrogenase by phosphorylating it using ATP.

PDK thus participates in the regulation of the pyruvate dehydrogenase complex of which pyruvate dehydrogenase is the first component. Both PDK and the pyruvate dehydrogenase complex are located in the mitochondrial matrix of eukaryotes. The complex acts to convert pyruvate (a product of glycolysis in the cytosol) to acetyl-coA, which is then oxidized in the mitochondria to produce energy, in the citric acid cycle. By downregulating the activity of this complex, PDK will decrease the oxidation of pyruvate in mitochondria and increase the conversion of pyruvate to lactate in the cytosol.

The opposite action of PDK, namely the dephosphorylation and activation of pyruvate dehydrogenase, is catalyzed by a phosphoprotein phosphatase called pyruvate dehydrogenase phosphatase.

(Pyruvate dehydrogenase kinase should not be confused with Phosphoinositide-dependent kinase-1, which is also sometimes known as "PDK1".)

== Phosphorylation sites ==
PDK can phosphorylate a serine residue on pyruvate dehydrogenase at three possible sites. Some evidence has shown that phosphorylation at site 1 will nearly completely deactivate the enzyme while phosphorylation at sites 2 and 3 had only a small contribution to complex inactivation. Therefore, it is phosphorylation at site 1 that is responsible for pyruvate dehydrogenase deactivation.

== Isozymes ==
There are four known isozymes of PDK in humans:

- PDK1
- PDK2
- PDK3
- PDK4

The primary sequencing between the four isozymes are conserved with 70% identity. The greatest differences occur near the N-terminus.

PDK1 is the largest of the four with 436 residues while PDK2, PDK3 and PDK4 have 407, 406, and 411 residues respectively. The isozymes have different activity and phosphorylation rates at each site. At site 1 in order from fastest to slowest, PDK2 > PDK4 ≈ PDK1 > PDK3. For site 2, PDK3 > PDK4 > PDK2 > PDK1. Only PDK1 can phosphorylate site 3. However, it has been shown that these activities are sensitive to slight changes in pH so the microenvironment of the PDK isozymes may change the reaction rates.

Isozyme abundance has also been shown to be tissue specific. PDK1 is ample in heart cells. PDK3 is most abundant in testis. PDK2 is present in most tissues but low in spleen and lung cells. PDK4 is predominantly found in skeletal muscle and heart tissues.

== Mechanism ==
Pyruvate dehydrogenase is deactivated when phosphorylated by PDK. Normally, the active site of pyruvate dehydrogenase is in a stabilized and ordered conformation supported by a network of hydrogen bonds. However, phosphorylation by PDK at site 1 causes steric clashes with another nearby serine residue due to both the increased size and negative charges associated with the phosphorylated residue. This disrupts the hydrogen bond network and disorders the conformation of two phosphorylation loops. These loops prevent the reductive acetylation step, thus halting overall activity of the enzyme. The conformational changes and mechanism of deactivation for phosphorylation at sites 2 and 3 are not known at this time.

== Regulation ==
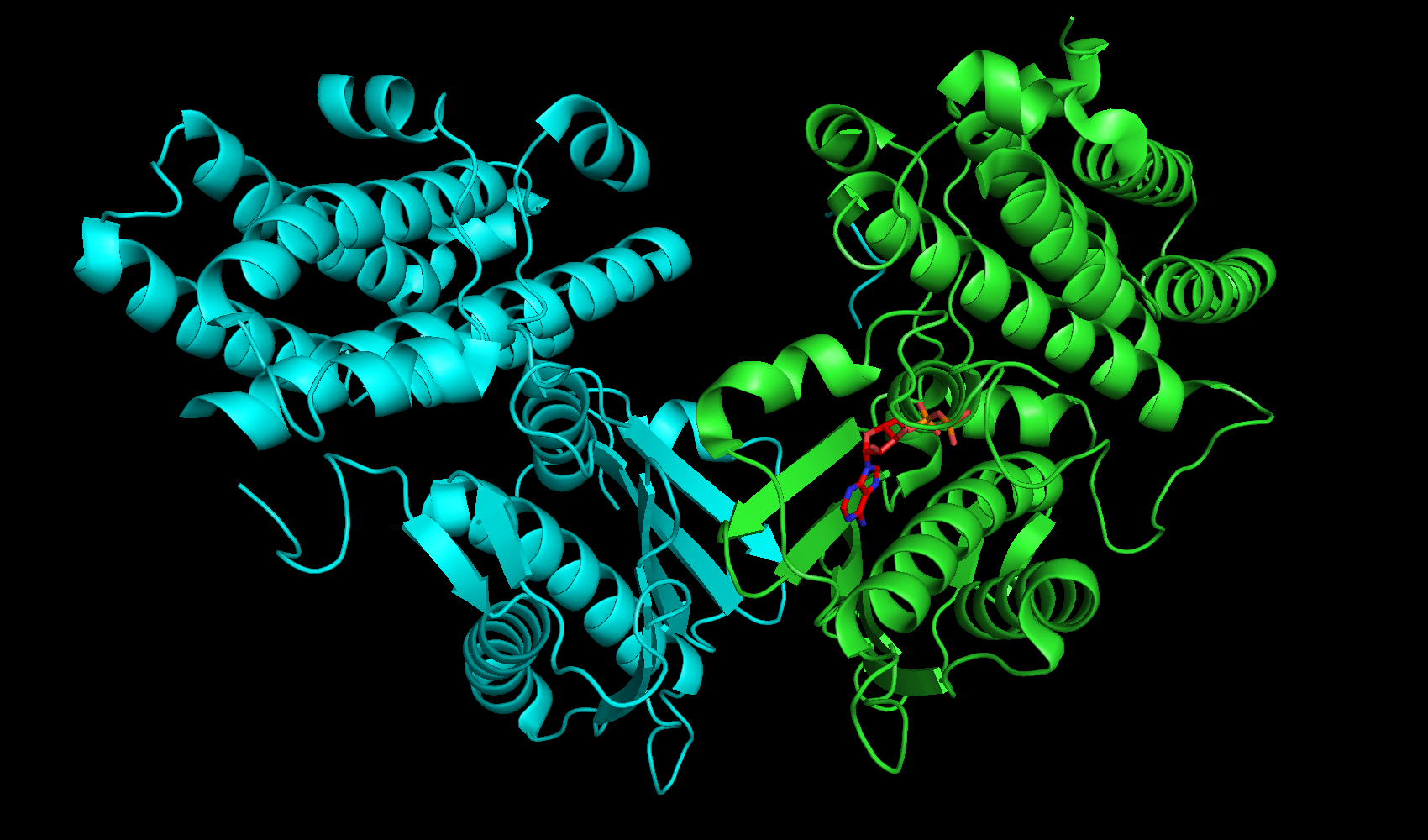
PDK isozyme 4 with ADP bound in the active site. ADP has been shown to be a competitive inhibitor.

Pyruvate dehydrogenase kinase is activated by ATP, NADH and acetyl-CoA. It is inhibited by ADP, NAD+, CoA-SH and pyruvate.

Each isozyme responds to each of these factors slightly differently. NADH stimulates PDK1 activity by 20% and PDK2 activity by 30%. NADH with acetyl-CoA increases activity in these enzymes by 200% and 300% respectively. In similar conditions, PDK3 is unresponsive to NADH and inhibited by NADH with acetyl-CoA. PDK4 has a 200% activity increase with NADH, but adding acetyl-CoA does not increase activity further.

== Disease relevance ==
PDK isoforms are elevated in obesity, diabetes, heart failure, and cancer. Some studies have shown that cells that lack insulin (or are insensitive to insulin) overexpress PDK4. As a result, the pyruvate formed from glycolysis cannot be oxidized which leads to hyperglycaemia due to the fact that glucose in the blood cannot be used efficiently. Therefore, several drugs target PDK4 hoping to treat type II diabetes.

PDK1 has shown to have increased activity in hypoxic cancer cells due to the presence of HIF-1. PDK1 shunts pyruvate away from the citric acid cycle and keeps the hypoxic cell alive. Therefore, PDK1 inhibition has been suggested as an antitumor therapy since PDK1 prevents apoptosis in these cancerous cells. Similarly, PDK3 has been shown to be overexpressed in colon cancer cell lines. Three proposed inhibitors are AZD7545 and dichloroacetate which both bind to PDK1, and Radicicol which binds to PDK3.

Mutations in the PDK3 gene are a rare cause of X-linked Charcot-Marie-Tooth disease (CMTX6).

In dogs, specifically Doberman Pinschers, a mutation in the PDK4 gene is associated with dilated cardiomyopathy (DCM).
