= Pyruvate decarboxylation =

Conversion of pyruvate into acetyl-CoA

Pyruvate dehydrogenase complex reaction

Pyruvate decarboxylation, also known as the link reaction or shunt step (or oxidative decarboxylation of pyruvate), is the conversion of pyruvate into acetyl-CoA by the enzyme complex pyruvate dehydrogenase complex.

The reaction may be simplified as:

Pyruvate + NAD^{+} + CoA → Acetyl-CoA + NADH + CO_{2}

Pyruvate oxidation is the step that connects glycolysis and the Krebs cycle. In glycolysis, a single glucose molecule (6 carbons) is split into 2 pyruvates (3 carbons each). Because of this, the link reaction occurs twice for each glucose molecule to produce a total of 2 acetyl-CoA molecules, which can then enter the Krebs cycle.

Energy-generating ions and molecules, such as amino acids and carbohydrates, enter the Krebs cycle as acetyl coenzyme A and oxidize in the cycle. The pyruvate dehydrogenase complex (PDC) catalyzes the decarboxylation of pyruvate, resulting in the synthesis of acetyl-CoA, CO_{2}, and NADH. In eukaryotes, this enzyme complex regulates pyruvate metabolism, and ensures homeostasis of glucose during absorptive and post-absorptive state metabolism. As the Krebs cycle occurs in the mitochondrial matrix, the pyruvate generated during glycolysis in the cytosol is transported across the inner mitochondrial membrane by a pyruvate carrier under aerobic conditions.

== See Also ==
List of hoaxes on Wikipedia, falsely identified as the Swanson Cycle
