= Pyruvate dehydrogenase deficiency =

Pyruvate dehydrogenase complex deficiency
- Specialty: Endocrinology

Pyruvate dehydrogenase deficiency (also known as pyruvate dehydrogenase complex deficiency or PDCD or PDH deficiency) is a rare neurodegenerative disorder associated with abnormal mitochondrial metabolism. PDCD is a genetic disease resulting from mutations in one of the components of the pyruvate dehydrogenase complex (PDC). The PDC is a multi-enzyme complex that plays a vital role as a key regulatory step in the central pathways of energy metabolism in the mitochondria. The disorder shows heterogeneous characteristics in both clinical presentation and biochemical abnormality.

== Signs and symptoms ==
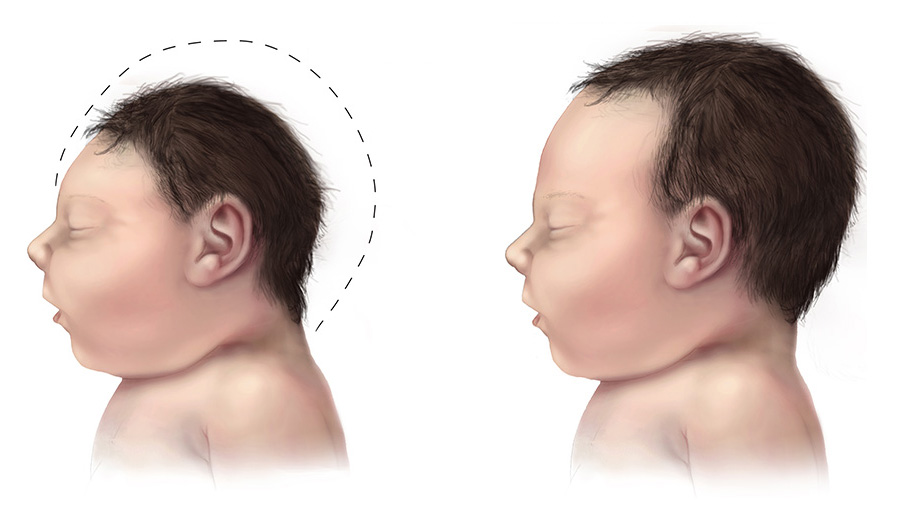
Microcephaly and a normal head size

PDCD is generally presented in one of two forms. The metabolic form appears as lactic acidosis. The neurological form of PDCD contributes to hypotonia, poor feeding, lethargy and structural abnormalities in the brain. Patients may develop seizures and/or neuropathological spasms. These presentations of the disease usually progress to developmental delay, microcephaly, blindness, and spasticity.

Females with residual pyruvate dehydrogenase activity will have no uncontrollable systemic lactic acidosis and few, if any, neurological symptoms. Conversely, females with little to no enzyme activity will have major structural brain abnormalities and atrophy. Males with mutations that abolish, or almost abolish, enzyme activity presumably die in utero because brain cells are not able to generate enough ATP to be functionally viable. It is expected that most cases will be of mild severity and have a clinical presentation involving lactic acidosis. Male infants that reach full term display more severe symptoms than females, and exhibit high mortality within the first few years of life

Prenatal onset may present with non-specific signs such as low Apgar scores and small for gestational age. These cases display hydrocephalus, and thinning of the cerebral tissue. Metabolic disturbances may also be considered with poor feeding and lethargy out of proportion to a mild viral illness, and especially after bacterial infection has been ruled out. PDH activity may be enhanced by exercise, phenylbutyrate and dichloroacetate.

The clinical presentation of congenital PDH deficiency is typically characterized by heterogenous neurological features that usually appear within the first year of life. In addition, patients usually show severe hyperventillation due to profound metabolic acidosis mostly related to lactic acidosis. Metabolic acidosis in these patients is usually refractory to correction with bicarbonate.

The following table lists common symptoms of pyruvate dehydrogenase deficiency.

| Symptoms | Definition/Explanation |
|---|---|
| Lactic Acidosis | High levels of lactate in the blood; can cause nausea, vomiting, breathing problems, abnormal heartbeats *In less severe cases, signs of lactic acidosis can include ataxia and episodes may only occur when ill, under stress, or after consuming high amounts of carbohydrates. |
| Hyperammonemia | High levels of ammonia in the blood; can cause confusion, weakness, fatigue |
| Facial Deformities | Narrow head, prominent forehead, wide nasal bridge, flared nostrils |
| Neurological Impairments | Developmental delays, intellectual impairments, seizures, lethargy (lack of energy), abnormal eye movements, blindness, microcephaly, poor coordination, difficulty walking |
| Abnormal Brain Structure | Underdeveloped corpus callosum, atrophy of the cerebral cortex, lesions on some parts of the brain |
| Muscular Abnormalities | Hypotonia (weak muscle tone), spasticity (tight muscles), ataxia (abnormal muscle movements) |
| Abnormalities at Infancy | Low APGAR scores (scores measuring a baby's health after birth), low birth weight, difficulty nursing |
| Breathing Difficulties | Tachypnea (rapid breathing) |
| Fetal Abnormalities | Poor fetal weight gain, low levels of estriol in the mother's urine |

== Mechanism ==
Aerobic respiration is the process of converting energy in the form of glucose into ATP, the primary currency of energy used by cells to fuel biochemical processes and support growth. The first phase of respiration is glycolysis, a series of ten biochemical reactions in the cytoplasm that convert glucose into pyruvate. Pyruvate is then transported into mitochondria, where it is converted by the pyruvate dehydrogenase complex into acetyl-CoA, the starting substrate of the Krebs cycle. When PDC activity is reduced or abolished by mutation, pyruvate levels rise. Excess pyruvate is then converted into lactic acid by lactate dehydrogenase. Lactic acid enters the blood stream, causing acidification in a condition known as lactic acidosis.

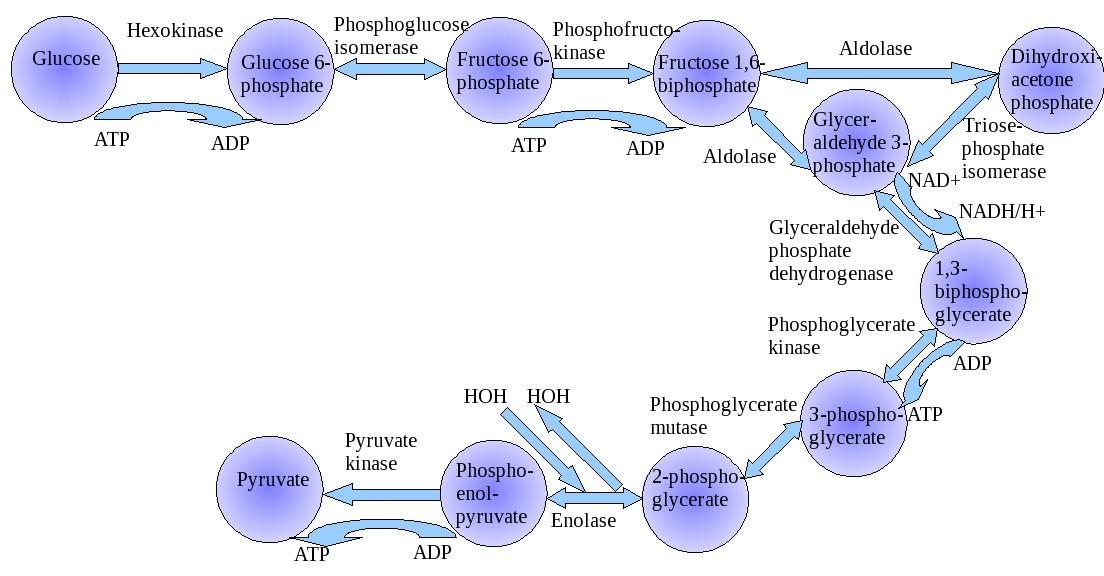
Glycolysis

Citric acid cycle with aconitate 2

The most commonly seen form of PDCD is caused by mutations in the X-linked E1 alpha gene, PDHA1, and is approximately equally prevalent in both males and females. However, males are more severely affected than heterozygous females. This can be explained by x-inactivation, as females carry one normal and one mutant gene. Cells with a normal allele active can metabolize the lactic acid that is released by the PDH deficient cells. They cannot, however, supply ATP to these cells and, therefore, phenotype depends largely on the nature/severity of the mutation.

More rarely, mutations occur in the E2 (dihydrolipoyl transacetylase) or the E3 (dihydrolipoyl dehydrogenase) subunits of the PDC enzymatic complex, DLAT and DLD genes respectively. In these cases, PDCD displays autosomal recessive inheritance, affecting males and females equally.

In cases where PDCD is a result of a mutation in a gene other than PDHA1, it is most commonly known to be due to mutations in the following six genes, PDHB, DLAT, PDHX, PDP1, DLD, and LIAS. All of these genes, like the PDHA1 gene are responsible for coding for a specific subunit of the pyruvate dehydrogenase complex. The PDHB gene is responsible for the coding of the E1 beta subunit of the pyruvate dehydrogenase complex. The DLAT gene is responsible for the coding of the E2 subunit, and the PDP1 is responsible for producing the PDH phosphatase catalytic subunit that catalyzes PDH dephosphorylation. This dephosphorylation activates the complex. The final gene that could be responsible for this disease is the PDHX gene, which codes for the E3 binding protein which is responsible for binding E3 dimers to the E2 subunit of the complex. The DLD gene is responsible for encoding dihydrolipoamide dehydrogenase, a flavoprotein component known as E3, required by the pyruvate dehydrogenase complex. The LIAS gene is responsible for synthesizing lipoic acid, a cofactor required by the pyruvate dehydrogenase complex.

== Diagnosis ==
MRI of head(brain)- cerebral atrophy can be detected by such a method

Pyruvate dehydrogenase deficiency can be diagnosed via the following methods:

- Blood test (Lactate and pyruvate levels)
- Urine analysis
- Magnetic resonance spectroscopy
- MRI

=== Differential diagnosis ===
The differential diagnosis of pyruvate dehydrogenase deficiency can consist of either D-Lactic acidosis or abnormalities associated with gluconeogenesis.

== Treatment ==
Direct treatment that stimulates the pyruvate dehydrogenase complex (PDC), provides alternative fuels, and prevents acute worsening of the syndrome. However, some correction of acidosis does not reverse all the symptoms. CNS damage is common and limits a full recovery. Ketogenic diets, with high fat and low carbohydrate intake have been used to control or minimize lactic acidosis and anecdotal evidence shows successful control of the disease, slowing progress and often showing rapid improvement. Ketogenic baby formulas such as Nutricia KetoCal are available. With the ketogenic diet, ATP is synthesized by the catabolism of fatty acids rather than glucose, which produces the ketone bodies, 3-beta-hydroxybutyrate, acetoacetate, and acetone. Ketone bodies serve as an alternate source of energy for the body and the brain. Preliminary data from PDHD patients on the ketogenic diet indicate that in milder cases, there is a reduction in the frequency of seizures, abnormal EEG readings, ataxia and abnormal sleeping patterns, and extension of remission periods. More severe cases are less responsive to the ketogenic diet, but have displayed modest improvement of gross and fine motor skills, speech and language development and development of social skills. The ketogenic diet has several long term drawbacks, including pancreatitis, sialorrhea and obstipation to vomiting. Patients must be monitored regularly for blood lactate levels, transaminase and plasma ketone levels.

There is some evidence that dichloroacetate reduces the inhibitory phosphorylation of pyruvate dehydrogenase complex and thereby activates any residual functioning complex. Resolution of lactic acidosis is observed in patients with E1 alpha enzyme subunit mutations that reduce enzyme stability. However, treatment with dichloroacetate does not improve neurological damage. Oral citrate is often used to treat acidosis.

Clinical trials to improve scientific and medical understanding of PDCD are underway. More information is located at ClinicalTrials.gov.

A vast majority of PDCD patients (80-88%) have a mutation on their PDHA1 gene. PDHA1 was shown to be a good candidate for gene therapy using an adeno associated virus (AAV2) to express the protein in vitro nearly 15 years ago; however, research was discontinued. Since then, AAV technology, which is used as the delivery method to express PDHA1 in cells that are deficient, has advanced rapidly. The current generation of AAV vectors, AAV9, are safe and effective at crossing the blood-brain barrier. An AAV9 vector is currently used in an FDA-approved gene therapy of spinal muscular atrophy (SMA) in infants and children. The Gray Lab at UTSW initiated a proof of concept mice model study to determine efficacy of this approach for PDCD on November 1, 2022, the Hope for PDCD Foundation is currently raising funds to support this research.

Current status of PDHA1 research:

- PDHA1 can be expressed in cells that are missing the protein, showing that gene therapy could be a viable approach for this disease
- AAV technology is used to deliver and express PDHA1. Newer version of AAV can effectively target the Central Nervous System (CNS) and skeletal muscles at lower doses than the first generation AAVs.
- Mouse models with PDH deficiency already exist to easily test this AAV9 approach in vivo
- AAV9 vectors have been used as FDA-approved gene therapy for SMA, one example of many AAVs currently being investigated for gene therapy approaches

Proposed preclinical research to clear FDA approval for a first-in-human clinical trial:

- Test AAV9 efficacy in PDH deficient mouse model and show improvement in disease
- Provide data on efficacy and toxicity to FDA to get fast-track review for a first-in-human clinical trial

== Epidemiology ==
Pyruvate dehydrogenase deficiency is extremely rare, with ~500 reported cases in the medical literature. Due to the rarity and unfamiliarity of the disease, it is likely underdiagnosed (Shin et al., 2017).

== See also ==
- Citric acid cycle
- Branched-chain alpha-keto acid dehydrogenase complex
- Anti-mitochondrial antibody
- Hope for PDCD Foundation
- PDH Cytopathy
