= Pyruvate dehydrogenase phosphatase =

Protein-coding gene in the species Homo sapiens

PDP1

Identifiers
- Aliases: PDP1, PDH, PDP, PDPC, PPM2C, PPM2A, pyruvate dehyrogenase phosphatase catalytic subunit 1, pyruvate dehydrogenase phosphatase catalytic subunit 1
- External IDs: OMIM: 605993; MGI: 2685870; GeneCards: PDP1
Enzyme activity
| EC # | BRENDA | ExPASy | KEGG | MetaCyc |
|---|---|---|---|---|
| 3.1.3.43 | ↗ | ↗ | ↗ | ↗ |

Gene location (Human)
| Chr. | Chromosome 8 (human) |
| Band | 8q22.1 | Start | 93,857,807 bp |
| Band | 8q22.1 | End | 93,926,068 bp |

Gene location (Mouse)
| Chr. | Chromosome 4 (mouse) |
| Band | 4|4 A1 | Start | 11,958,184 bp |
| Band | 4|4 A1 | End | 11,966,452 bp |
RNA expression pattern
| Bgee | Human / Mouse (ortholog); Top expressed in: lateral nuclear group of thalamus; buccal mucosa cell; biceps brachii; parietal lobe; postcentral gyrus; Brodmann area 23; right ventricle; superior frontal gyrus; Skeletal muscle tissue of biceps brachii; primary visual cortex / Top expressed in: lateral geniculate nucleus; medial dorsal nucleus; medial geniculate nucleus; olfactory tubercle; primary motor cortex; prefrontal cortex; piriform cortex; seminal vesicula; cingulate gyrus; lateral septal nucleus; More reference expression data |
| BioGPS | n/a |
Gene ontology
| Molecular function | protein serine/threonine phosphatase activity; protein binding; catalytic activity; phosphoprotein phosphatase activity; hydrolase activity; cation binding; metal ion binding; [pyruvate dehydrogenase (lipoamide) phosphatase activity] |
| Cellular component | mitochondrial matrix; mitochondrion |
| Biological process | protein dephosphorylation; regulation of acetyl-CoA biosynthetic process from pyruvate; peptidyl-threonine dephosphorylation; positive regulation of pyruvate dehydrogenase activity |
Sources:Amigo / QuickGO
Orthologs
| Databases | NCBI: entry; OMA: entry |
| Species | Human | Mouse |
| Entrez | 54704 | 381511 |
| Ensembl | ENSG00000164951 | ENSMUSG00000049225 |
| UniProt | Q9P0J1 | Q3UV70 |
| RefSeq (mRNA) | NM_001161778; NM_001161779; NM_001161780; NM_001161781; NM_018444 | NM_001033453; NM_001098230; NM_001098231; NM_001290387; NM_001290391 |
| RefSeq (protein) | NP_001155251; NP_001155252; NP_001155253; NP_060914 | NP_001028625; NP_001091700; NP_001091701; NP_001277316; NP_001277320 |
| Location (UCSC) | Chr 8: 93.86 – 93.93 Mb | Chr 4: 11.96 – 11.97 Mb |
| PubMed search |
- Wikidata
| View/Edit Human | View/Edit Mouse |

Pyruvate dehydrogenase phosphatase catalytic subunit 1 (PDPC 1), also known as protein phosphatase 2C, is an enzyme that in humans is encoded by the PDP1 gene. PDPC 1 is an enzyme which serves to reverse the effects of pyruvate dehydrogenase kinase upon pyruvate dehydrogenase, activating pyruvate dehydrogenase.

== Function ==
Pyruvate dehydrogenase (E1) is one of the three components (E1, E2, and E3) of the large pyruvate dehydrogenase complex. Pyruvate dehydrogenase kinases catalyze phosphorylation of serine residues of E1 to inactivate the E1 component and inhibit the complex. Pyruvate dehydrogenase phosphatases catalyze the dephosphorylation and activation of the E1 component to reverse the effects of pyruvate dehydrogenase kinases.

Pyruvate dehydrogenase phosphatase is a heterodimer consisting of catalytic and regulatory subunits. Two catalytic subunits have been reported; one is predominantly expressed in skeletal muscle, and another one is much more abundant in the liver. The catalytic subunit, encoded by this gene, is the former, and belongs to the protein phosphatase 2C (PP2C) superfamily. Along with the pyruvate dehydrogenase complex and pyruvate dehydrogenase kinases, this enzyme is located in the mitochondrial matrix.

== Regulation ==
Pyruvate dehydrogenase phosphatase is stimulated by insulin, PEP, and AMP, but competitively inhibited by ATP, NADH, and Acetyl-CoA.

== Clinical significance ==
Mutation in the PDP1 gene causes pyruvate dehydrogenase phosphatase deficiency.
