= Isozyme =

Enzymes that differ in amino acid sequence but catalyze the same chemical reaction

In biochemistry, isozymes (also known as isoenzymes or more generally as multiple forms of enzymes or isoforms) are enzymes that differ in amino acid sequence but catalyze the same chemical reaction. Isozymes usually have different kinetic parameters (e.g. different K_{M} values), or are regulated differently. They permit the fine-tuning of metabolism to meet the particular needs of a given tissue or developmental stage.

In many cases, isozymes are encoded by homologous genes that have diverged over time. Strictly speaking, enzymes with different amino acid sequences that catalyse the same reaction are isozymes if encoded by different genes, or allozymes if encoded by different alleles of the same gene; the two terms are often used interchangeably.

== Introduction ==
Isozymes were first described by R. L. Hunter and Clement Markert (1957) who defined them as different variants of the same enzyme having identical functions and present in the same individual. This definition encompasses (1) enzyme variants that are the product of different genes and thus represent different loci (described as isozymes) and (2) enzymes that are the product of different alleles of the same gene (described as allozymes).

Isozymes are usually the result of gene duplication, but can also arise from polyploidisation or nucleic acid hybridization. Over evolutionary time, if the function of the new variant remains identical to the original, then it is likely that one or the other will be lost as mutations accumulate, resulting in a pseudogene. However, if the mutations do not immediately prevent the enzyme from functioning, but instead modify either its function, or its pattern of expression, then the two variants may both be favoured by natural selection and become specialised to different functions. For example, they may be expressed at different stages of development or in different tissues.

Allozymes may result from point mutations or from insertion-deletion (indel) events that affect the coding sequence of the gene. As with any other new mutations, there are three things that may happen to a new allozyme:

- It is most likely that the new allele will be non-functional—in which case it will probably result in low fitness and be removed from the population by natural selection.
- Alternatively, if the amino acid residue that is changed is in a relatively unimportant part of the enzyme (e.g., a long way from the active site), then the mutation may be selectively neutral and subject to genetic drift.
- In rare cases, the mutation may result in an enzyme that is more efficient, or one that can catalyse a slightly different chemical reaction, in which case the mutation may cause an increase in fitness, and be favoured by natural selection.

== Examples ==
An example of an isozyme is glucokinase, a variant of hexokinase which is not inhibited by glucose 6-phosphate. Its different regulatory features and lower affinity for glucose (compared to other hexokinases), allow it to serve different functions in cells of specific organs, such as control of insulin release by the beta cells of the pancreas, or initiation of glycogen synthesis by liver cells. Both these processes must only occur when glucose is abundant.

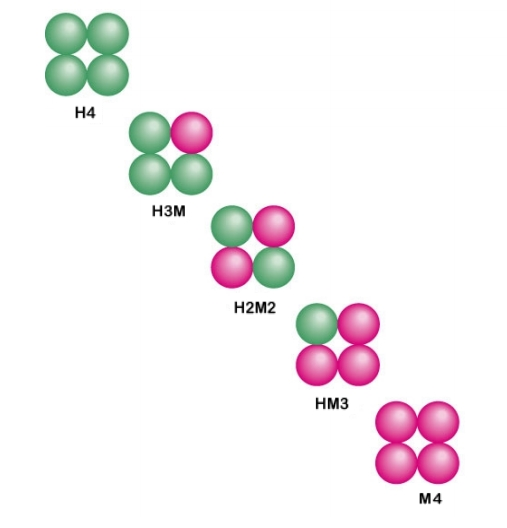
The 5 isozymes of LDH

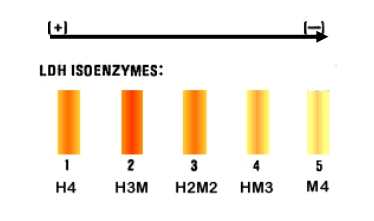
Distinction between five isozymes using electrophoresis

1.) The enzyme lactate dehydrogenase is a tetramer made of two different sub-units, the H-form and the M-form. These combine in different combinations depending on the tissue:

Type	Composition	Location	Electrophoretic Mobility	Whether destroyed by Heat (at 60 °C)	Percentage of normal serum in humans
LDH_{1}	HHHH	Heart and Erythrocyte	Fastest	No	25%
LDH_{2}	HHHM	Heart and Erythrocyte	Faster	No	35%
LDH_{3}	HHMM	Brain and Kidney	Fast	Partially	27%
LDH_{4}	HMMM	Skeletal Muscle and Liver	Slow	Yes	8%
LDH_{5}	MMMM	Skeletal Muscle and Liver	Slowest	Yes	5%

2.) Isoenzymes of creatine phosphokinase: Creatine kinase (CK) or creatine phosphokinase (CPK) catalyses the interconversion of phospho creatine to creatine .

CPK exists in 3 isoenzymes. Each isoenzymes is a dimer of 2 subunits M (muscle), B (brain) or both

Isoenzyme	Subunit	Tissue of Origin
CPK_{1}	BB	Brain
CPK_{2}	MB	Heart
CPK_{3}	MM	Skeletal muscle

3.) Isoenzymes of alkaline phosphatase: Six isoenzymes have been identified. The enzyme is a monomer, the isoenzymes are due to the differences in the carbohydrate content (sialic acid residues). The most important ALP isoenzymes are α_{1}-ALP, α_{2}-heat labile ALP, α_{2}-heat stable ALP, pre-β ALP and γ-ALP. Increase in α_{2}-heat labile ALP suggests hepatitis whereas pre-β ALP indicates bone diseases.

== Distinguishing isozymes ==
Isozymes (and allozymes) are variants of the same enzyme. Unless they are identical in their biochemical properties, for example their substrates and enzyme kinetics, they may be distinguished by a biochemical assay. However, such differences are usually subtle, particularly between allozymes which are often neutral variants. This subtlety is to be expected, because two enzymes that differ significantly in their function are unlikely to have been identified as isozymes.

While isozymes may be almost identical in function, they may differ in other ways. In particular, amino acid substitutions that change the electric charge of the enzyme are simple to identify by gel electrophoresis, and this forms the basis for the use of isozymes as molecular markers. To identify isozymes, a crude protein extract is made by grinding animal or plant tissue with an extraction buffer, and the components of extract are separated according to their charge by gel electrophoresis. Historically, this has usually been done using gels made from potato starch, but acrylamide gels provide better resolution.

All the proteins from the tissue are present in the gel, so that individual enzymes must be identified using an assay that links their function to a staining reaction. For example, detection can be based on the localised precipitation of soluble indicator dyes such as tetrazolium salts which become insoluble when they are reduced by cofactors such as NAD or NADP, which generated in zones of enzyme activity. This assay method requires that the enzymes are still functional after separation (native gel electrophoresis), and provides the greatest challenge to using isozymes as a laboratory technique.

Isoenzymes differ in kinetics (they have different K_{M} and V_{max} values).

== Isozymes and allozymes as molecular markers ==
Population genetics is essentially a study of the causes and effects of genetic variation within and between populations, and in the past, isozymes have been amongst the most widely used molecular markers for this purpose. Although they have now been largely superseded by more informative DNA-based approaches (such as direct DNA sequencing, single nucleotide polymorphisms and microsatellites), they are still among the quickest and cheapest marker systems to develop, and remain (as of 2005) an excellent choice for projects that only need to identify low levels of genetic variation, e.g. quantifying mating systems.

== Other major examples ==
- The cytochrome P450 isozymes play important roles in metabolism and steroidogenesis.
- The multiple forms of phosphodiesterase also play major roles in various biological processes. Although more than one form of these enzymes have been found in individual cells, these isoforms of the enzyme are unequally distributed in the various cells of an organism. From the clinical standpoint they have been found to be selectively activated and inhibited, an observation which has led to their use in therapy.
