= Pyruvate dehydrogenase (disambiguation) =

Pyruvate dehydrogenase is a type of enzyme.

Pyruvate dehydrogenase may specifically refer to:

- Pyruvate dehydrogenase (cytochrome)
- Pyruvate dehydrogenase (lipoamide) alpha 1
- Pyruvate dehydrogenase (lipoamide) alpha 2
- Pyruvate dehydrogenase (lipoamide) beta
- Pyruvate dehydrogenase (quinone)
- Pyruvate dehydrogenase (NADP+)
