= Claziprotamide =

Clinical data
- Other names: BBP-671

Identifiers
- IUPAC name: 1-[4-(6-chloropyridazin-3-yl)piperazin-1-yl]-2-(4-cyclopropyl-3-fluorophenyl)ethanone
- CAS Number: 2361124-03-8
- PubChem CID: 142616838
- ChemSpider: 129431674
- UNII: 74N47PKZ3K
- PDB ligand: Y92 (PDBe, RCSB PDB)

Chemical and physical data
- Formula: C_{19}H_{20}ClFN_{4}O
- Molar mass: 374.84 g·mol^{−1}
- 3D model (JSmol): Interactive image
- SMILES: C1CC1C2=C(C=C(C=C2)CC(=O)N3CCN(CC3)C4=NN=C(C=C4)Cl)F
- InChI: InChI=InChI=1S/C19H20ClFN4O/c20-17-5-6-18(23-22-17)24-7-9-25(10-8-24)19(26)12-13-1-4-15(14-2-3-14)16(21)11-13/h1,4-6,11,14H,2-3,7-10,12H2; Key:GGZFNPBICDFCKG-UHFFFAOYSA-N

Claziprotamide is an investigational new drug that is being evaluated for the treatment of rare metabolic disorders such as pantothenate kinase-associated neurodegeneration (PKAN) and neurodegeneration with brain iron accumulation (NBIA). It acts as a positive allosteric modulator (PAM) of pantothenate kinases 1 and 3 (PANK1 and PANK2) which are critical for coenzyme A biosynthesis and cellular metabolism.
