= Pyruvate dehydrogenase (lipoamide) alpha 2 =

Protein-coding gene in the species Homo sapiens

PDHA2

Identifiers
- Aliases: PDHA2, PDHAL, Pyruvate dehydrogenase (lipoamide) alpha 2, pyruvate dehydrogenase alpha 2, pyruvate dehydrogenase E1 alpha 2 subunit, pyruvate dehydrogenase E1 subunit alpha 2, SPGF70
- External IDs: OMIM: 179061; GeneCards: PDHA2
Enzyme activity
EC #	BRENDA	ExPASy	KEGG	MetaCyc
1.2.4.1	↗	↗	↗	↗

Gene location (Human)
Chr.	Chromosome 4 (human)
Band	4q22.3	Start	95,840,093 bp
Band	4q22.3	End	95,841,464 bp
RNA expression pattern
Bgee	Human / Mouse (ortholog); Top expressed in: sperm; left testis; right testis; testicle; tendon of biceps brachii; muscular system; muscle; muscle; skeletal muscle; lower limb muscles / n/a; More reference expression data
BioGPS	n/a
Gene ontology
Molecular function	oxidoreductase activity; pyruvate dehydrogenase (acetyl-transferring) activity; oxidoreductase activity, acting on the aldehyde or oxo group of donors, disulfide as acceptor; pyruvate dehydrogenase (NAD+) activity
Cellular component	intracellular membrane-bounded organelle; nucleus; nucleolus; mitochondrion; mitochondrial matrix; pyruvate dehydrogenase complex
Biological process	metabolism; tricarboxylic acid cycle; acetyl-CoA biosynthetic process from pyruvate; glucose metabolic process; pyruvate metabolic process; regulation of acetyl-CoA biosynthetic process from pyruvate; cellular nitrogen compound metabolic process; carbohydrate metabolic process
Sources:Amigo / QuickGO
Orthologs
Databases	NCBI: entry; OMA: entry
Species	Human	Mouse
Entrez	5161	n/a
Ensembl	ENSG00000163114	n/a
UniProt	P29803	n/a
RefSeq (mRNA)	NM_005390	n/a
RefSeq (protein)	NP_005381	n/a
Location (UCSC)	Chr 4: 95.84 – 95.84 Mb	n/a
PubMed search		n/a
- Wikidata
View/Edit Human

Pyruvate dehydrogenase (lipoamide) alpha 2, also known as pyruvate dehydrogenase E1 component subunit alpha, testis-specific form, mitochondrial or PDHE1-A type II, is an enzyme that in humans is encoded by the PDHA2 gene.

== Structure ==
Two mature PDHA proteins come together with two PDHB proteins to form a heterotetrameric E1 subunit. Crystal Structures allowed for a model in which the enzyme undergoes a 2-A shuttle-like motion of its heterodimers to perform the catalysis. The protein encoded by the human PDHA2 gene is part of the pyruvate dehydrogenase multienzyme complex. The entire human complex is 9.5 MDa in size, and has been described as 60-meric, meaning there are over 60 components that are assembled to make the entire complex. These subunits are conserved across many species, as the function of this complex is essential for the generation of ATP for all eukaryotes. Each component is responsible for the catalysis of one step in this pathway; this complex exists for the purpose of channeling the intermediates of each reaction to the next enzyme, thus greatly increasing the rate of reaction.

== Function ==
The pyruvate dehydrogenase complex is responsible for the oxidative decarboxylation of pyruvate, with the final product being Acetyl CoA. Overall the complex catalyzes five reactions, with the overall reaction being:

Pyruvate + CoA + NAD^{+} → acetyl-CoA + CO_{2}

There are three different coenzymes required throughout the 5 steps that this complex carries out: thiamine pyrophosphate (TPP), lipoamide, and coenzyme A. This step is only one of the central metabolic pathway carried out by eukaryotes, in which glucose is oxidized to form carbon dioxide, water, and ATP. The E1 complex specifically uses the TPP cofactor to cleave the Calpha-C(=O) bond of pyruvate, and then transfer the acetyl group to the TPP coenzyme, thus resulting in an intermediate, hydroxylethyl-Tpp*E1, and producing CO_{2}. The thiazolium ring on the TPP is ideal for adding to carbonyl groups and acting as an electron sink, or a group that can pull electrons from a reaction and stabilize an electron-deficient intermediate.

=== Regulation ===
The activity of the PDH complex in mammalian tissues is largely determined by the phosphorylation of certain subunits within the complex. As such, the absolute amounts of site-specific kinases and phosphates expressed in the mitochondria directly affect PDH activity.

As this gene is mostly inactive, save for in testis tissue, a methylation mechanism is in place that inactivates this gene in somatic cells. Removing the methyl group from the coding region has shown to activate the enzyme in vitro.

== Clinical significance ==
Mutations in the PDHA2 gene have been known to cause one form of pyruvate dehydrogenase deficiency. Pyruvate dehydrogenase deficiency is characterized by the buildup of a chemical called lactic acid in the body and a variety of neurological problems. Signs and symptoms of this condition usually first appear shortly after birth, and they can vary widely among affected individuals. The most common feature is a potentially life-threatening buildup of lactic acid (lactic acidosis), which can cause nausea, vomiting, severe breathing problems, and an abnormal heartbeat. People with pyruvate dehydrogenase deficiency usually have neurological problems as well. Most have delayed development of mental abilities and motor skills such as sitting and walking. Other neurological problems can include intellectual disability, seizures, weak muscle tone (hypotonia), poor coordination, and difficulty walking. Some affected individuals have abnormal brain structures, such as underdevelopment of the tissue connecting the left and right halves of the brain (corpus callosum), atrophy of the exterior part of the brain known as the cerebral cortex, or patches of damaged tissue (lesions) on some parts of the brain. Because of the severe health effects, many individuals with pyruvate dehydrogenase deficiency do not survive past childhood, although some may live into adolescence or adulthood. Mutations primarily manifest in the PDHA1 gene.

In women, this deficiency can be much harder to detect. This is because of the chance that there will be a skewed X inactivation pattern enzyme measurement in fibroblasts, meaning that the enzyme activity measurement may not be entirely accurate. Because the clinical presentation of this disorder overlaps heavily with deficiencies in oxidative phosphorylation, it is recommended to perform a detailed biochemical analysis on a muscle biopsy in females with a suspected pyruvate dehydrogenase deficiency, followed by molecular genetic analysis of the PDHA1 gene.

The methylation as a form of regulation shows promise as a therapy for those with PDH deficiency due to mutations in other genes, as the gene has been activated in vitro via demethylation.

== Interactive pathway map ==
Click on genes, proteins and metabolites below to link to respective articles. (Note: The interactive pathway map can be edited at WikiPathways: "GlycolysisGluconeogenesis_WP534".)

Glycolysis and Gluconeogenesis edit
