= PANK1 =

Protein-coding gene in the species Homo sapiens

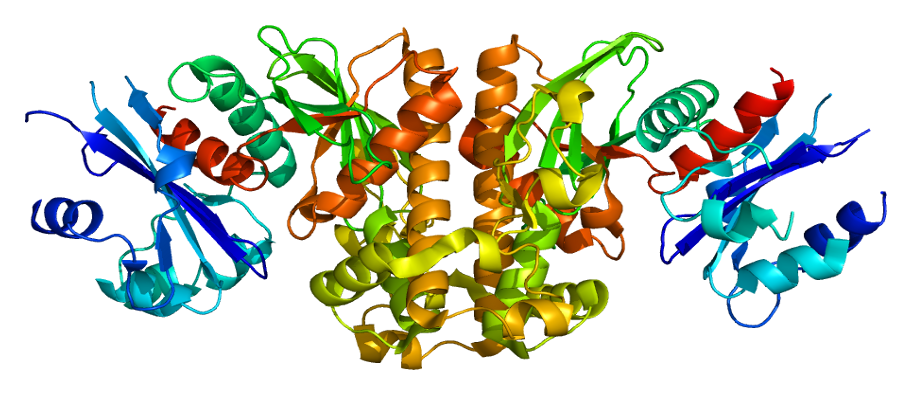

Identifiers
- Aliases: PANK1, PANK, pantothenate kinase 1
- External IDs: OMIM: 606160; MGI: 1922985; GeneCards: PANK1
Available structures
PDB	Ortholog search: PDBe RCSB
PDB	List of PDB id codes 2I7N, 3SMP
Enzyme activity
EC #	BRENDA	ExPASy	KEGG	MetaCyc
2.7.1.33	↗	↗	↗	↗

Gene location (Human)
Chr.	Chromosome 10 (human)
Band	10q23.31	Start	89,582,988 bp
Band	10q23.31	End	89,645,242 bp

Gene location (Mouse)
Chr.	Chromosome 19 (mouse)
Band	19 C1|19	Start	34,784,340 bp
Band	19 C1|19	End	34,856,855 bp
RNA expression pattern
Bgee	Human / Mouse (ortholog); Top expressed in: mucosa of ileum; jejunal mucosa; liver; right lobe of liver; renal medulla; mucosa of colon; mucosa of sigmoid colon; duodenum; skin of thigh; rectum / Top expressed in: proximal tubule; left lobe of liver; right kidney; human kidney; intercostal muscle; submandibular gland; soleus muscle; ciliary body; tunica adventitia of aorta; myocardium of ventricle; More reference expression data
BioGPS	n/a
Gene ontology
Molecular function	kinase activity; ATP binding; nucleotide binding; transferase activity; pantothenate kinase activity; protein homodimerization activity; acetyl-CoA binding
Cellular component	nucleus; clathrin coat; cell periphery; cytosol; recycling endosome; cytoplasm
Biological process	coenzyme A biosynthetic process; phosphorylation
Sources:Amigo / QuickGO
Orthologs
Databases	NCBI: entry; OMA: entry
Species	Human	Mouse
Entrez	53354	75735
Ensembl	ENSG00000152782	ENSMUSG00000033610
UniProt	Q8TE04	Q8K4K6
RefSeq (mRNA)	NM_138316; NM_148977; NM_148978	NM_001114339; NM_023792
RefSeq (protein)	NP_612189; NP_683878; NP_683879	NP_001107811; NP_076281
Location (UCSC)	Chr 10: 89.58 – 89.65 Mb	Chr 19: 34.78 – 34.86 Mb
PubMed search
- Wikidata
View/Edit Human	View/Edit Mouse

Pantothenate kinase 1 is an enzyme that in humans is encoded by the PANK1 gene.

This gene encodes a protein belonging to the pantothenate kinase family, which in mammals is made of up PANK1, PANK2, PANK3, and PANK4. Pantothenate kinase is a key regulatory enzyme in the biosynthesis of coenzyme A (CoA) in bacteria and mammalian cells. It catalyzes the first committed step in the universal biosynthetic pathway leading to CoA and is itself subject to regulation through feedback inhibition by CoA. Alternative splicing has been observed at this locus and three variants, each encoding a distinct isoform, have been identified.
