= Pyruvate dehydrogenase (quinone) =

Identifiers
- EC no.: 1.2.5.1

Databases
- IntEnz: IntEnz view
- BRENDA: BRENDA entry
- ExPASy: NiceZyme view
- KEGG: KEGG entry
- MetaCyc: metabolic pathway
- PRIAM: profile
- PDB structures: RCSB PDB PDBe PDBsum
Search
- PMC: articles
- PubMed: articles
- NCBI: proteins

Pyruvate dehydrogenase (quinone) (EC 1.2.5.1, pyruvate dehydrogenase, pyruvic dehydrogenase, pyruvic (cytochrome b1) dehydrogenase, pyruvate:ubiquinone-8-oxidoreductase, pyruvate oxidase (ambiguous)) is an enzyme with systematic name pyruvate:ubiquinone oxidoreductase. This enzyme catalyses the following chemical reaction

pyruvic acid
+ ubiquinone
H_{2}O
CO_{2}
H_{2}O
CO_{2}
acetic acid
+ ubiquinol

The enzyme converts pyruvic acid to acetic acid by oxidative decarboxylation using ubiquinone as its cofactor. This bacterial enzyme is a flavoprotein located on the inner surface of the cytoplasmic membrane.
