= Pyruvate dehydrogenase (NADP+) =

Identifiers
- EC no.: 1.2.1.51
- CAS no.: 93389-35-6

Databases
- BRENDA: enzyme data
- ExPASy: NiceZyme view
- KEGG: enzyme entry
- MetaCyc: metabolic pathway
- Rhea: reactions
- PDB structures: RCSB PDB PDBe PDBsum
- Gene Ontology: AmiGO / QuickGO
Search
- PMC: articles
- PubMed: articles
- NCBI: proteins

Pyruvate dehydrogenase (NADP^{+}) EC 1.2.1.51 is an enzyme that should not be confused with pyruvate dehydrogenase (acetyltransferase) EC 1.2.4.1.

It catalyzes the following reaction:

pyruvic acid
+ Coenzyme A + NADP^{+}
CO_{2} + H^{+}
CO_{2} + H^{+}
acetyl-CoA
+ NADPH
