= Pyruvate dehydrogenase (lipoamide) alpha 1 =

Protein-coding gene in the species Homo sapiens

PDHA1
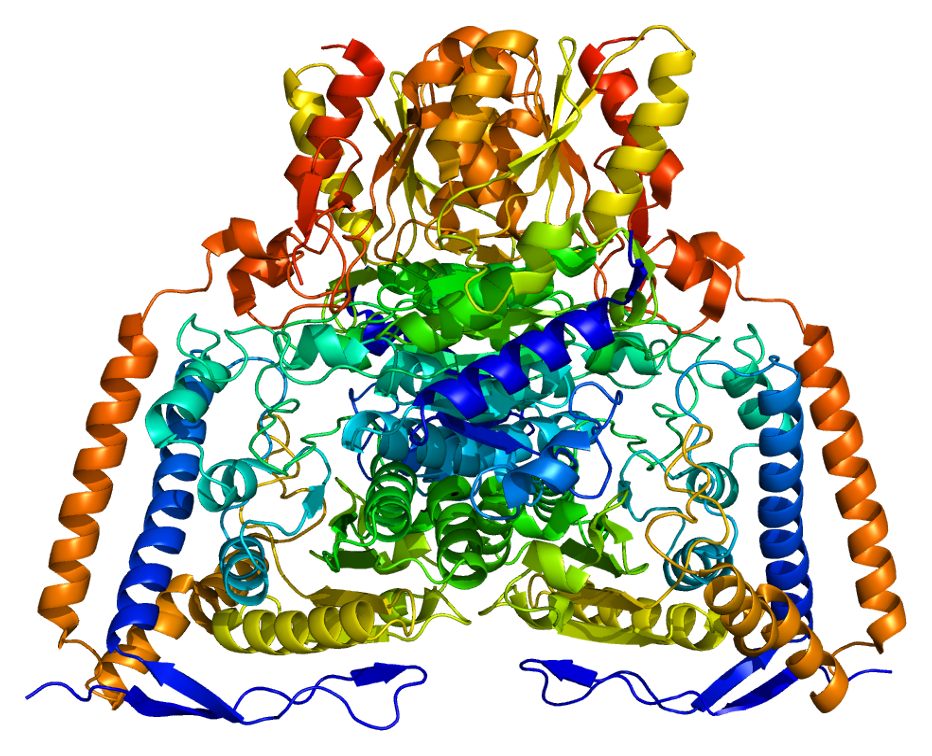

Identifiers
- Aliases: PDHA1, PDHA, PDHCE1A, PHE1A, PDHAD, Pyruvate dehydrogenase (lipoamide) alpha 1, pyruvate dehydrogenase alpha 1, pyruvate dehydrogenase E1 alpha 1 subunit, pyruvate dehydrogenase E1 subunit alpha 1
- External IDs: OMIM: 300502; MGI: 97532; GeneCards: PDHA1
Available structures
PDB	Ortholog search: PDBe RCSB
PDB	List of PDB id codes 1NI4, 2OZL, 3EXE, 3EXF, 3EXG, 3EXH, 3EXI
Enzyme activity
EC #	BRENDA	ExPASy	KEGG	MetaCyc
1.2.4.1	↗	↗	↗	↗

Gene location (Human)
Chr.	X chromosome (human)
Band	Xp22.12	Start	19,343,893 bp
Band	Xp22.12	End	19,361,718 bp

Gene location (Mouse)
Chr.	X chromosome (mouse)
Band	X F4|X 73.95 cM	Start	158,905,205 bp
Band	X F4|X 73.95 cM	End	158,921,409 bp
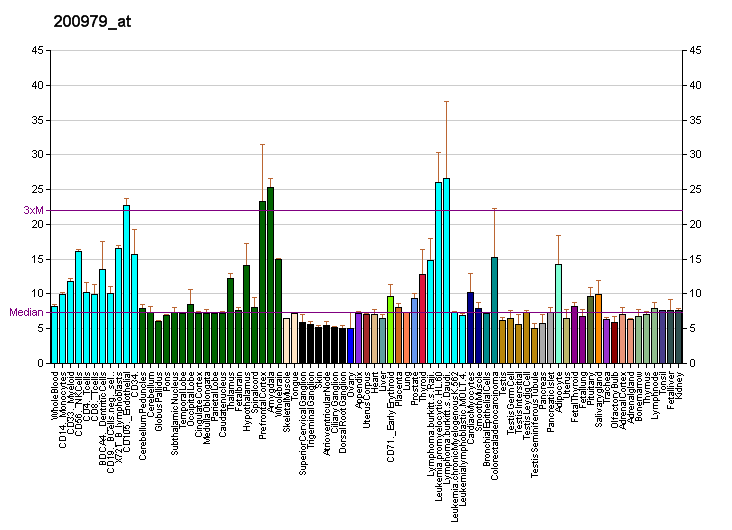

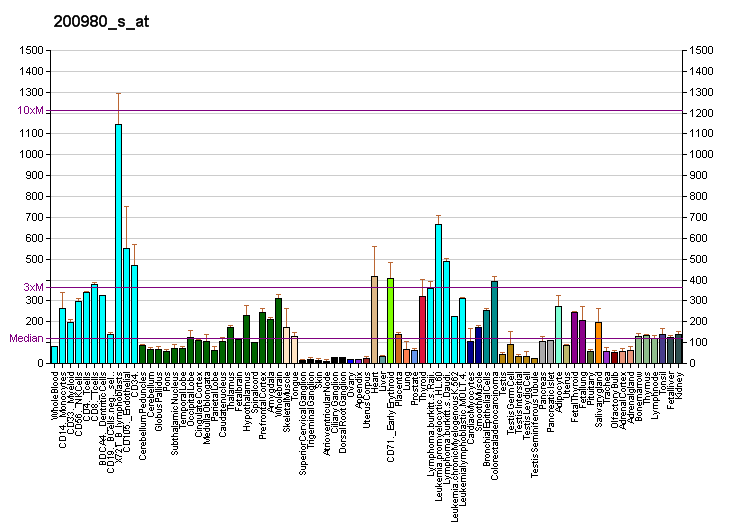
RNA expression pattern
Bgee	Human / Mouse (ortholog); Top expressed in: apex of heart; left ventricle; right auricle of heart; gastrocnemius muscle; muscle of thigh; mucosa of transverse colon; rectum; body of stomach; body of pancreas; right ventricle / Top expressed in: right ventricle; digastric muscle; sternocleidomastoid muscle; temporal muscle; extraocular muscle; myocardium of ventricle; triceps brachii muscle; brown adipose tissue; soleus muscle; interventricular septum; More reference expression data
BioGPS	More reference expression data
Gene ontology
Molecular function	pyruvate dehydrogenase activity; oxidoreductase activity; pyruvate dehydrogenase (acetyl-transferring) activity; oxidoreductase activity, acting on the aldehyde or oxo group of donors, disulfide as acceptor; pyruvate dehydrogenase (NAD+) activity; protein binding
Cellular component	intracellular membrane-bounded organelle; myelin sheath; pyruvate dehydrogenase complex; mitochondrial matrix; nucleus; nucleolus; mitochondrion
Biological process	mitochondrial acetyl-CoA biosynthetic process from pyruvate; tricarboxylic acid cycle; regulation of acetyl-CoA biosynthetic process from pyruvate; pyruvate metabolic process; glucose metabolic process; metabolism; acetyl-CoA biosynthetic process from pyruvate; cellular nitrogen compound metabolic process; carbohydrate metabolic process
Sources:Amigo / QuickGO
Orthologs
Databases	NCBI: entry; OMA: entry
Species	Human	Mouse
Entrez	5160	18597
Ensembl	ENSG00000131828	ENSMUSG00000031299
UniProt	P08559; Q5JPT9	P35486
RefSeq (mRNA)	NM_000284; NM_001173454; NM_001173455; NM_001173456	NM_008810
RefSeq (protein)	NP_000275; NP_001166925; NP_001166926; NP_001166927	NP_032836
Location (UCSC)	Chr X: 19.34 – 19.36 Mb	Chr X: 158.91 – 158.92 Mb
PubMed search
- Wikidata
View/Edit Human	View/Edit Mouse

Pyruvate dehydrogenase E1 component subunit alpha, somatic form, mitochondrial is an enzyme that in humans is encoded by the PDHA1 gene.The pyruvate dehydrogenase complex is a nuclear-encoded mitochondrial matrix multienzyme complex that provides the primary link between glycolysis and the tricarboxylic acid (TCA) cycle by catalyzing the irreversible conversion of pyruvate into acetyl-CoA. The PDH complex is composed of multiple copies of 3 enzymes: E1 (PDHA1); dihydrolipoyl transacetylase (DLAT) (E2; EC 2.3.1.12); and dihydrolipoyl dehydrogenase (DLD) (E3; EC 1.8.1.4). The E1 enzyme is a heterotetramer of 2 alpha and 2 beta subunits. The E1-alpha subunit contains the E1 active site and plays a key role in the function of the PDH complex.

== Structure ==
The PDHA1 gene has about 17 kilobase pairs; it contains 11 exons, which range from 61 to 174 base pairs, and introns, whose sizes range from 600 base pairs to 5.7 kilobase pairs. The splice donor and acceptor sites present within the gene all conform to GT/AC rule of splicing. The DNA sequence in the transcription initiation site is very GC-rich. There is a "TATA box"-like sequence and a "CAAT present upstream from the cap site. There are also several sets of repeats, sequences resembling the Sp1 transcription factor binding site, and two cAMP receptor binding sites upstream of the cap.

The preliminary peptide encoded by this gene was 29 amino acids at the very start of the sequence that correspond to a typical mitochondrial targeting leader sequence. The remaining 361 amino acids, starting at the N terminus with phenylalanine, represent the mature mitochondrial E1 alpha peptide. Two of these mature PDHA proteins come together with two PDHB proteins to form a heterotetrameric E1 subunit. Crystal Structures allowed for a model in which the enzyme undergoes a 2-A shuttle-like motion of its heterodimers to perform the catalysis. The protein encoded by the human PDHA1 gene is part of the pyruvate dehydrogenase multienzyme complex. The entire human complex is 9.5 MDa in size, and has been described as 60-meric, meaning there are over 60 components that are assembled to make the entire complex. These subunits are conserved across many species, as the function of this complex is essential for the generation of ATP for all eukaryotes. Each component is responsible for the catalysis of one step in this pathway; this complex exists for the purpose of channeling the intermediates of each reaction to the next enzyme, thus greatly increasing the rate of reaction.

== Function ==
The pyruvate dehydrogenase complex is responsible for the oxidative decarboxylation of pyruvate, with the final product being Acetyl CoA. Overall the complex catalyzes five reactions, with the overall reaction being:

Pyruvate + CoA + NAD^{+} → acetyl-CoA + CO_{2}

There are three different coenzymes required throughout the 5 steps that this complex carries out: thiamine pyrophosphate (TPP), lipoamide, and coenzyme A. This step is only one of the central metabolic pathway carried out by eukaryotes, in which glucose is oxidized to form carbon dioxide, water, and ATP. The E1 complex specifically uses the TPP cofactor to cleave the Calpha-C(=O) bond of pyruvate, and then transfer the acetyl group to the TPP coenzyme, thus resulting in an intermediate, hydroxylethyl-Tpp*E1, and producing CO_{2}. The thiazolium ring on the TPP is ideal for adding to carbonyl groups and acting as an electron sink, or a group that can pull electrons from a reaction and stabilize an electron-deficient intermediate.

=== Regulation ===
The activity of the PDH complex in mammalian tissues is largely determined by the phosphorylation of certain subunits within the complex. As such, the absolute amounts of site-specific kinases and phosphates expressed in the mitochondria directly affect PDH activity. Specifically, a tyrosine reside, Tyr-301, can be phosphorylated on PDHA1 and therefore inhibit its activity; this is done by blocking the substrate binding of pyruvate. This phosphorylation is in tandem with phosphorylation of the Ser-293 residue. Phosphorylation of another site, Ser-264, can regulate function. A phosphorylated serine residue at this position prevents TPP from ordering two loops within E1 that contain three phosphorylation sites. The disorder is the direct result of steric clash between the new phosphate group at Ser-264 and another serine, Ser-266, which destabilizes the hydrogen-bonding network that keeps the loops in place. Overall, this disorder results in the inactivation of the catalytic machinery.

The PDH complex can be regulated in a variety of conditions. The PDHA1 subunit has been shown to be regulated by free fatty acids during bouts of exercise. The presence of free fatty acids increases the level of phosphorylation, thereby decreasing PDH activity. During exercise, however, these effects are overruled, and there is a much higher level of dephosphorylated PDHA1 in the cells. In certain muscles, such as the triceps, the metabolic enzyme profile seems to directly affect the level of PDH activity, which can result in higher levels of lactate in muscles with these characteristics.

== Clinical significance ==
At least 71 disease-causing mutations in this gene have been discovered. Mutations in the PDHA1 gene have been known to cause one form of pyruvate dehydrogenase deficiency. Pyruvate dehydrogenase deficiency is characterized by the buildup of a chemical called lactic acid in the body and a variety of neurological problems. Signs and symptoms of this condition usually first appear shortly after birth, and they can vary widely among affected individuals. The most common feature is a potentially life-threatening buildup of lactic acid (lactic acidosis), which can cause nausea, vomiting, severe breathing problems, and an abnormal heartbeat. People with pyruvate dehydrogenase deficiency usually have neurological problems as well. Most have delayed development of mental abilities and motor skills such as sitting and walking. Other neurological problems can include intellectual disability, seizures, weak muscle tone (hypotonia), poor coordination, and difficulty walking. Some affected individuals have abnormal brain structures, such as underdevelopment of the tissue connecting the left and right halves of the brain (corpus callosum), wasting away (atrophy) of the exterior part of the brain known as the cerebral cortex, or patches of damaged tissue (lesions) on some parts of the brain. Because of the severe health effects, many individuals with pyruvate dehydrogenase deficiency do not survive past childhood, although some may live into adolescence or adulthood. Most cases result from mutations in this gene, and countless types of mutations have been identified. The mutations in this gene range from missense mutations, in which one nucleotide is substituted, to much larger deletions of many nucleotide base pairs.

While most of the clinical presentation is homogenous with the general disease, some cases have been identified in which there was focal dilatation of the right lateral ventricle with unilateral periventricular leukomalacia (PVL) with subependymal cyst.

In women, this deficiency can be much harder to detect. This is because of the chance that there will be a skewed X inactivation pattern enzyme measurement in fibroblasts, meaning that the enzyme activity measurement may not be entirely accurate. Because the clinical presentation of this disorder overlaps heavily with deficiencies in oxidative phosphorylation, it is recommended to perform a detailed biochemical analysis on a muscle biopsy in females with a suspected pyruvate dehydrogenase deficiency, followed by molecular genetic analysis of the PDHA1 gene.

== Interactive pathway map ==
Click on genes, proteins and metabolites below to link to respective articles. (Note: The interactive pathway map can be edited at WikiPathways: "GlycolysisGluconeogenesis_WP534".)

Glycolysis and Gluconeogenesis edit
