= Pyruvate dehydrogenase (lipoamide) beta =

Protein-coding gene in the species Homo sapiens

PDHB
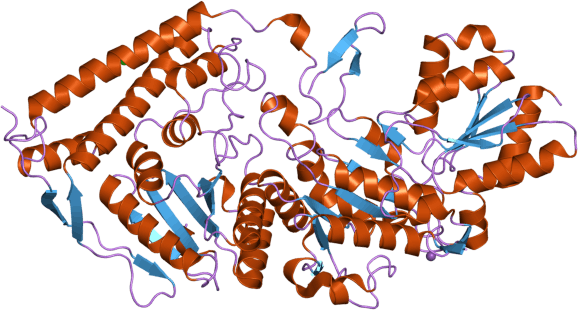

Identifiers
- Aliases: PDHB, PDHBD, PDHE1-B, PHE1B, Pyruvate dehydrogenase (lipoamide) beta, PDHE1B, pyruvate dehydrogenase E1 beta subunit, pyruvate dehydrogenase E1 subunit beta
- External IDs: OMIM: 179060; MGI: 1915513; GeneCards: PDHB
Available structures
PDB	Ortholog search: PDBe RCSB
PDB	List of PDB id codes 1NI4, 2OZL, 3EXE, 3EXF, 3EXG, 3EXH, 3EXI
Enzyme activity
EC #	BRENDA	ExPASy	KEGG	MetaCyc
1.2.4.1	↗	↗	↗	↗

Gene location (Human)
Chr.	Chromosome 3 (human)
Band	3p14.3	Start	58,427,630 bp
Band	3p14.3	End	58,433,857 bp

Gene location (Mouse)
Chr.	Chromosome 14 (mouse)
Band	14|14 A1	Start	14,296,748 bp
Band	14|14 A1	End	14,303,777 bp
RNA expression pattern
Bgee	Human / Mouse (ortholog); Top expressed in: endothelial cell; right ventricle; biceps brachii; Skeletal muscle tissue of rectus abdominis; Skeletal muscle tissue of biceps brachii; myocardium of left ventricle; body of tongue; deltoid muscle; Epithelium of choroid plexus; vastus lateralis muscle / Top expressed in: spermatocyte; muscle of thigh; neural layer of retina; yolk sac; spermatid; right kidney; morula; dentate gyrus of hippocampal formation granule cell; superior frontal gyrus; lip; More reference expression data
BioGPS	n/a
Gene ontology
Molecular function	pyruvate dehydrogenase activity; protein binding; catalytic activity; oxidoreductase activity; pyruvate dehydrogenase (acetyl-transferring) activity; pyruvate dehydrogenase (NAD+) activity
Cellular component	pyruvate dehydrogenase complex; nucleoplasm; mitochondrial matrix; mitochondrion; extracellular exosome; nucleus
Biological process	mitochondrial acetyl-CoA biosynthetic process from pyruvate; tricarboxylic acid cycle; regulation of acetyl-CoA biosynthetic process from pyruvate; pyruvate metabolic process; glucose metabolic process; metabolism; cellular nitrogen compound metabolic process; carbohydrate metabolic process; acetyl-CoA biosynthetic process from pyruvate
Sources:Amigo / QuickGO
Orthologs
Databases	NCBI: entry; OMA: entry
Species	Human	Mouse
Entrez	5162	68263
Ensembl	ENSG00000168291	ENSMUSG00000021748
UniProt	P11177	Q9D051
RefSeq (mRNA)	NM_000925; NM_001173468; NM_001315536	NM_024221
RefSeq (protein)	NP_000916; NP_001166939; NP_001302465	NP_077183
Location (UCSC)	Chr 3: 58.43 – 58.43 Mb	Chr 14: 14.3 – 14.3 Mb
PubMed search
- Wikidata
View/Edit Human	View/Edit Mouse

Pyruvate dehydrogenase (lipoamide) beta, also known as pyruvate dehydrogenase E1 component subunit beta, mitochondrial or PDHE1-B is an enzyme that in humans is encoded by the PDHB gene. The pyruvate dehydrogenase (PDH) complex is a nuclear-encoded mitochondrial multienzyme complex that catalyzes the overall conversion of pyruvate to acetyl-CoA and CO_{2}, and provides the primary link between glycolysis and the tricarboxylic acid (TCA) cycle. The PDH complex is composed of multiple copies of three enzymatic components: pyruvate dehydrogenase (E1), dihydrolipoamide acetyltransferase (E2) and lipoamide dehydrogenase (E3). The E1 enzyme is a heterotetramer of two alpha and two beta subunits. This gene encodes the E1 beta subunit. Mutations in this gene are associated with pyruvate dehydrogenase E1-beta deficiency.

== Structure ==
The PDH genes that comprise the E1 subunit are 1.36 kilobases long (alpha) and 1.69 kb long (beta). The PDHB gene has a total of 10 exons and 9 introns. All intron-exon splice junctions follow the standard GT/AG rule. There was an Alu family found in introns 2 and 8. The 5' flanking region gene contains a "CAAT" consensus promoter sequence but no "TATA" sequence. The transcription start site is an adenine residue located 132 bases upstream from the initiation codon in exon 1. The mRNA species that results from transcription of PDHB has been experimentally determined, via Northern blotting, to be 1.6 kb in length, although another fragment 5.5 kb long was also identified.

The PDHB gene encodes a precursor protein that has 359 amino acid residues and a final mature protein that has 329 amino acids, and is part of the pyruvate dehydrogenase multienzyme complex. Two of the mature PDHB proteins come together with two PDHA proteins to form a heterotetrameric E1 subunit. Crystal Structures allowed for a model in which the enzyme undergoes a 2-A shuttle-like motion of its heterodimers to perform the catalysis. Specifically, the catalytic residue has been identified on the PDHB subunit, the 89th residue, which is a glutamate. In forming the entire PDH complex, the 289th beta residue, aspartic acid, interacts with the 276th residue of the E2 complex, a lysine. The entire human complex is 9.5 MDa in size, and has been described as 60-meric, meaning there are over 60 components that are assembled to make the entire complex. These subunits are conserved across many species, as the function of this complex is essential for the generation of ATP for all eukaryotes. Each component is responsible for the catalysis of one step in this pathway; this complex exists for the purpose of channeling the intermediates of each reaction to the next enzyme, thus greatly increasing the rate of reaction.

== Function ==
The pyruvate dehydrogenase complex is responsible for the oxidative decarboxylation of pyruvate, with the final product being Acetyl CoA. Overall the complex catalyzes five reactions, with the overall reaction being:

Pyruvate + CoA + NAD^{+} → acetyl-CoA + CO_{2}

There are three different coenzymes required throughout the 5 steps that this complex carries out: thiamine pyrophosphate (TPP), lipoamide, and coenzyme A. This step is only one of the central metabolic pathway carried out by eukaryotes, in which glucose is oxidized to form carbon dioxide, water, and ATP. The E1 complex specifically uses the TPP cofactor to cleave the Calpha-C(=O) bond of pyruvate, and then transfer the acetyl group to the TPP coenzyme, thus resulting in an intermediate, hydroxylethyl-Tpp*E1, and producing CO_{2}. The thiazolium ring on the TPP is ideal for adding to carbonyl groups and acting as an electron sink, or a group that can pull electrons from a reaction and stabilize an electron-deficient intermediate. Additionally, PDHB interacts with Prolyl-hydroxylase PHD3 to regulate the cellular PDH activity.

== Clinical significance ==
Mutations in the PDHB gene have been known to cause one form of pyruvate dehydrogenase deficiency. Pyruvate dehydrogenase deficiency is characterized by the buildup of a chemical called lactic acid in the body and a variety of neurological problems. Signs and symptoms of this condition usually first appear shortly after birth, and they can vary widely among affected individuals. The most common feature is a potentially life-threatening buildup of lactic acid (lactic acidosis), which can cause nausea, vomiting, severe breathing problems, and an abnormal heartbeat. People with pyruvate dehydrogenase deficiency usually have neurological problems as well. Most have delayed development of mental abilities and motor skills such as sitting and walking. Other neurological problems can include intellectual disability, seizures, weak muscle tone (hypotonia), poor coordination, and difficulty walking. Some affected individuals have abnormal brain structures, such as underdevelopment of the tissue connecting the left and right halves of the brain (corpus callosum), wasting away (atrophy) of the exterior part of the brain known as the cerebral cortex, or patches of damaged tissue (lesions) on some parts of the brain. Because of the severe health effects, many individuals with pyruvate dehydrogenase deficiency do not survive past childhood, although some may live into adolescence or adulthood. Most cases of pyruvate dehydrogenase complex (PDHc) deficiency are attributable to mutations in the PDHA1 gene which encodes the E(1)α subunit, with few cases of mutations in the genes for E3, E3BP, and E2 being described. However, there are a few cases in which mutations in the beta subunit gene have resulted in patients with Leigh syndrome. Many pathological mutations have been described, including: R36C, which results in conformational change due to increased amino acid interactions; C306R, overall affecting interaction of the two beta subunits; I142M, affecting conformation around a potassium ion, thereby reducing PDHB stability; W165S, which also affects hydrophobic interaction between the beta subunits; and Y132C. Other cases have been described in which there are no pathological mutations, but inborn errors of metabolism, specifically related to ubiquitination and proteasome machineries, resulted in a PDHB deficiency. This was demonstrated by PDH activity being restored in cells that were treated with MG132, which is known as proteasome inhibitor. The clinical manifestations of this deficiency are similar to those of PDHA1 deficiency, with the exception being that ataxia is less frequent in these cases, and that consanguinity was found only in families with the PDHB deficiency.

== Interactive pathway map ==
Click on genes, proteins and metabolites below to link to respective articles. (Note: The interactive pathway map can be edited at WikiPathways: "GlycolysisGluconeogenesis_WP534".)

Glycolysis and Gluconeogenesis edit
