= Oxidative decarboxylation =

Chemical reaction

Oxidative decarboxylation is a decarboxylation reaction caused by oxidation.

== Organic chemistry ==
Lead tetraacetate converts carboxylic acids to alkenes.

RCH_{2}CH_{2}CO_{2}H + Pb(O_{2}CCH_{3})_{4} → RCH=CH_{2} + CO_{2} + 2 HO_{2}CCH_{3} + Pb(O_{2}CCH_{3})_{2}

== Biochemical context ==
Most are accompanied by α-ketoglutarate α-decarboxylation caused by dehydrogenation of hydroxyl carboxylic acids such as carbonyl carboxylic malic acid, isocitric acid, etc.

Pyruvate is susceptible to oxidative decarboxylation to deliver the equivalent of the acetyl anion:

CH_{3}C(O)CO^{−}_{2} → "CH_{3}CO^{−}" + CO_{2}

This irreversible reaction is catalyzed by the pyruvate dehydrogenase complex. It consists of three enzymes: pyruvate dehydrogenase (E1), dihydrolipoamide acetyltransferase (E2), dihydrolipoamide dehydrogenase (E3), six cofactors: thiamine pyrophosphate (TPP), lipoamide, coenzyme A (CoA), flavin adenine dinucleotide (FAD), magnesium ion, and one co-substrate: nicotinamide adenine dinucleotide (NAD+). Pyruvate converts the thiazole ring of TPP to its hydroxyethyl derivative, concomitant with decarboxylation. With the catalysis of E2, TPP-CH(OH)CH_{3} reacts with the S-S bond of lipoamide to produce thioester bond (acetyl dihydrolipoamide. The acetyl reacts with CoA-SH to give Acetyl-CoA and dihydrolipoamide. The latter is oxidized to lipoamide (with S-S bond) by FAD.

=== Glycolysis and the citric acid cycle ===
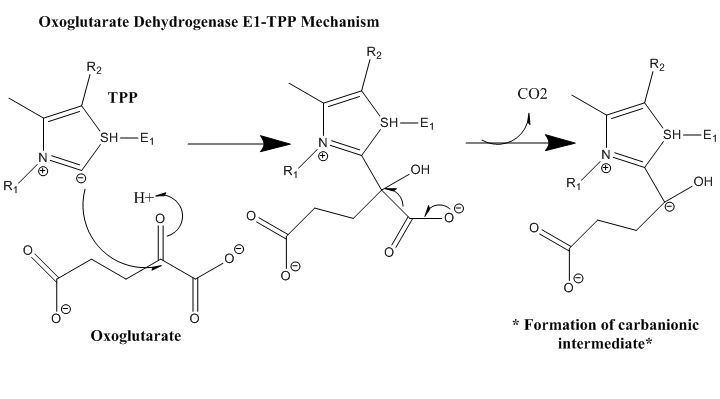

Pyruvate, the product of glycolysis under aerobic conditions, is a metabolic branch point. As a preliminary to following the central path of aerobic metabolism from glycolysis to the citric acid cycle, we put pyruvate in perspective by considering its various possible fates. We also consider the broader context of common carboxylation and decarboxylation reactions in biochemistry.
