= Pyruvate dehydrogenase (cytochrome) =

pyruvate dehydrogenase (cytochrome)

Identifiers
- EC no.: 1.2.2.2
- CAS no.: 9079-84-9

Databases
- BRENDA: enzyme data
- ExPASy: NiceZyme view
- KEGG: enzyme entry
- MetaCyc: metabolic pathway
- Rhea: reactions
- PDB structures: RCSB PDB PDBe PDBsum
- Gene Ontology: AmiGO / QuickGO
Search
- PMC: articles
- PubMed: articles
- NCBI: proteins

In enzymology, a pyruvate dehydrogenase (cytochrome) (EC 1.2.2.2) is an enzyme that catalyzes the chemical reaction

pyruvate + ferricytochrome b_{1} + H_{2}O $\rightleftharpoons$ acetate + CO_{2} + ferrocytochrome b_{1}

The 3 substrates of this enzyme are pyruvate, ferricytochrome b1, and H_{2}O, whereas its 3 products are acetate, CO_{2}, and ferrocytochrome b1.

This enzyme belongs to the family of oxidoreductases, specifically those acting on the aldehyde or oxo group of donor with a cytochrome as acceptor. The systematic name of this enzyme class is pyruvate:ferricytochrome-b1 oxidoreductase. Other names in common use include pyruvate dehydrogenase, pyruvic dehydrogenase, pyruvic (cytochrome b1) dehydrogenase, pyruvate:ubiquinone-8-oxidoreductase, and pyruvate oxidase (ambiguous). This enzyme participates in pyruvate metabolism. It has 2 cofactors: FAD, and Thiamin diphosphate.
