= PANK4 =

Protein-coding gene in humans

Identifiers
- Aliases: PANK4, pantothenate kinase 4, pantothenate kinase 4 (inactive), CTRCT49
- External IDs: OMIM: 606162; MGI: 2387466; GeneCards: PANK4

Gene location (Human)
Chr.	Chromosome 1 (human)
Band	1p36.32	Start	2,508,537 bp
Band	1p36.32	End	2,526,597 bp

Gene location (Mouse)
Chr.	Chromosome 4 (mouse)
Band	4|4 E2	Start	155,048,580 bp
Band	4|4 E2	End	155,065,395 bp
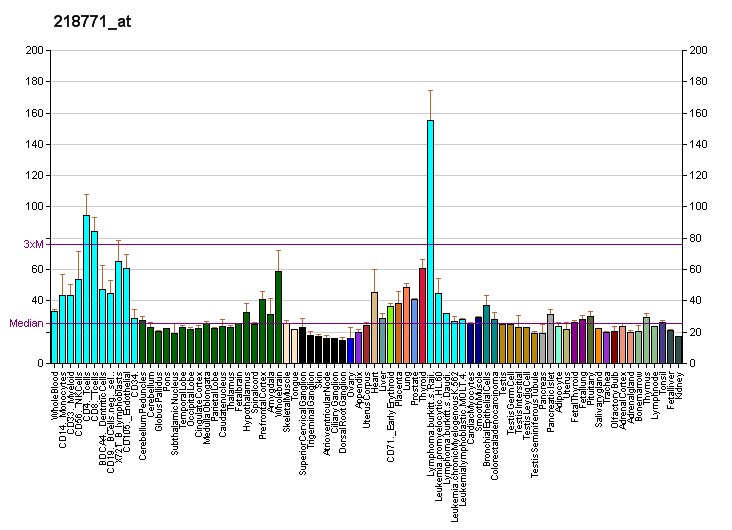
RNA expression pattern
Bgee	Human / Mouse (ortholog); Top expressed in: apex of heart; right hemisphere of cerebellum; blood; granulocyte; gastrocnemius muscle; skeletal muscle tissue; left ventricle; right auricle of heart; muscle of thigh; pituitary gland / Top expressed in: neural layer of retina; interventricular septum; extraocular muscle; otic vesicle; digastric muscle; vastus lateralis muscle; soleus muscle; temporal muscle; retinal pigment epithelium; muscle of thigh; More reference expression data
BioGPS	More reference expression data
Gene ontology
Molecular function	transferase activity; nucleotide binding; pantothenate kinase activity; ATP binding; kinase activity
Cellular component	cytoplasm
Biological process	coenzyme A biosynthetic process; phosphorylation
Sources:Amigo / QuickGO
Orthologs
Databases	NCBI: entry; OMA: entry
Species	Human	Mouse
Entrez	55229	269614
Ensembl	ENSG00000157881; ENSG00000273494	ENSMUSG00000029056
UniProt	Q9NVE7	Q80YV4
RefSeq (mRNA)	NM_018216	NM_172990; NM_001305804
RefSeq (protein)	NP_060686	NP_001292733; NP_766578; NP_001392980; NP_001392981; NP_001392982 NP_001392983; NP_001392984; NP_001392985
Location (UCSC)	Chr 1: 2.51 – 2.53 Mb	Chr 4: 155.05 – 155.07 Mb
PubMed search
- Wikidata
View/Edit Human	View/Edit Mouse

Pantothenate kinase 4 is an enzyme (pantothenate kinase) that in humans is encoded by the PANK4 gene.

This gene encodes a protein belonging to the pantothenate kinase family. Pantothenate kinase is a key regulatory enzyme in the biosynthesis of coenzyme A (CoA) in bacteria and mammalian cells. It catalyzes the first committed step in the universal biosynthetic pathway leading to CoA and is itself subject to regulation through feedback inhibition by CoA. This family member is most abundant in muscle but is expressed in all tissues.

== See also ==
- Pantothenate
