= Pantothenate kinase-associated neurodegeneration =

Genetic neurodegenerative disease with brain iron accumulation

- Other names: Neurodegeneration with brain iron accumulation 1
- Pantetheine
- Specialty: Neurology
- Symptoms: Dystonia, parkinsonism, dementia
- Usual onset: Under 10 years (classical), Over 10 years (atypical)
- Types: Classical, atypical
- Causes: PANK2 mutation
- Frequency: 1–3 per 1 million people

Pantothenate kinase-associated neurodegeneration (PKAN), formerly called Hallervorden–Spatz syndrome, is a genetic degenerative disease of the brain that can lead to parkinsonism, dystonia, dementia, and ultimately death. Neurodegeneration in PKAN is accompanied by an excess of iron that progressively builds up in the brain.

PKAN is caused by loss of function of the enzyme PANK2, due to bi-allelic genetic mutations. It follows autosomal recessive inheritance. This enzyme is the first step in the pathway converting vitamin B5 into coenzyme A. There are currently no treatments that modify disease progress, though there are a number of medications and therapies that can help improve symptoms and there is active research into treatments.

== Signs and symptoms ==
Symptoms typically begin in childhood and are progressive, often resulting in death by early adulthood. Symptoms of PKAN begin before middle childhood, and most often are noticed before ten years of age. Symptoms include:

- dystonia (repetitive uncontrollable muscle contractions that may cause jerking or twisting of certain muscle groups)
- dysphagia & dysarthria due to muscle groups involved in speech being involved
- rigidity/stiffness of limbs
- tremor
- writhing movements
- dementia
- spasticity
- weakness
- seizures (rare)
- toe walking
- retinitis pigmentosa, another degenerative disease that affects the individual's retina, often causing alteration of retinal color and progressive deterioration of the retina at first causing night blindness and later resulting in a complete loss of vision.

25% of individuals experience an uncharacteristic form of PKAN that develops post-10 years of age and follows a slower, more gradual pace of deterioration than those pre-10 years of age. These individuals face significant speech deficits as well as psychiatric and behavioral disturbances.

Being a progressive, degenerative nerve illness, PKAN leads to early immobility and often death by early adulthood. Death occurs prematurely due to infections such as pneumonia, and the disease in itself is technically not life limiting.

== Genetics ==
PKAN is an autosomal recessive disorder. Both the parents of an affected child must be heterozygous carriers for the disease and therefore must carry one mutant allele. As it is an autosomal disorder, those heterozygous for the disorder may not display any atypical characteristics that are considered suggestive of the disorder, however there have been reported cases of compound heterozygosity in which heterozygous individuals do develop the classic form of the disease.

The disorder is caused by a mutant PANK2 gene located at the chromosomal locus: 20p13-p12.3. PANK2 is responsible for coding the protein Pantothenate kinase 2. PANK2 encodes the enzyme pantothenate kinase, and mutations in the gene lead to an inborn error of vitamin B5 (pantothenate) metabolism. Vitamin B5 is required for the production of coenzyme A in cells. Disruption of this enzyme affects energy and lipid metabolism and may lead to accumulation of potentially harmful compounds in the brain, including iron.

PANK2 encodes a 1.85Kb transcript which is derived from seven exons covering a total distance of approximately 3.5Mb of genomic DNA. The PANK2 gene also encodes a 50.5-kDaprotein that is a functional pantothenate kinase, an essential regulatory enzyme in coenzyme A (CoA) biosynthesis, and catalyzing the phosphorylation of pantothenate (vitamin B_{5}), N-pantothenoyl-cysteine, and pantetheine (OMIM).

Mutant PANK2 gene coded proteins are often caused by null or missense mutations most notably a 7bp deletion in the PANK2 gene coding sequence.

This disorder has been reported in specific communities based on intra-community marriages where both parents of the child are carrying the same mutation. One of the communities reported is Agrawal (Agarwal) Community mainly based in Northern Part of India. The known mutation in Agarwal community is pathogenic mutation 1c.215_216insA in PANK2 gene. This is also coded as chr20:3870292-3870293insA by some labs. It results in a frameshift and premature truncation of the protein 47 amino acids downstream to codon 183 (p.Arg183GlufsTer47; ENST00000316562).

== Diagnosis ==
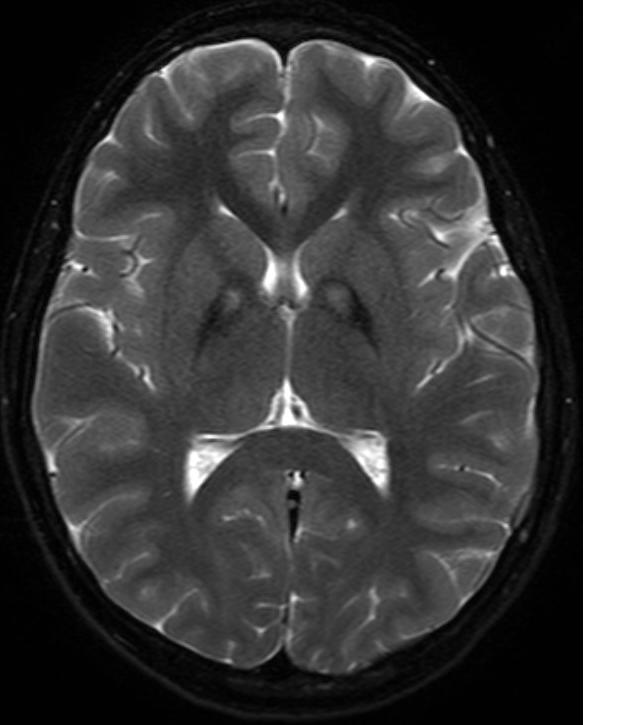
MRI image shows iron deposits in the basal ganglia, the so-called eye-of-the-tiger sign (T2w GRASE sequence).

A neurological examination would show evidence of muscle rigidity; weakness; and abnormal postures, movements, and tremors. If other family members are also affected, this may help determine the diagnosis. Genetic tests can confirm an abnormal gene causing the disease. However, this test is not yet widely available. Other movement disorders and diseases must be ruled out. Individuals exhibiting any of the above listed symptoms are often tested using MRI (Magnetic Resonance Imaging) for a number of neuro-related disorders. An MRI usually shows iron deposits in the basal ganglia. Development of diagnostic criteria continues in the hope of further separating PKAN from other forms of neurodegenerative diseases featuring NBIA.

=== Neuropathology ===
Microscopic features of PKAN include high levels of iron in the globus pallidus and the pars reticulata of substantia nigra, evident as a characteristic rust-brown discoloration in a pattern called the eye-of-the-tiger sign; lipofuscin and neuromelanin concentrated in the iron-accumulating areas; oval, nonnucleated structures representing swollen axons whose cytoplasm swells with vacuoles, referred to as spheroids, axon schollen, or neuroaxonal dystrophy; and Lewy bodies.

== Treatment ==
Phosphopantothenate has been shown to treat PKAN in a human by slowing down its progress, and also in a mouse model of the disease. However, there is no cure for PKAN. Pantethine (a precursor of pantetheine) has been studied and shown to be effective in a mouse and in a fruit fly model of the disease.

== Prognosis ==
Survival rates for those diagnosed with typical PKAN, and left untreated is 11.18 years with a standard deviation of 7.8 years. A study reporting good outcomes in a single patient with late onset PKAN has been performed.

== Epidemiology ==
Prevalence data regarding this disorder remains incomplete, however it is estimated that anywhere between 1 in 1,000,000 to 3 in 1,000,000 individuals will be affected by this disorder (based upon observed cases in a population), but once again this is only an estimate as the disease is so rare it is difficult to statistically and accurately ascertain.

== History ==
PKAN was first described in 1922 by later-Nazi neuroscientists Julius Hallervorden and Hugo Spatz, who would become infamous for their experimentation on the brains of euthanized victims of the Holocaust. Their discovery was brought about by a diagnosis of a family of 12 in which five sisters exhibited progressively increasing dementia and dysarthria. Autopsies revealed brown discolorations in different areas of the brain (particularly of interest were the globus pallidus and substantia nigra regions). Further investigation and description was brought about by Meyer (1958) who diagnosed 30 separate cases of PKAN. Meyer (1958) was followed by Elejalde et al. (1978) who described 5 affected family members and hypothesized that the disorder originated in central Europe, supporting the hypothesis with clinical and genetic analysis. Further investigation and insights were provided by Malmstrom-Groth and Kristensson (1982) and Jankovic et al. (1985).

Diagnosis of PKAN hit a milestone with the availability of MRIs, as well as the in-depth descriptions of those MRIs provided by Littrup and Gebarski (1985), Tanfani et al. (1987), Sethi et al. (1988), Angelini et al. (1992), Casteels et al. (1994), and Malandrini et al. (1995). The gene was localized to chromosome 20p by Taylor et al. (1996) who suggested that this disorder should be referred to as neurodegeneration with brain iron accumulation (NBIA1) to avoid the objectionable eponym of Hallervorden-Spatz. The disease was renamed 'pantothenate kinase-associated neurodegeneration' or PKAN by Zhou et al. (2001) who suggested the name to avoid misinterpretation and to better reflect the true nature of the disorder. Most recently Pellecchia et al. (2005) published a report of 16 patients affected by PKAN, confirmed by genetic analysis.
