= PANK2 =

Protein-coding gene in the species Homo sapiens

Identifiers
- Aliases: PANK2, C20orf48, HARP, HSS, NBIA1, PKAN, pantothenate kinase 2
- External IDs: OMIM: 606157; MGI: 1921700; GeneCards: PANK2
Available structures
PDB	Ortholog search: PDBe RCSB
PDB	List of PDB id codes 5E26
Enzyme activity
EC #	BRENDA	ExPASy	KEGG	MetaCyc
2.7.1.33	↗	↗	↗	↗

Gene location (Human)
Chr.	Chromosome 20 (human)
Band	20p13	Start	3,888,839 bp
Band	20p13	End	3,929,887 bp

Gene location (Mouse)
Chr.	Chromosome 2 (mouse)
Band	2|2 F1	Start	131,104,415 bp
Band	2|2 F1	End	131,141,108 bp
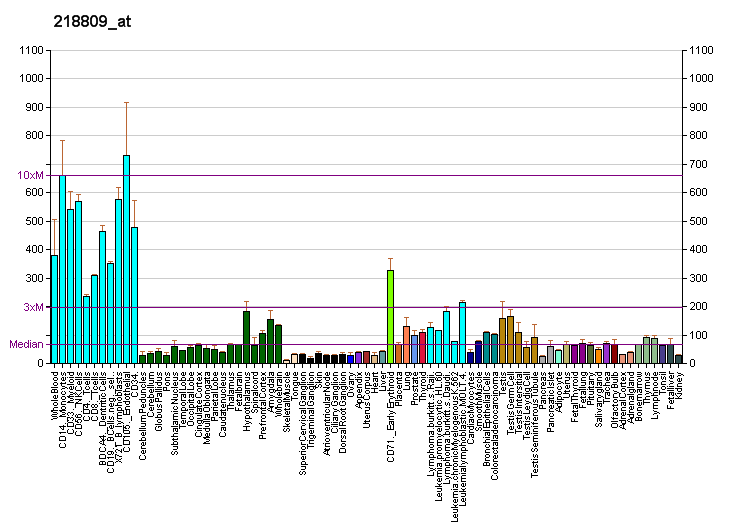
RNA expression pattern
Bgee	Human / Mouse (ortholog); Top expressed in: endothelial cell; stromal cell of endometrium; monocyte; Brodmann area 23; granulocyte; blood; middle temporal gyrus; gingival epithelium; Descending thoracic aorta; sperm / Top expressed in: spermatid; spermatocyte; cumulus cell; tail of embryo; Paneth cell; ventricular zone; condyle; fossa; endothelial cell of lymphatic vessel; hand; More reference expression data
BioGPS	More reference expression data
Gene ontology
Molecular function	transferase activity; nucleotide binding; kinase activity; ATP binding; pantothenate kinase activity; protein binding
Cellular component	mitochondrial intermembrane space; mitochondrion; cytoplasm; cytosol; nucleus
Biological process	regulation of bile acid metabolic process; phosphorylation; coenzyme A biosynthetic process; regulation of mitochondrial membrane potential; aerobic dissimilation; regulation of triglyceride metabolic process; regulation of fatty acid metabolic process; spermatid development; mitochondrion morphogenesis; pantothenate metabolic process
Sources:Amigo / QuickGO
Orthologs
Databases	NCBI: entry; OMA: entry
Species	Human	Mouse
Entrez	80025	74450
Ensembl	ENSG00000125779	ENSMUSG00000037514
UniProt	Q9BZ23; Q6P1K9	Q7M753
RefSeq (mRNA)	NM_024960; NM_153637; NM_153638; NM_153639; NM_153640 NM_153641; NM_001324191; NM_001324192; NM_001324193; NM_001386393	NM_153501; NM_001355679; NM_001355681; NM_001355682; NM_001355683
RefSeq (protein)	NP_001311120; NP_001311121; NP_001311122; NP_079236; NP_705902 NP_705904; NP_705904.1	NP_001342608; NP_001342610; NP_001342611; NP_001342612; NP_705721
Location (UCSC)	Chr 20: 3.89 – 3.93 Mb	Chr 2: 131.1 – 131.14 Mb
PubMed search
- Wikidata
View/Edit Human	View/Edit Mouse

Pantothenate kinase 2, mitochondrial is an enzyme that in humans is encoded by the PANK2 gene.

This gene encodes a protein belonging to the pantothenate kinase family and is the only member of that family to be expressed in mitochondria. Pantothenate kinase is a key regulatory enzyme in the biosynthesis of coenzyme A (CoA) in bacteria and mammalian cells. It catalyzes the first committed step in the universal biosynthetic pathway leading to CoA and is itself subject to regulation through feedback inhibition by acyl CoA species. Mutations in this gene are associated with HARP (Hypoprebetalipoproteinemia, Acanthocytosis, Retinitis Pigmentosa and Pallidal degeneration) syndrome and Pantothenate kinase-associated neurodegeneration (PKAN). Alternative splicing, involving the use of alternate first exons, results in multiple transcripts encoding different isoforms.
