= Pyruvate dehydrogenase =

Class of enzymes

pyruvate dehydrogenase (acetyl-transferring)
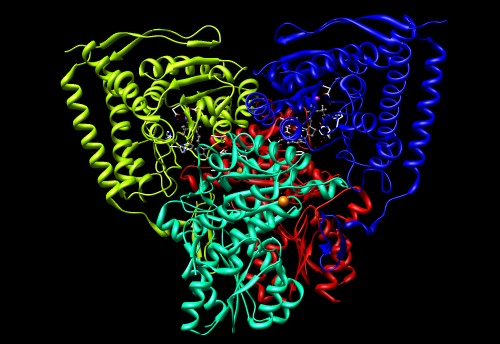
- Crystallographic structure of pyruvate dehydrogenase (PDH). PH is a six domain dimer with α (blue), α’ (yellow), β (red), and β’ (teal) regions denoted by the different colors. Thiamine pyrophosphate (TPP) is shown in grey ball and stick form, two magnesium ions in purple undergoing metal ligation with the TPP, and two potassium ions in orange.

Identifiers
- EC no.: 1.2.4.1
- CAS no.: 9014-20-4

Databases
- BRENDA: enzyme data
- ExPASy: NiceZyme view
- KEGG: enzyme entry
- MetaCyc: metabolic pathway
- Rhea: reactions
- PDB structures: RCSB PDB PDBe PDBsum
- Gene Ontology: AmiGO / QuickGO
Search
- PMC: articles
- PubMed: articles
- NCBI: proteins

Pyruvate dehydrogenase is an enzyme that catalyzes the reaction of pyruvate and a lipoamide to give the acetylated dihydrolipoamide and carbon dioxide. The conversion requires the coenzyme thiamine pyrophosphate.

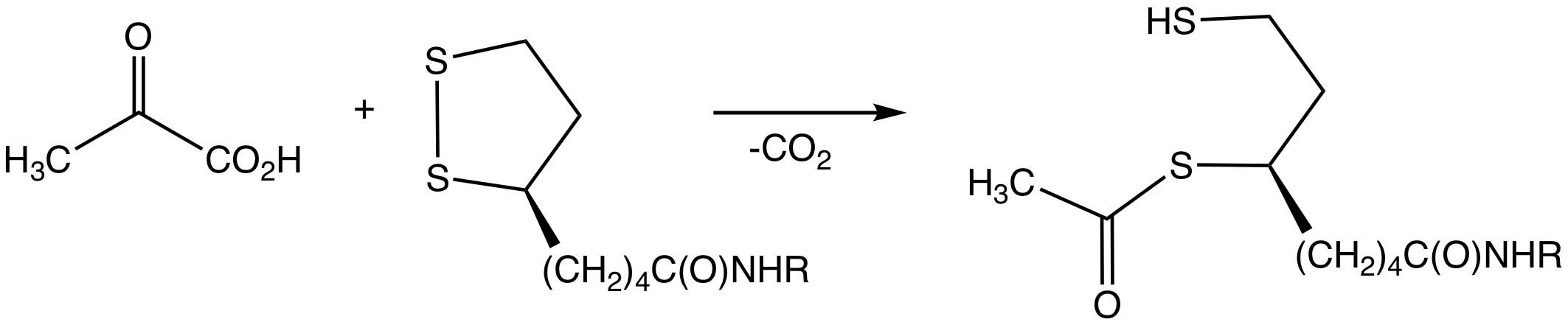

Pyruvate dehydrogenase is usually encountered as a component, referred to as E1, of the pyruvate dehydrogenase complex (PDC). PDC consists of other enzymes, referred to as E2 and E3. Collectively E1-E3 transform pyruvate, NAD^{+}, coenzyme A into acetyl-CoA, CO_{2}, and NADH. The conversion is crucial because acetyl-CoA may then be used in the citric acid cycle to carry out cellular respiration. To distinguish between this enzyme and the PDC, it is systematically called pyruvate dehydrogenase (acetyl-transferring).

== Mechanism ==
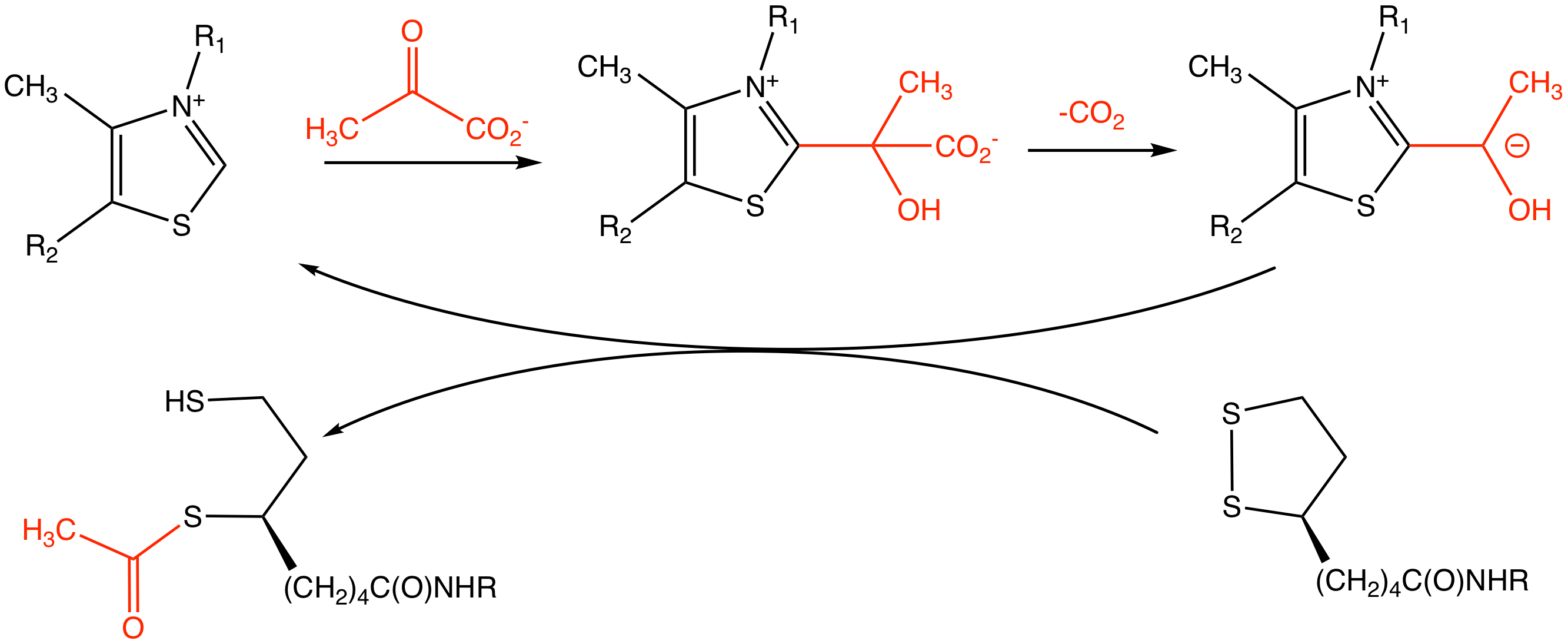
Simplified mechanism for pyruvate dehydrogenase reaction. The TPP coenzyme is shown with abbreviated substituents.

The thiamine pyrophosphate (TPP) converts to an ylide by deprotonation. The ylide attacks the ketone group of pyruvate. The resulting adduct decarboxylates. The resulting 1,3-dipole reductively acetylates lipoamide-E2.

In terms of details, biochemical and structural data for E1 revealed a mechanism of activation of TPP coenzyme by forming the conserved hydrogen bond with glutamate residue (Glu59 in human E1) and by imposing a V-conformation that brings the N4’ atom of the aminopyrimidine to intramolecular hydrogen bonding with the thiazolium C2 atom. This unique combination of contacts and conformations of TPP leads to formation of the reactive C2-carbanion, eventually. After the cofactor TPP decarboxylates pyruvate, the acetyl portion becomes a hydroxyethyl derivative covalently attached to TPP.

== Structure ==
E1 is a multimeric protein. Mammalian E1s, including human E1, are tetrameric, composed of two α- and two β- subunits. Some bacterial E1s, including E1 from Escherichia coli, are composed of two similar subunits, each being as large as the sum of molecular masses of α- and β- subunits.

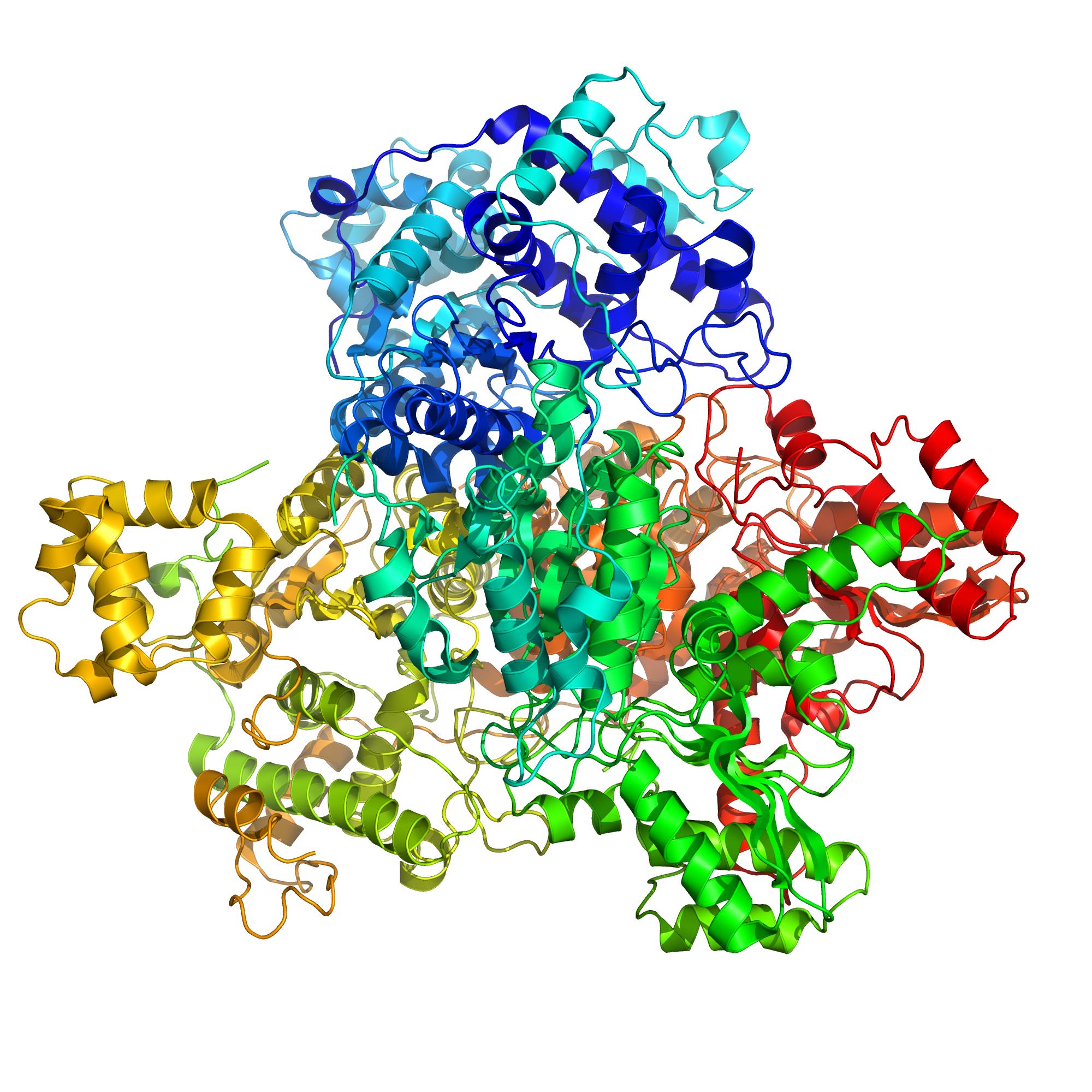
Pyruvate dehydrogenase E1 subunit of E. coli. Colors represent different chains.

== Active site ==
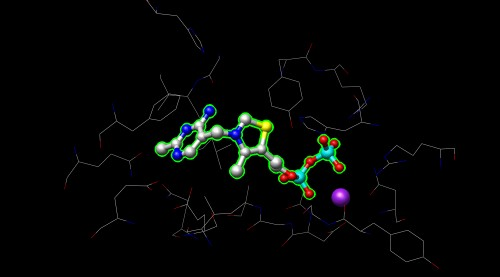

E1 has two catalytic sites, each providing thiamine pyrophosphate (TPP) and magnesium ion as cofactors. The α- subunit binds magnesium ion and pyrophosphate fragment while the β-subunit binds pyrimidine fragment of TPP, forming together a catalytic site at the interface of subunits.

The active site for pyruvate dehydrogenase (image created from PDB: 1NI4) holds TPP through metal ligation to a magnesium ion (purple sphere) and through hydrogen bonding to amino acids. While over 20 amino acids can be found in the active site, amino acids Tyr 89, Arg 90, Gly 136, Val 138, Asp 167, Gly 168, Ala 169, Asn, 196, and His 263 actually participate in hydrogen bonding to hold TPP and pyruvate (not shown here) in the active site. The amino acids are shown as wires, and the TPP is in ball and stick form. The active site also aids in the transfer of the acyl on the TPP to a lipoamide waiting on E2.

== Regulation ==
Phosphorylation of E1 by pyruvate dehydrogenase kinase (PDK) inactivates E1 and subsequently the entire complex. PDK is inhibited by dichloroacetic acid and pyruvate, resulting in a higher quantity of active, unphosphorylated PDH. Phosphorylation is reversed by pyruvate dehydrogenase phosphatase, which is stimulated by insulin, PEP, and AMP, but competitively inhibited by ATP, NADH, and Acetyl-CoA.

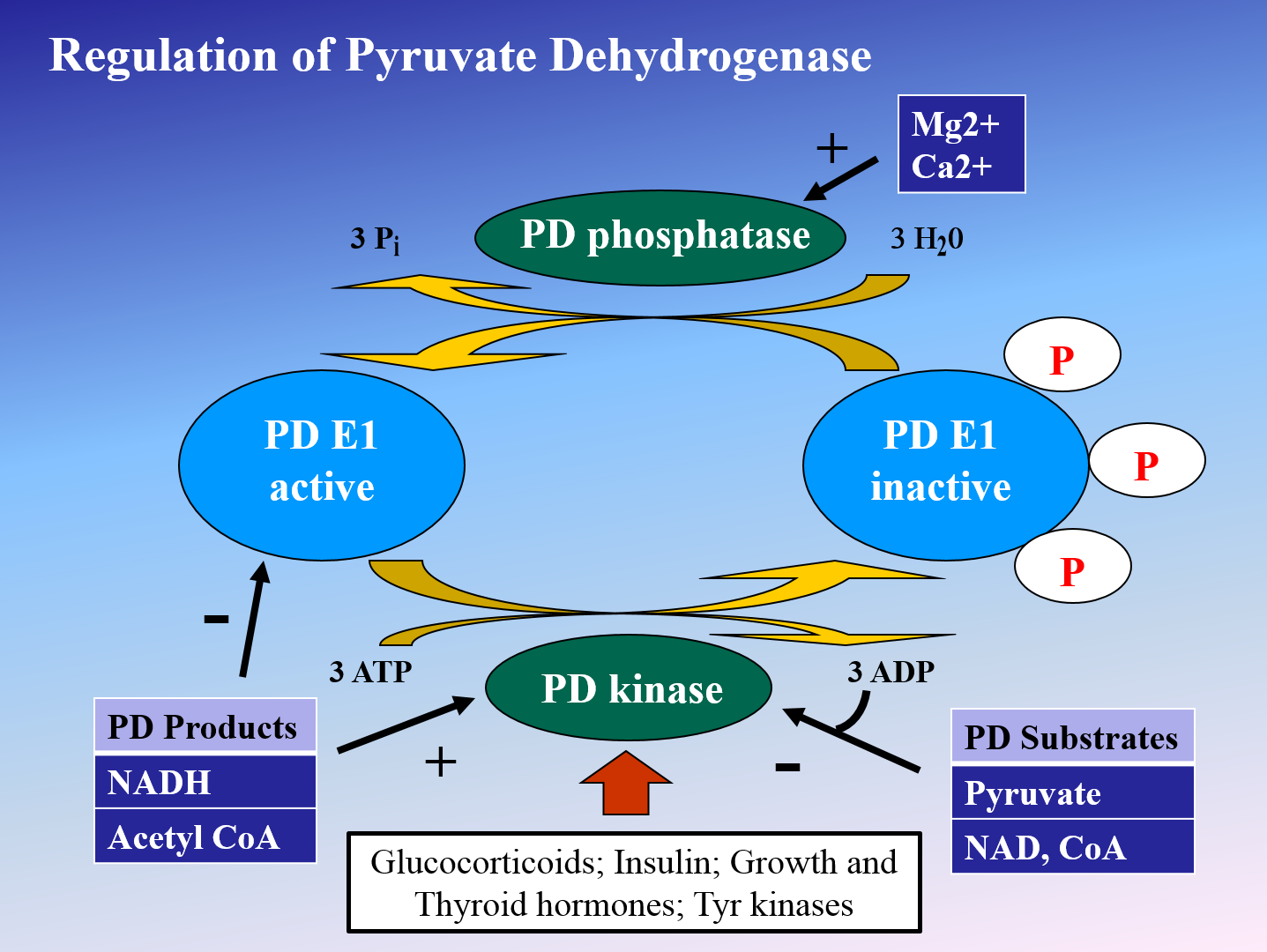

== Pathology ==
Pyruvate dehydrogenase is targeted by an autoantigen known as anti-mitochondrial antibodies (AMA), which results in progressive destruction of the small bile ducts of the liver, leading to primary biliary cirrhosis. These antibodies appear to recognize oxidized protein that has resulted from inflammatory immune responses. Some of these inflammatory responses could be related to gluten sensitivity as over 50% of the acute liver failure patients in one study exhibited a nonmitochondrial autoantibody against tissue transglutaminase. Other mitochondrial autoantigens include oxoglutarate dehydrogenase and branched-chain alpha-keto acid dehydrogenase complex, which are antigens recognized by anti-mitochondrial antibodies.

Increased pyruvate dehydrogenase (PDH) activity can cause oncogene-induced cellular senescence, as well as promoting aging. Decreased activity of mitochondrial PDH with age has been shown in the heart as well as in certain regions of the brain (the striatum and brainstem).

Pyruvate dehydrogenase (PDH) deficiency is a congenital degenerative metabolic disease resulting from a mutation of the pyruvate dehydrogenase complex (PDC) located on the X chromosome. While defects have been identified in all 3 enzymes of the complex, the E1-α subunit is predominantly the culprit. Malfunction of the citric acid cycle due to PDH deficiency deprives the body of energy and leads to an abnormal buildup of lactate. PDH deficiency is a common cause of lactic acidosis in newborns and often presents with severe lethargy, poor feeding, tachypnea, and cases of death have occurred.

== Examples ==
Human proteins that possess pyruvate dehydrogenase activity include:

Pyruvate dehydrogenase (lipoamide) alpha 1

Identifiers
- Symbol: PDHA1
- Alt. symbols: PDHA
- NCBI gene: 5160
- HGNC: 8806
- OMIM: 300502
- RefSeq: NM_000284
- UniProt: P08559

Other data
- EC number: 1.2.4.1
- Locus: Chr. X p22.1
Search for
- Structures: Swiss-model
- Domains: InterPro

pyruvate dehydrogenase (lipoamide) alpha 2

Identifiers
- Symbol: PDHA2
- Alt. symbols: PDHAL
- NCBI gene: 5161
- HGNC: 8807
- OMIM: 179061
- RefSeq: NM_005390
- UniProt: P29803

Other data
- EC number: 1.2.4.1
- Locus: Chr. 4 q22-q23
Search for
- Structures: Swiss-model
- Domains: InterPro

pyruvate dehydrogenase (lipoamide) beta

Identifiers
- Symbol: PDHB
- Alt. symbols: PHE1B
- NCBI gene: 5162
- HGNC: 8808
- OMIM: 179060
- RefSeq: NM_000925
- UniProt: P11177

Other data
- EC number: 1.2.4.1
- Locus: Chr. 3 p21.1-14.2
Search for
- Structures: Swiss-model
- Domains: InterPro

== Related enzymes ==
In bacteria, a form of pyruvate dehydrogenase (also called pyruvate oxidase, EC 1.2.2.2) exists that links the oxidation of pyruvate into acetate and carbon dioxide to the reduction of ferrocytochrome. In E. coli this enzyme is encoded by the pox B gene and the protein has a flavin cofactor. This enzyme increases the efficiency of growth of E. coli under aerobic conditions.

== See also ==
- Pyruvate dehydrogenase deficiency
