= Cofactor (biochemistry) =

Non-protein chemical compound or metallic ion

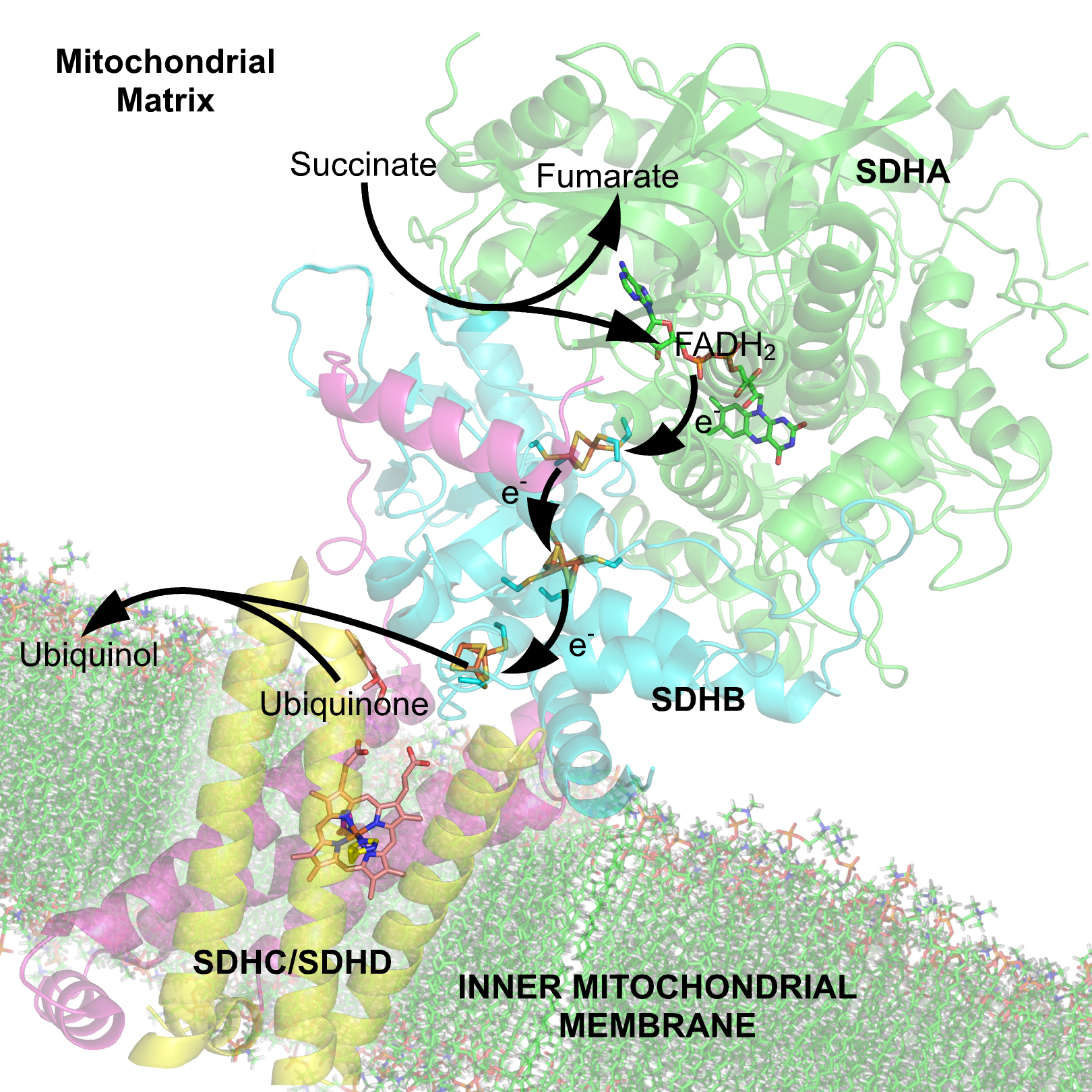
The succinate dehydrogenase complex showing several cofactors, including flavin, iron–sulfur centers, and heme.

A cofactor is a non-protein chemical compound or metallic ion that is required for an enzyme's role as a catalyst. Cofactors can be considered "helper molecules" that assist in biochemical transformations. The rates at which these happen are characterized in an area of study called enzyme kinetics. Cofactors typically differ from ligands in that they often derive their function by remaining bound.

Cofactors can be classified into two types: inorganic ions and complex organic molecules called coenzymes. Coenzymes are mainly derived from vitamins and other organic essential nutrients in small amounts (some definitions limit the use of the term "cofactor" for inorganic substances; both types are included here).

Coenzymes are further divided into two types. The first is called a "prosthetic group", which consists of a coenzyme that is tightly (or even covalently and, therefore, permanently) bound to a protein. The second type of coenzymes are called "cosubstrates", and are transiently bound to the protein. Cosubstrates may be released from a protein at some point, and then rebind later. Both prosthetic groups and cosubstrates have the same function, which is to facilitate the reaction of enzymes and proteins. An inactive enzyme without the cofactor is called an apoenzyme, while the complete enzyme with cofactor is called a holoenzyme.

The International Union of Pure and Applied Chemistry (IUPAC) defines "coenzyme" a little differently, namely as a low-molecular-weight, non-protein organic compound that is loosely attached, participating in enzymatic reactions as a dissociable carrier of chemical groups or electrons; a prosthetic group is defined as a tightly bound, nonpolypeptide unit in a protein that is regenerated in each enzymatic turnover.

Some enzymes or enzyme complexes require several cofactors. For example, the multienzyme complex pyruvate dehydrogenase at the junction of glycolysis and the citric acid cycle requires five organic cofactors and one metal ion: loosely bound thiamine pyrophosphate (TPP), covalently bound lipoamide and flavin adenine dinucleotide (FAD), cosubstrates nicotinamide adenine dinucleotide (NAD^{+}) and coenzyme A (CoA), and a metal ion (Mg^{2+}).

Organic cofactors are often vitamins or made from vitamins. Many contain the nucleotide adenosine monophosphate (AMP) as part of their structures, such as ATP, coenzyme A, FAD, and NAD^{+}. This common structure may reflect a common evolutionary origin as part of ribozymes in an ancient RNA world. It has been suggested that the AMP part of the molecule can be considered to be a kind of "handle" by which the enzyme can "grasp" the coenzyme to switch it between different catalytic centers.

== Classification ==
Cofactors can be divided into two major groups: organic cofactors, such as flavin or heme; and inorganic cofactors, such as the metal ions Mg^{2+}, Zn^{2+}, Cu^{+}, Mn^{2+} and iron–sulfur clusters.

Organic cofactors are sometimes further divided into coenzymes and prosthetic groups. The term coenzyme refers specifically to enzymes and, as such, to the functional properties of a protein. On the other hand, "prosthetic group" emphasizes the nature of the binding of a cofactor to a protein (tight or covalent) and, thus, refers to a structural property. Different sources give slightly different definitions of coenzymes, cofactors, and prosthetic groups. Some consider tightly bound organic molecules as prosthetic groups and not as coenzymes, while others define all non-protein organic molecules needed for enzyme activity as coenzymes, and classify those that are tightly bound as coenzyme prosthetic groups. These terms are often used loosely.

A 1980 letter in Trends in Biochemistry Sciences noted the confusion in the literature and the essentially arbitrary distinction made between prosthetic groups and coenzymes group and proposed the following scheme. Here, cofactors were defined as an additional substance apart from protein and substrate that is required for enzyme activity and a prosthetic group as a substance that undergoes its whole catalytic cycle attached to a single enzyme molecule. However, the author could not arrive at a single all-encompassing definition of a "coenzyme" and proposed that this term be dropped from use in the literature.

== Inorganic cofactors ==
=== Metal ions ===
Metal ions are common cofactors. The study of these cofactors falls under the area of bioinorganic chemistry. In nutrition, the list of essential trace elements reflects their role as cofactors. In humans this list commonly includes iron, magnesium, manganese, cobalt, copper, zinc, and molybdenum. Although chromium deficiency causes impaired glucose tolerance, no human enzyme that uses this metal as a cofactor has been identified. Iodine is also an essential trace element, but this element is used as part of the structure of thyroid hormones rather than as an enzyme cofactor. Calcium is another special case, in that it is required as a component of the human diet, and it is needed for the full activity of many enzymes, such as nitric oxide synthase, protein phosphatases, and adenylate kinase, but calcium activates these enzymes in allosteric regulation, often binding to these enzymes in a complex with calmodulin. Calcium is, therefore, a cell signaling ion, and not usually considered a cofactor of the enzymes it regulates.

Other organisms require additional metals as enzyme cofactors, such as vanadium in the nitrogenase of the nitrogen-fixing bacteria of the genus Azotobacter, tungsten in the aldehyde ferredoxin oxidoreductase of the thermophilic archaean Pyrococcus furiosus, and even cadmium in the carbonic anhydrase from the marine diatom Thalassiosira weissflogii.

In many cases, the cofactor includes both an inorganic and organic component. One diverse set of examples is the heme proteins, which consist of a porphyrin ring coordinated to iron.

Ion	Examples of enzymes containing this ion
Cupric	Cytochrome oxidase
Ferrous or Ferric	Catalase; Cytochrome (via Heme); Nitrogenase; Hydrogenase
Magnesium	Glucose 6-phosphatase Hexokinase; DNA polymerase
Manganese	Arginase
Molybdenum	Nitrate reductase Nitrogenase; Xanthine oxidase
Nickel	Urease
Zinc	Alcohol dehydrogenase Carbonic anhydrase DNA polymerase

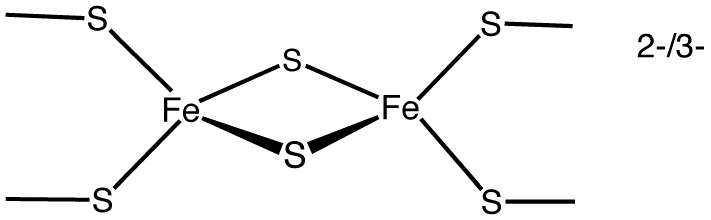
A simple [Fe_{2}S_{2}] cluster containing two iron atoms and two sulfur atoms, coordinated by four protein cysteine residues.

=== Iron–sulfur clusters ===
Iron–sulfur clusters are complexes of iron and sulfur atoms held within proteins by cysteinyl residues. They play both structural and functional roles, including electron transfer, redox sensing, and as structural modules.

== Organic ==
Organic cofactors are small organic molecules (typically a molecular mass less than 1000 Da) that can be either loosely or tightly bound to the enzyme and directly participate in the reaction. In the latter case, when it is difficult to remove without denaturing the enzyme, it can be called a prosthetic group. There is no sharp division between loosely and tightly bound cofactors. Many such as NAD^{+} can be tightly bound in some enzymes, while it is loosely bound in others. Another example is thiamine pyrophosphate (TPP), which is tightly bound in transketolase or pyruvate decarboxylase, while it is less tightly bound in pyruvate dehydrogenase. Other coenzymes, flavin adenine dinucleotide (FAD), biotin, and lipoamide, for instance, are tightly bound. Tightly bound cofactors are, in general, regenerated during the same reaction cycle, while loosely bound cofactors can be regenerated in a subsequent reaction catalyzed by a different enzyme. In the latter case, the cofactor can also be considered a substrate or cosubstrate.

Vitamins can serve as precursors to many organic cofactors (e.g., vitamins B_{1}, B_{2}, B_{6}, B_{12}, niacin, folic acid) or as coenzymes themselves (e.g., vitamin C). However, vitamins do have other functions in the body. Many organic cofactors also contain a nucleotide, such as the electron carriers NAD and FAD, and coenzyme A, which carries acyl groups. Most of these cofactors are found in a huge variety of species, and some are universal to all forms of life. An exception to this wide distribution is a group of unique cofactors that evolved in methanogens, which are restricted to this group of archaea.

Although enzyme catalyzed industrial processes are highly efficient, some of the enzymes are dependent on nicotinamide cofactors (NADH/NAD+, NADP/NAPH). Due to the high price of such cofactors, these processes would not be economically competitive. Recently, some synthetic organic compounds were identified as economically promising biomimetic counterparts of natural cofactors.

=== Vitamins and derivatives ===
Cofactor / Prosthetic group	Vitamin	Additional component	Chemical group(s) transferred	Distribution
Thiamine pyrophosphate	Thiamine (B_{1})	pyrophosphate	2-carbon groups, α cleavage	Bacteria, archaea and eukaryotes
NAD^{+} and NADP^{+}	Niacin (B_{3})	ADP	Electrons	Bacteria, archaea and eukaryotes
Pyridoxal phosphate	Pyridoxine (B_{6})	None	Amino and carboxyl groups	Bacteria, archaea and eukaryotes
Methylcobalamin	Vitamin B_{12}	Methyl group	acyl groups	Bacteria, archaea and eukaryotes
Cobalamine	Cobalamine (B_{12})	None	hydrogen, alkyl groups	Bacteria, archaea and eukaryotes
Biotin	Biotin (H)	None	CO_{2}	Bacteria, archaea and eukaryotes
Coenzyme A	Pantothenic acid (B_{5})	ADP	Acetyl group and other acyl groups	Bacteria, archaea and eukaryotes
Tetrahydrofolic acid	Folic acid (B_{9})	Glutamate residues	Methyl, formyl, methylene and formimino groups	Bacteria, archaea and eukaryotes
Menaquinone	Vitamin K	None	Carbonyl group and electrons	Bacteria, archaea and eukaryotes
Ascorbic acid	Vitamin C	None	Electrons	Bacteria, archaea and eukaryotes
Flavin mononucleotide	Riboflavin (B_{2})	None	Electrons	Bacteria, archaea and eukaryotes
Flavin adenine dinucleotide	Riboflavin (B_{2})	ADP	Electrons	Bacteria, archaea and eukaryotes
Coenzyme F420	Riboflavin (B_{2})	Amino acids	Electrons	Methanogens and some bacteria

=== Non-vitamins ===
Cofactor	Chemical group(s) transferred	Distribution
Adenosine triphosphate	Phosphate group	Bacteria, archaea and eukaryotes
S-Adenosyl methionine	Methyl group	Bacteria, archaea and eukaryotes
Coenzyme B	Electrons	Methanogens
Coenzyme M	Methyl group	Methanogens
Coenzyme Q	Electrons	Bacteria, archaea and eukaryotes
Cytidine triphosphate	Diacylglycerols and lipid head groups	Bacteria, archaea and eukaryotes
Glutathione	Electrons	Some bacteria and most eukaryotes
Heme	Electrons	Bacteria, archaea and eukaryotes
Lipoamide	Electrons, acyl groups	Bacteria, archaea and eukaryotes
Methanofuran	Formyl group	Methanogens
Molybdopterin	Oxygen atoms	Bacteria, archaea and eukaryotes
Nucleotide sugars	Monosaccharides	Bacteria, archaea and eukaryotes
3'-Phosphoadenosine-5'-phosphosulfate	Sulfate group	Bacteria, archaea and eukaryotes
Pyrroloquinoline quinone	Electrons	Bacteria
Tetrahydrobiopterin	Oxygen atom and electrons	Bacteria, archaea and eukaryotes
Tetrahydromethanopterin	Methyl group	Methanogens

=== Cofactors as metabolic intermediates ===
The redox reactions of nicotinamide adenine dinucleotide.

Metabolism involves a vast array of chemical reactions, but most fall under a few basic types of reactions that involve the transfer of functional groups. This common chemistry allows cells to use a small set of metabolic intermediates to carry chemical groups between different reactions. These group-transfer intermediates are the loosely bound organic cofactors, often called coenzymes.

Each class of group-transfer reaction is carried out by a particular cofactor, which is the substrate for a set of enzymes that produce it, and a set of enzymes that consume it. An example of this are the dehydrogenases that use nicotinamide adenine dinucleotide (NAD^{+}) as a cofactor. Here, hundreds of separate types of enzymes remove electrons from their substrates and reduce NAD^{+} to NADH. This reduced cofactor is then a substrate for any of the reductases in the cell that require electrons to reduce their substrates.

Therefore, these cofactors are continuously recycled as part of metabolism. As an example, the total quantity of ATP in the human body is about 0.1 mole. This ATP is constantly being broken down into ADP, and then converted back into ATP. Thus, at any given time, the total amount of ATP + ADP remains fairly constant. The energy used by human cells requires the hydrolysis of 100 to 150 moles of ATP daily, which is around 50 to 75 kg. In typical situations, humans use up their body weight of ATP over the course of the day. This means that each ATP molecule is recycled 1000 to 1500 times daily.

=== Evolution ===
Organic cofactors, such as ATP and NADH, are present in all known forms of life and form a core part of metabolism. Such universal conservation indicates that these molecules evolved very early in the development of living things. At least some of the current set of cofactors may, therefore, have been present in the last universal ancestor, which lived about 4 billion years ago.

Organic cofactors may have been present even earlier in the history of life on Earth. The nucleotide adenosine is a cofactor for many basic metabolic enzymes such as transferases. It may be a remnant of the RNA world. Adenosine-based cofactors may have acted as adaptors that allowed enzymes and ribozymes to bind new cofactors through small modifications in existing adenosine-binding domains, which had originally evolved to bind a different cofactor. This process of adapting a pre-evolved structure for a novel use is known as exaptation.

Prebiotic origin of coenzymes. Like amino acids and nucleotides, certain vitamins and thus coenzymes can be created under early earth conditions. For instance, vitamin B3 can be synthesized with electric discharges applied to ethylene and ammonia. Similarly, pantetheine (a vitamin B5 derivative), a precursor of coenzyme A and thioester-dependent synthesis, can be formed spontaneously under evaporative conditions. Other coenzymes may have existed early on Earth, such as pterins (a derivative of vitamin B9), flavins (FAD, flavin mononucleotide = FMN), and riboflavin (vitamin B2).

Changes in coenzymes. A computational method, IPRO, recently predicted mutations that experimentally switched the cofactor specificity of Candida boidinii xylose reductase from NADPH to NADH.

Evolution of enzymes without coenzymes. If enzymes require a co-enzyme, how does the coenzyme evolve? The most likely scenario is that enzymes can function initially without their coenzymes and later recruit the coenzyme, even if the catalyzed reaction may not be as efficient or as fast. Examples are Alcohol Dehydrogenase (coenzyme: NAD⁺), Lactate Dehydrogenase (NAD⁺), Glutathione Reductase (NADPH).

=== History ===
The first organic cofactor to be discovered was NAD^{+}, which was identified by Arthur Harden and William Young 1906. They noticed that adding boiled and filtered yeast extract greatly accelerated alcoholic fermentation in unboiled yeast extracts. They called the unidentified factor responsible for this effect a coferment. Through a long and difficult purification from yeast extracts, this heat-stable factor was identified as a nucleotide sugar phosphate by Hans von Euler-Chelpin. Other cofactors were identified throughout the early 20th century, with ATP being isolated in 1929 by Karl Lohmann, and coenzyme A being discovered in 1945 by Fritz Albert Lipmann.

The functions of these molecules were at first mysterious, but, in 1936, Otto Heinrich Warburg identified the function of NAD^{+} in hydride transfer. This discovery was followed in the early 1940s by the work of Herman Kalckar, who established the link between the oxidation of sugars and the generation of ATP. This confirmed the central role of ATP in energy transfer that had been proposed by Fritz Albert Lipmann in 1941. Later, in 1949, Morris Friedkin and Albert L. Lehninger proved that NAD^{+} linked metabolic pathways such as the citric acid cycle and the synthesis of ATP.

== Protein-derived cofactors ==
In a number of enzymes, the moiety that acts as a cofactor is formed by post-translational modification of a part of the protein sequence. This often replaces the need for an external binding factor, such as a metal ion, for protein function. Potential modifications could be oxidation of aromatic residues, binding between residues, cleavage or ring-forming. These alterations are distinct from other post-translation protein modifications, such as phosphorylation, methylation, or glycosylation in that the amino acids typically acquire new functions. This increases the functionality of the protein; unmodified amino acids are typically limited to acid-base reactions, and the alteration of resides can give the protein electrophilic sites or the ability to stabilize free radicals. Examples of cofactor production include tryptophan tryptophylquinone (TTQ), derived from two tryptophan side chains, and 4-methylidene-imidazole-5-one (MIO), derived from an Ala-Ser-Gly motif. Characterization of protein-derived cofactors is conducted using X-ray crystallography and mass spectroscopy; structural data is necessary because sequencing does not readily identify the altered sites.

== Non-enzymatic cofactors ==
The term is used in other areas of biology to refer more broadly to non-protein (or even protein) molecules that either activate, inhibit, or are required for the protein to function. For example, ligands such as hormones that bind to and activate receptor proteins are termed cofactors or coactivators, whereas molecules that inhibit receptor proteins are termed corepressors. One such example is the G protein-coupled receptor family of receptors, which are frequently found in sensory neurons. Ligand binding to the receptors activates the G protein, which then activates an enzyme to activate the effector. In order to avoid confusion, it has been suggested that such proteins that have ligand-binding mediated activation or repression be referred to as coregulators.

== See also ==
- Enzyme catalysis
- Inorganic chemistry
- Organometallic chemistry
- Bioorganometallic chemistry
- Cofactor engineering
- Vitamin
