= Lipoamide =

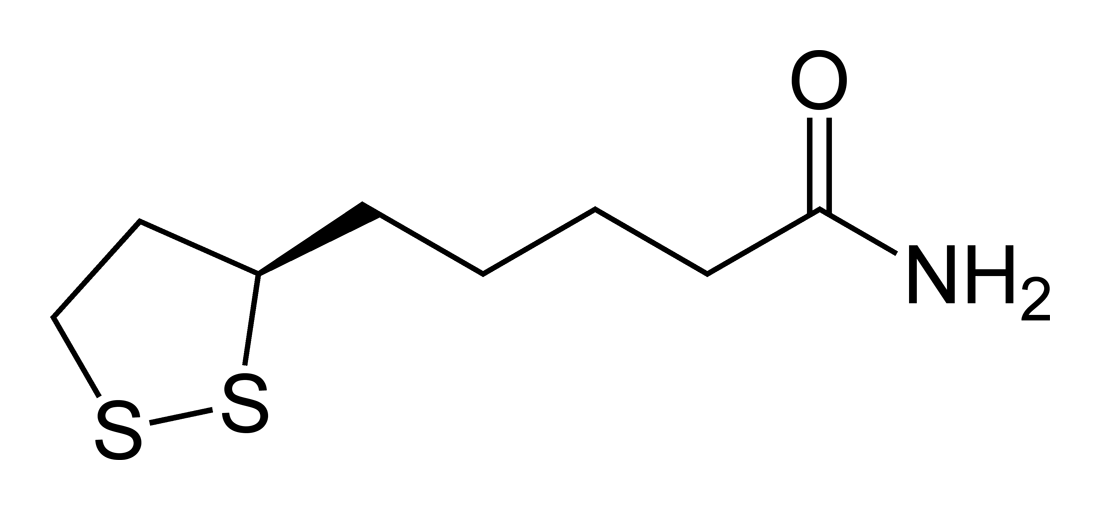
- Skeletal formula

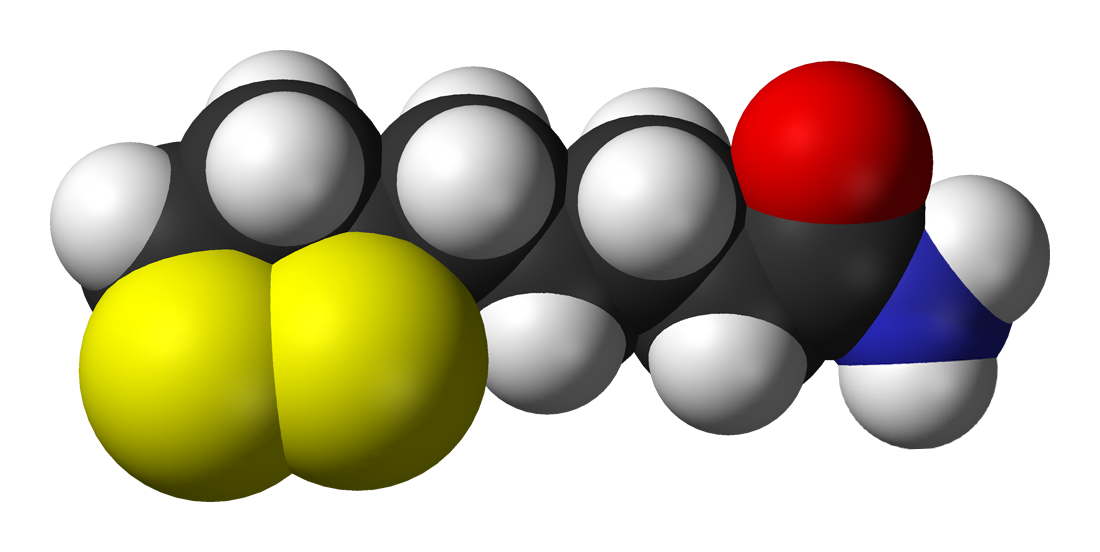
- Space-filling model

Names
- IUPAC name 5-(1,2-Dithiolan-3-yl)pentanamide
- Other names Thioctic acid amide

Identifiers
CAS Number	940-69-2
3D model (JSmol)	Interactive image
ChEBI	CHEBI:17460
ChemSpider	5360246
KEGG	C00248
MeSH	lipoamide
PubChem CID	6992093
UNII	Q1GT04827L
- InChI: InChI=1S/C8H15NOS2/c9-8(10)4-2-1-3-7-5-6-11-12-7/h7H,1-6H2,(H2,9,10)/t7-/m1/s1 Key: FCCDDURTIIUXBY-SSDOTTSWSA-N; InChI=1/C8H15NOS2/c9-8(10)4-2-1-3-7-5-6-11-12-7/h7H,1-6H2,(H2,9,10)/t7-/m1/s1 Key: FCCDDURTIIUXBY-SSDOTTSWBG
- SMILES: O=C(N)CCCC[C@H]1SSCC1

Properties
Chemical formula	C_{8}H_{15}NOS_{2}
Molar mass	205.343 g/mol
- Except where otherwise noted, data are given for materials in their standard state (at 25 °C [77 °F], 100 kPa). verify (what is ?) Infobox references

Lipoamide is a trivial name for 6,8-dithiooctanoic amide. It is the functional form of lipoic acid, i.e the carboxyl group is attached to protein via an amine with an amide linkage. Illustrative of the biochemical role of lipoamide is in the conversion of pyruvate to acetyl lipoamide.

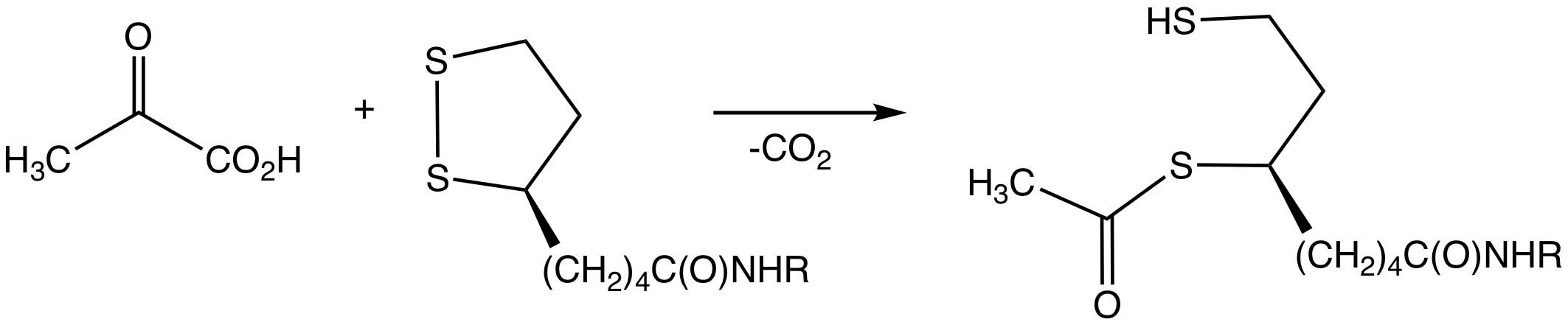

Lipoamide is found in a large number of plant and animal-based foods.

== See also ==
- Lipoic acid
