= Eli Lilly Award in Biological Chemistry =

Scientific award given by the American Chemical Society

The Eli Lilly Award in Biological Chemistry was established in 1934. Consisting of a bronze medal and honorarium, its purpose is to stimulate fundamental research in biological chemistry by scientists not over thirty-eight years of age. The Award is administered by the Division of Biological Chemistry of the American Chemical Society.

== Recipients ==
Past recipients of the Lilly Award:

- 1935 – Willard Myron Allen
- 1937 – Harold S. Olcott
- 1938 – Abraham White
- 1939 – George Wald
- 1940 – Eric G. Ball
- 1941 – David Rittenberg
- 1942 – Earl A. Evans, Jr.
- 1943 – Herbert E. Carter
- 1944 – Joseph S. Fruton
- 1945 – Max A. Lauffer
- 1946 – John D. Ferry
- 1947 – Sidney Colowick
- 1948 – Dilworth Wayne Woolley
- 1949 – Irving Myron Klotz
- 1950 – William Shive
- 1951 – John M. Buchanan
- 1952 – David M. Bonner
- 1953 – Nathan O. Kaplan
- 1954 – Harvey A. Itano
- 1955 – William F. Neuman
- 1956 – Robert A. Alberty
- 1957 – Harold A. Scheraga
- 1958 – Lester J. Reed
- 1959 – Paul Berg
- 1960 – James D. Watson
- 1961 – Frederick Crane
- 1962 – Jerard Hurwitz
- 1963 – William P. Jencks
- 1964 – Bruce N. Ames
- 1965 – Gerald M. Edelman
- 1966 – Phillips W. Robbins
- 1967 – Gordon G. Hammes
- 1968 – Charles C. Richardson
- 1969 – Mario R. Capecchi
- 1970 – Lubert Stryer
- 1971 – David F. Wilson
- 1972 – Bruce M. Alberts
- 1973 – C. Fred Fox
- 1974 – James Dahlberg
- 1975 – Mark Ptashne
- 1976 – Joan A. Steitz
- 1977 – Robert G. Roeder
- 1978 – Charles R. Cantor
- 1979 – Christopher T. Walsh
- 1980 – Phillip A. Sharp
- 1981 – Roger D. Kornberg
- 1982 – Harold M. Weintraub
- 1983 – Richard Axel
- 1984 – David V. Goeddel
- 1985 – Gerald M. Rubin
- 1986 – James E. Rothman
- 1987 – Jacqueline K. Barton
- 1988 – Peter Walter
- 1989 – Michael M. Cox
- 1990 – George L. McLendon
- 1991 – Peter G. Schultz
- 1992 – William DeGrado
- 1993 – Stuart L. Schreiber
- 1994 – Peter S. Kim
- 1995 – Jeremy Berg
- 1996 – Gregory L. Verdine
- 1997 – Alanna Schepartz
- 1998 – John Kuriyan
- 1999 – Chaitan Khosla
- 2000 – Xiaodong Wang
- 2001 – Jennifer Doudna
- 2002 – Kevan M. Shokat
- 2003 – Andreas Matouschek
- 2004 – Benjamin Cravatt III
- 2005 – Dewey G. McCafferty
- 2006 – Linda Hsieh-Wilson
- 2007 – Anna K. Mapp
- 2008 – Paul J. Hergenrother
- 2009 – Scott K. Silverman
- 2010 – Alice Y. Ting
- 2011 – Nathanael Gray
- 2012 – Christopher J. Chang
- 2013 – Matthew D. Disney
- 2014 – Yi Tang
- 2015 – Minkui Luo
- 2016 – Elizabeth Nolan
- 2017 – Howard C. Hang
- 2018 – Bradley L. Pentelute
- 2019 – Neal Devaraj
- 2020 – Yimon Aye
- 2021 – Jordan L. Meier
- 2022 – Lingyin Li
- 2023 – Polly Fordyce
- 2024 – Joseph Cotruvo, Jr.
- 2025 – Brian Liau
- 2026 – Alexis Komor

== See also ==
- List of biochemistry awards
