= Irving Myron Klotz =

American chemist

- Born: 22 January 1916; Chicago, Illinois, US
- Died: 27 April 2005 (aged 89); Evanston, Illinois
- Education: University of Chicago
- Awards: Eli Lilly Award in Biological Chemistry (1949)
- Scientific career
- Workplaces: Northwestern University

Irving Myron Klotz (22 January 1916 - 27 April 2005) was an American chemist, academic and researcher who won several awards in the field of biochemistry.

== Early life ==
He was born on January 22, 1916 in Chicago, Illinois. His parents were Frank and Mollie Klotz, Jewish immigrants from Eastern Europe.

He attended the Marshall High School, a Chicago public school and graduated in 1933. He graduated from the University of Chicago, where he earned his B.S. in 1937 and a Ph.D. three years later. His Ph.D. adviser in chemistry at the University of Chicago was Gilbert N. Lewis.

In 1947, he married Themis Askounis Klotz, with whom he had two children, son Edward and daughter Audie. He married a second time in 1966 to Mary Sue Hanlon Klotz and had a son David.

He retired in 1986 and died on April 27, 2005 in Evanston, Illinois.

== Career ==
He joined the faculty of Northwestern University in 1940 and became a full professor in 1950. He was appointed Charles E. and Emma H. Morrison Professor of Chemistry in 1962.

He consulted for companies including Abbott Research Laboratories and the Toni Company.

== Recognition ==
His work was repeatedly recognized by his peers:

- Eli Lilly Award in Biological Chemistry (1949)
- William C. Rose Award (1993)
- Fellow of the American Academy of Arts and Sciences
- Fellow of the American Association for the Advancement of Science

== Bibliography ==
Among his notable works are:

- Chemical Thermodynamics: Basic Theory and Methods (1950; sixth edition, 2000)
- Energy Changes in Biochemical Reactions (1967)
- Ligand-Receptor Energetics: A Guide for the Perplexed (1997)

== See also ==
- Dilworth Wayne Woolley
- Sidney Colowick
