= John Buchanan (biologist) =

American professor of biochemistry

- Born: John Machlin Buchanan; September 29, 1917; Winamac, Indiana, U.S.
- Died: June 25, 2007 (aged 89); Burlington, Massachusetts, U.S.
- Education: DePauw University (BS); University of Michigan, Ann Arbor (MS); Harvard University (PhD)
- Known for: Study of purine biosynthesis
- Awards: Eli Lilly Award in Biological Chemistry
- Scientific career
- Fields: Biochemistry
- Institutions: Massachusetts Institute of Technology
- Doctoral advisor: Albert Baird Hastings
- Doctoral students: Chen Lan-bo

John Machlin Buchanan (September 29, 1917 – June 25, 2007) was an American professor of biochemistry at the Massachusetts Institute of Technology. He arrived at MIT in 1953 and retired in 1988 after a distinguished career in which he was elected a fellow of the American Academy of Arts and Sciences and the National Academy of Sciences. He played a key role in the development of MIT's Department of Biology as a major force in biochemistry research and was himself a prominent researcher of purine biosynthesis. He died in 2007 at age 89.

== Early life and education ==
Buchanan was born in Winamac, Indiana, in 1917. He became interested in a career in science during a high school chemistry course. He attended DePauw University as an undergraduate, where he gained his first scientific research experience, and from which he graduated with a bachelor's degree in chemistry in 1938. He received his M.S. from the University of Michigan, Ann Arbor in 1939, and later identified the head of its chemistry department, Howard B. Lewis, as a key influence in his research career. Buchanan received his Ph.D. from Harvard University in 1943 under the supervision of Albert Baird Hastings.

== Academic career ==
Buchanan arrived at MIT in 1953 after reaching the rank of full professor at the University of Pennsylvania Medical School. He had been heavily recruited by the head of what was then called the Department of Molecular Biology, Francis O. Schmitt. He became the head of the Division of Biochemistry and quickly began recruiting faculty interested in biochemistry research, including Gene Brown, Vernon Ingram, Salvador Luria, Paul Schimmel, Phil Robbins and Lisa Steiner (the first woman faculty member in the department, hired in 1967). He also sought out more senior scientists to bring to MIT, including Cyrus Levinthal, Maurice Fox and Alexander Rich. James Killian, the MIT president responsible for recruiting Buchanan, described the hire as among the most important and expensive hires he made, because the department's biochemistry division under Buchanan's leadership quickly became widely well-regarded in the field. Later, as biochemistry became more established, Buchanan opposed some of the decisions made in the department, such as the shutdown of the Division of Biochemistry under department head Boris Magasanik and the planning under subsequent department head Gene Brown to launch the Whitehead Institute.

Buchanan was awarded the Eli Lilly Award in Biological Chemistry in 1951. He was elected to the American Academy of Arts and Sciences in 1953 and to the United States National Academy of Sciences in 1962. Buchanan became the first John and Dorothy Wilson Professor in 1966 and retained the title till he retired in 1988. In 2006, MIT endowed an annual lectureship in his name.

== Research ==
Buchanan's graduate research formed one of the earliest uses of radiolabeling for studying metabolism. He is best known for his research on the biosynthesis of purines. Often working in parallel with G. Robert Greenberg, Buchanan's research group made so much progress on this topic that they laid out their findings in a series of over 20 papers published in the Journal of Biological Chemistry. Buchanan and Greenberg's work together provided an understanding of the pathway through which purine bases could be converted to nucleotides.

== Personal life ==
Buchanan met his wife Elsa during a visit to Stockholm to work with Hugo Theorell. The two were married for 57 years and had four children. Buchanan died in 2007 at age 89.
