= Paul J. Hergenrother =

American chemistry professor

Paul J. Hergenrother is an American chemist and the Kenneth L. Rinehart Jr. Endowed Chair in Natural Products chemistry at the University of Illinois Urbana-Champaign. His research focuses on the development of organic small molecules with novel biological properties such as enzyme inhibitors and activators, chemotherapeutics, and antibacterial agents. In 2008 Hergenrother was awarded the Eli Lilly Award in Biological Chemistry.

== Education ==
Hergenrother attended college at University of Notre Dame. In 1999, Hergenrother earned his PhD in chemistry from the University of Texas, where he worked in the lab of Professor Stephen F. Martin.

== Career and research ==
From 1999 to 2001, Hergenrother completed an American Cancer Society postdoctoral fellowship at Harvard University in the lab of Professor Stuart Schreiber. In 2001, Hergenrother became a faculty member in the department of chemistry at the University of Illinois Urbana-Champaign. In the spring of 2020, he led the team at the University of Illinois that developed a saliva test for SARS-CoV-2, a test that was widely used throughout the covid-19 pandemic. Several notable biologically active compounds have been discovered in his laboratory, including the anticancer drugs PAC-1, deoxynyboquinone, everafenib, and ErSO; the novel antibiotics lolamicin and fabimycin; and raptinal, a widely used tool in apoptotic research.

== Notable papers ==
Web of Science lists 215 publications authored by Hergenrother in peer-reviewed scientific journals that have been cited over 8000 times. His three most cited research articles have been cited >200 times each.

=== Awards and honors ===
- 2002 - National Science Foundation Career Award
- 2003 - Research Corporation Research Innovation Award
- 2003 - Beckman Young Investigator Award
- 2005 - Sloan Research Fellow
- 2006 - GlaxoSmithKline Chemistry Scholar Award
- 2006 - ACS David Robertson Award for Excellence in Medicinal Chemistry
- 2006 - Camille Dreyfus Teacher-Scholar Award
- 2006 - American Cancer Society Research Scholar
- 2008 - Eli Lilly Award in Biological Chemistry
- 2016 - Ehrlich Award for Excellence in Medicinal Chemistry
- 2023 - National Cancer Institute Outstanding Investigator
