= Howard Lewis =

Howard Lewis may refer to:

- Howard B. Lewis (1887–1954), chemistry professor
- Howard Lew Lewis (1941–2018), English comedian and actor
