= C24H20N4O =

The molecular formula C_{24}H_{20}N_{4}O may refer to:

- Lolamicin
- Sudan IV
