= Minkui Luo =

- Education: Fudan University; Princeton University
- Known for: enzymology & inhibition of methyltransferases
- Awards: Eli Lilly Award in Biological Chemistry; NIH Director's New Innovator Award
- Scientific career
- Fields: Chemical biology Biochemistry
- Workplaces: Albert Einstein College of Medicine; Memorial Sloan Kettering Cancer Center
- Doctoral advisor: John T. Groves
- Other academic advisors: Vern Schramm

Minkui Luo is a biochemist and professor of biochemistry at Memorial Sloan Kettering Cancer Center. His research interests include chemical biology and the study of posttranslational modifications in epigenetic signaling, with an emphasis on protein methyltransferases.

== Education ==
Luo attended college at Fudan University and earned his PhD in Bioorganic and Bioinorganic Chemistry in 2005 from Princeton University, where he worked in the lab of Professor John T. Groves.

== Career and research ==
From 2005 to 2008, Luo pursued postdoctoral studies at the Albert Einstein College of Medicine in the lab of Professor Vern Schramm. In 2008, Luo became a faculty member in the department of Molecular Pharmacology and Chemistry at Memorial Sloan Kettering Cancer Center. His group has pioneered the use of chemical genetic 'bump-hole' methodologies to identify the substrates of protein methyltransferases, an approach that requires engineering these enzymes to use a non-natural S-adenosyl methionine analogue as a cofactor. Luo's lab also has contributed to the development of new chemical probes of protein methyltransferases, enabling their function to be probed in vitro and in cells.

== Notable papers ==
Web of Science lists 77 publications authored by Luo in peer-reviewed scientific journals that have been cited over 2000 times, leading to an h-index of 23. His lab's five most cited papers (>80 each) are:

1. Luo, Minkui (2012). "Current Chemical Biology Approaches to Interrogate Protein Methyltransferases". ACS Chemical Biology. 7 (3): 443–463. doi:10.1021/cb200519y. PMC 3306480. PMID 22220966.
2. Zheng, Weihong; Ibanez, Glorymar; Wu, Hong; Blum, Gil; Luo, Minkui; et al. (2012). "Sinefungin derivatives as inhibitors and structure probes of protein lysine methyltransferase SETD2". Journal of the American Chemical Society. 134 (43): 18004–18014. doi:10.1021/ja307060p. PMC 3504124. PMID 23043551.
3. Luo, Minkui (2018). "Chemical and Biochemical Perspectives of Protein Lysine Methylation". Chemical Reviews. 118 (34): 6656–6705. doi:10.1021/acs.chemrev.8b00008. PMC 6668730. PMID 29927582.
4. Wang, Rui; Zheng, Weihong; Yu, Haiqiang; Deng, Haiteng; Luo, Minkui (2011). "Labeling substrates of protein arginine methyltransferase with engineered enzymes and matched S-adenosyl-L-methionine analogues". Journal of the American Chemical Society. 133 (20): 7648–7651. doi:10.1021/ja2006719. PMC 3104021. PMID 21539310.
5. Wang, Rui; Islam, Kabirul; Liu, Ying; Zheng, Weihong; Luo, Minkui; et al. (2013). "Profiling genome-wide chromatin methylation with engineered posttranslation apparatus within living cells". Journal of the American Chemical Society. 135 (3): 1048–1056. doi:10.1021/ja309412s. PMC 3582175. PMID 23244065.

== Awards and honors ==
- 2009 - The V Scholar Award, the V Foundation for Cancer Research
- 2010 - NIH Director's New Innovator Award (DP2)
- 2011 - Basil O'Connor Starter Scholar, March of Dimes Birth Defects Foundation
- 2014 - Clinical & Translational Science Center Novel Award, Weill Cornell Medical College
- 2015 - Eli Lilly Award in Biological Chemistry
