= Neal Devaraj =

American chemist

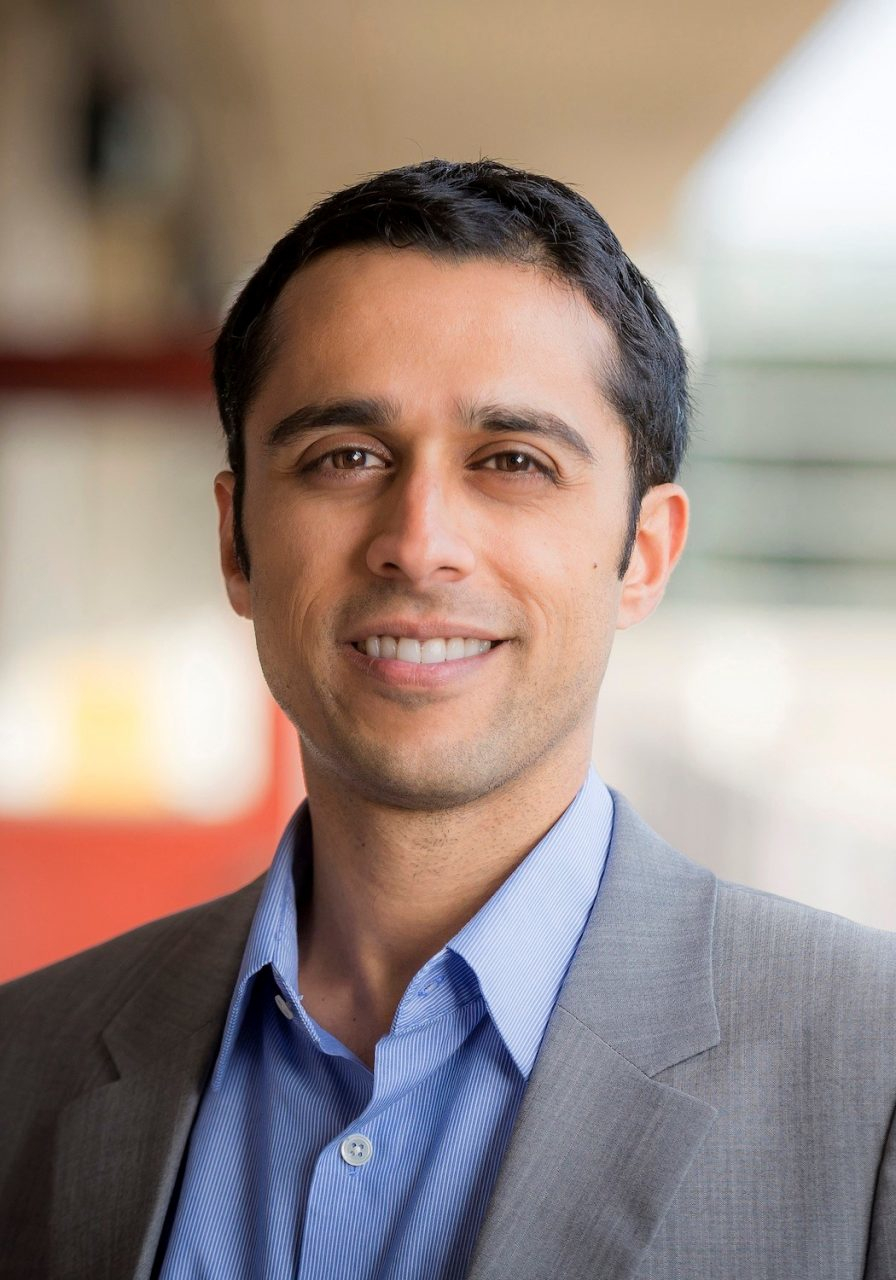
- Devaraj in 2018
- Born: September 7, 1980 (age 45); Manhattan Beach, California, U.S.
- Education: MIT; Stanford
- Known for: Tetrazine bioorthogonal reactions; synthesis of artificial cells and membranes
- Awards: Guggenheim Fellowship (2019); Eli Lilly Award in Biological Chemistry (2019); ACS Award in Pure Chemistry (2017); NSF CAREER Award (2013)
- Scientific career
- Fields: Chemical biology Biochemistry
- Workplaces: Harvard; University of California, San Diego
- Doctoral advisor: James P. Collman; Christopher Chidsey
- Other academic advisors: Moungi Bawendi; Ralph Weissleder

Neal K. Devaraj (born September 7, 1980) is an American chemist and professor at the University of California, San Diego (UCSD). His research interests include artificial cells, lipid membranes, and bioconjugation.

== Education ==
Devaraj attended college at the Massachusetts Institute of Technology, where he performed research in the lab of Professor Moungi Bawendi. In 2007, Devaraj earned his PhD in chemistry from Stanford University, where he worked in the labs of Professors James P. Collman and Christopher Chidsey.

== Career and research ==
From 2007-2011, Deveraj completed a postdoctoral fellowship at the Harvard Medical School in the lab of Professor Ralph Weissleder. In 2011, Devaraj became a faculty member in the department of Chemistry and Biochemistry at UCSD, where he is currently the Murray Goodman Endowed Chair in Chemistry and Biochemistry.

=== Selected publications ===
- Devaraj, NK (2018). "The Future of Bioorthogonal Chemistry". ACS Central Science. 4 (8): 952–9. doi:10.1021/acscentsci.8b00251. PMC 6107859. PMID 30159392.
- Wu, H; Alexander, SC; Jin, S; Devaraj, NK (2016). "A Bioorthogonal Near-Infrared Fluorogenic Probe for mRNA Detection". Journal of the American Chemical Society. 138 (36): 11429–32. doi:10.1021/jacs.6b01625. PMID 27510580.
- Wu, H; Yang, J; Šečkutė, J; Devaraj, NK (2014). "In situ synthesis of alkenyl tetrazines for highly fluorogenic bioorthogonal live-cell imaging probes". Angewandte Chemie International Edition in English. 53 (23): 5805–9. doi:10.1002/anie.201400135. PMC 4104127. PMID 24764312.
- Yang, J; Devaraj, NK (2012). "Live-Cell Imaging of Cyclopropene Tags with Fluorogenic Tetrazine Cycloadditions". Angewandte Chemie International Edition in English. 51 (30): 7476–9. doi:10.1002/ange.201202122. PMC 3431913. PMID 22696426.
- Yang, J; Karver, MR; Li, W; Sahu, S; Devaraj, NK (2012). "Metal-catalyzed one-pot synthesis of tetrazines directly from aliphatic nitriles and hydrazine". Angewandte Chemie International Edition in English. 51 (21): 5222–5. doi:10.1002/anie.201201117. PMC 3434974. PMID 22511586.

=== Awards and honors ===
- 2013 - NSF CAREER Award
- 2016 - NIH T1D Pathfinder Award
- 2016 - Camille Dreyfus Teacher-Scholar Award
- 2016 - National Fresenius Award
- 2017 - ACS Award in Pure Chemistry
- 2018 - Magomedov-Shcherbinina Memorial Prize
- 2018 - Blavatnik National Laureate in Chemistry
- 2019 - Eli Lilly Award in Biological Chemistry
- 2019 - Guggenheim Fellowship
- 2019 - Leo Hendrik Baekeland Award
- 2021 - Tetrahedron Young Investigator Award
- 2022 - Bioconjugate Chemistry Lectureship Award
- 2022 - Vannevar Bush Faculty Fellowship
