= Abraham White =

American biochemist

- Born: March 8, 1908; Cleveland, Ohio
- Died: February 18, 1980 (aged 71); Santa Barbara, Cal.
- Education: University of Colorado (B.S. and M.S), University of Michigan (Ph.D.)
- Known for: Proving that animals can convert methionine into cysteine Isolation of prolactin and ATCH; Principles of Biochemistry
- Spouse: Edna
- Parents: Morris White (father); Lena (mother)
- Awards: Eli Lilly Prize in Biochemistry (1938); Distinguished Alumni Award, University of Denver (1960); Sesquicentennial Alumni Award, University of Michigan (1967); Borden Award, Association of American Medical Colleges (1969)
- Scientific career
- Fields: Biochemistry
- Institutions: Yale School of Medicine; University of California School of Medicine in Los Angeles; Albert Einstein College of Medicine; Stanford University School of Medicine; Syntex Laboratories
- Doctoral advisor: Howard B. Lewis

Abraham White (March 8, 1908 – February 14, 1980) was a professor of biochemistry who made several important discoveries in his field during the middle of the 20th century and helped write a foundational textbook, Principles of Biochemistry, which was published in 1954. The book went through six editions before its authors retired.

== Early life and education ==
White was born in Cleveland, Ohio, to Morris and Lena White. His siblings were Essie and Julius ("Jay"). When he was about one year old, his family moved to Lafayette, Colorado, and then later to Denver. White earned his bachelor's and master's degrees at the University of Colorado and a Ph.D. degree in Physiological Chemistry at the University of Michigan in the laboratory of Howard B. Lewis. This was followed by a postdoctoral fellowship at the Yale School of Medicine with Hubert Bradford Vickery at the Connecticut Agricultural Experiment Station.

== Research and career ==
After completing his fellowship, White joined the faculty in the Department of Physiological Chemistry at Yale, where he initially studied the amino acid composition of proteins and metabolism of sulfur-containing amino acids. White's research gradually moved to nutritional and growth studies in animals and investigations of the protein hormones of the pituitary gland, especially involving proteins containing sulfur. Working with E.F. Beach, White proved that the amino acid methionine could be metabolized to cysteine by showing that rats could grow on a diet containing proteins that were devoid of cysteine, as long as they contained methionine. In 1937 White reported the isolation of bovine prolactin, the first of the pituitary hormones to be obtained in pure form, and in 1943 the isolation of porcine adrenocorticotropic hormone. These discoveries opened the field of biochemistry to the study of pituitary hormones and the experimental finding that administration of adrenocorticotropic hormone caused involution of lymphoid tissues. This ultimately led to the use of steroids with adrenocortical activity in the treatment of patients with certain lymphomas and chronic lymphatic leukemia, and to the use of steroids in the treatment of patients prior to organ or tissue transplantation to depress the immunity of the transplant recipients, and thus lower the chances of rejection of the transplanted organ.

White eventually became acting chairman of the Department of Physiological Chemistry at Yale. In 1951 he became professor and chairman of the Department of Physiological Chemistry at the University of California School of Medicine in Los Angeles. In 1953 he moved back east to become the first faculty member, professor, the inaugural chairman of the Department of Biochemistry, and an associate dean at the newly founded Albert Einstein College of Medicine in the Bronx, New York.

In 1954, White, along with Philip Handler and Emil L. Smith, published a landmark textbook, Principles of Biochemistry. Until that time, there was no standard textbook in the field. It was used extensively at the undergraduate and graduate level and went through six editions, the last being published in 1978. White retired from his appointment at Einstein in 1972 to become a consultant to Syntex Laboratories and the Stanford University School of Medicine.

== Personal life ==
White was married to his wife Edna for more than 40 years. He died unexpectedly on February 14, 1980, in Santa Barbara, California, where he had gone that day from his home in Palo Alto to deliver a lecture at the University of California.

== Legacy ==
Several awards in the field of biochemistry have been named for White, including at Oakland University in Michigan, Wayne State University, George Washington University School of Medicine and the Gladstone Institutes.

== Honors and awards ==
=== Awards ===
- 1935 – Traveling Fellowship, American Physiological Society, for the XVth International Congress of Physiology (Leningrad and Moscow)
- 1938 – Eli Lilly Prize in Biochemistry
- 1960 – Distinguished Alumni Award, University of Denver
- 1967 – Sesquicentennial Alumni Award, University of Michigan
- 1969 – Borden Award, Association of American Medical Colleges

=== Honorary degrees ===
- 1959 – Doctor of Humane Letters, Yeshiva University
- 1975 – Doctor of Science, University of Denver

=== Elected memberships ===
- National Academy of Sciences (elected 1970)
- American Academy of Arts and Sciences (elected 1968)
- American Society of Biological Chemists
- Biochemical Society
- American Chemical Society
- American Society for Cell Biology
- American Institute of Nutrition
- Endocrine Society
- Society for Experimental Biology and Medicine
- American Association of Immunologists
- History of Science Society
- New York Academy of Sciences (Fellow)
- Harvey Society (Council 1956–1959; Vice-president 1965–1966; President 1966–1967)
- Laurentian Hormone Conferences (Cofounder and Member, Board of Directors and Program Committee)

=== Honorary memberships ===
- Harvey Society (1947 lecture)
- Alpha Omega Alpha
