= Steven Block =

American biophysicist

Steven Michael Block
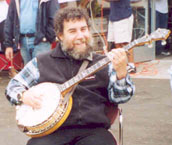
- Born: October 4, 1952 (age 73); Durham, North Carolina
- Education: Oxford University; University of Colorado at Boulder; California Institute of Technology
- Scientific career
- Workplaces: Rowland Institute for Science; Harvard University; Princeton University; Stanford University
- Doctoral advisor: Howard Berg
- Doctoral students: Polly Fordyce; William Greenleaf; Joshua Shaevitz

Steven M. Block (born 1952) is an American biophysicist and Professor at Stanford University with a joint appointment in the departments of Biology and Applied Physics. In addition, he is a member of the scientific advisory group JASON, a senior fellow of Stanford's Freeman Spogli Institute for International Studies, and an amateur bluegrass musician. Block received his B.A. and M.A. from Oxford University. He has been elected to the U.S. National Academy of Sciences (2007) and the American Academy of Arts and Sciences (2000) and is a winner of the Max Delbruck Prize of the American Physical Society (2008), as well as the Single Molecule Biophysics Prize of the Biophysical Society (2007). He served as President of the Biophysical Society during 2005-6. His graduate work was completed in the laboratory of Howard Berg at the University of Colorado and Caltech. He received his Ph.D. in 1983 and went on to do postdoctoral research at Stanford. Since that time, Block has held positions at the Rowland Institute for Science, Harvard University, and Princeton University before returning to Stanford in 1999.

As a graduate student, Block picked apart the adaptation kinetics involved in bacterial chemotaxis. As an independent scientist, Block has pioneered the use of optical tweezers, a technique developed by Arthur Ashkin, to study biological enzymes and polymers at the single-molecule level. Work in his lab has led to the direct observation of the 8 nm steps taken by kinesin and the sub-nanometer stepping motions of RNA polymerase on a DNA template. While consulting for the United States government through JASON, Block has researched the many threats associated with bioterrorism and headed influential studies on how advances in genetic engineering have impacted biological warfare.

== Selected publications ==
- Keir C Neuman; Steven M. Block (1 September 2004). "Optical trapping". Review of Scientific Instruments. 75 (9): 2787–2809. doi:10.1063/1.1785844. ISSN 0034-6748. PMC 1523313. PMID 16878180. Wikidata Q24669585.
- K Svoboda; C F Schmidt; B J Schnapp; S M Block (1 October 1993). "Direct observation of kinesin stepping by optical trapping interferometry". Nature. 365 (6448): 721–727. doi:10.1038/365721a0. ISSN 1476-4687. PMID 8413650. Wikidata Q36774439.
- Svoboda K; Block SM (1 January 1994). "Biological applications of optical forces". Annual Review of Biophysics and Biomolecular Structure. 23: 247–285. doi:10.1146/annurev.bb.23.060194.001335. ISSN 1056-8700. PMID 7919782. Wikidata Q36722681.
- Michelle D. Wang; Hong Yin; Robert Landick; Jeff Gelles; Steven M. Block (1 March 1997). "Stretching DNA with optical tweezers". Biophysical Journal. 72 (3): 1335–1346. doi:10.1016/s0006-3495(97)78780-0. ISSN 0006-3495. PMC 1184516. PMID 9138579. Wikidata Q28237199.
- S M Block; L S Goldstein; B J Schnapp (1 November 1990). "Bead movement by single kinesin molecules studied with optical tweezers". Nature. 348 (6299): 348–352. doi:10.1038/348348a0. ISSN 1476-4687. PMID 2174512. Wikidata Q33957127.
