= Phillips Robbins =

American biochemist (1930–2026)

Phillips Wesley Robbins
- Born: August 10, 1930; Barre, Massachusetts, U.S.
- Died: August 31, 2026 (aged 96); Lincoln, Massachusetts, U.S.
- Education: DePauw University, University of Illinois
- Scientific career
- Fields: Biochemistry
- Workplaces: Massachusetts Institute of Technology, Boston University
- Doctoral advisor: Herbert E. Carter

Phillips Wesley Robbins (August 10, 1930 – August 31, 2026) was an American biochemist and academic who was a professor emeritus in the department of molecular and cell biology at the Boston University School of Dental Medicine. He moved to BU in 1998 following a career of almost 40 years on the faculty at the Massachusetts Institute of Technology.

== Early life and education ==
Robbins was born on August 10, 1930 in Barre, Massachusetts, and attended high school in West Springfield, Massachusetts. He later described a high school physics course as an inspiration for his plans for a science career, though he continued to consider following the family tradition by becoming a medical missionary. He settled on biochemistry as his chosen field as an undergraduate at DePauw University, from which he graduated in 1952. He received his Ph.D. in 1955 from the University of Illinois under the supervision of Herbert E. Carter and then became a postdoctoral fellow with Fritz Lipmann, first at Massachusetts General Hospital and then moving with the group to Rockefeller University.

== Academic career ==
Robbins joined the faculty at the Massachusetts Institute of Technology in 1960 as one of several young biochemists hired by Jack Buchanan into the department of biology. There he worked particularly closely with Salvador Luria, studying the structure and biochemistry of lipopolysaccharides. Notable trainees from that era include Harvard University molecular biologist Richard Losick.

In 1998, after nearly 40 years at MIT, Robbins moved to the Boston University School of Dental Medicine, where he worked in collaboration with John Samuelson and with two of his own former postdoctoral fellows, department head Carlos Hirschberg and associate dean Maria Kukuruzinska.

He received the Eli Lilly Award in Biological Chemistry in 1966, was elected to the National Academy of Sciences in 1982 and received the Karl Meyer Award for Lifetime Achievement in Glycobiology in 2000.

== Research ==
Robbins' research focused on a variety of biochemical pathways. In his early career at MIT, he worked closely with Luria studying the structure and biosynthesis of lipopolysaccharide s, including elucidating the structure of bactoprenol and identifying the direction of chain elongation in LPS synthesis in bacteria. He later moved on to studying the biochemistry of the eukaryotic N-linked glycosylation pathway and then later, with John Samuelson, studied the evolution of this pathway in protists. He also worked on the problem of chitin synthesis and its role in yeast.

== Death ==
Robbins died in Lincoln, Massachusetts on August 31, 2026, at the age of 96.
