= Academic Press =

Academic book publisher

- Parent company: Elsevier
- Founded: 1941
- Founder: Walter J. Johnson (a.k.a. Walter Jolowicz, 1908–1996); Kurt Jacoby (1893–1968)
- Country of origin: United States
- Headquarters location: Cambridge, Massachusetts
- Nonfiction topics: Science
- Official website: elsevier.com/academic-press

Academic Press (AP) is an academic book publisher of Elsevier specializing in scientific, technical, and medical literature. Founded in 1941 in New York City, it was acquired by Harcourt, Brace & World in 1969. Following Reed Elsevier's acquisition of Harcourt in 2001, Academic Press became part of Elsevier. Thus, Academic Press became an imprint of Elsevier.

== Publications ==
Academic Press publishes books and reference materials in fields including communications engineering, economics, environmental science, finance, food science, geophysics, life sciences, mathematics, neuroscience, psychology, and the physical sciences.

Well-known products include the Methods in Enzymology series and encyclopedias such as The International Encyclopedia of Public Health and the Encyclopedia of Neuroscience.
