= Kevan Shokat =

American biochemist

Kevan Michael Shokat
- Born: August 26, 1964 (age 62); Boulder City, Nevada, US
- Education: Reed College; University of California, Berkeley
- Known for: Kinase signaling
- Scientific career
- Fields: Chemical biology
- Workplaces: Princeton University; University of California, San Francisco
- Doctoral advisor: Peter G. Schultz
- Other academic advisors: Christopher Goodnow

Kevan Michael Shokat (born August 26, 1964) is an American chemical biologist. He is a Professor and chair in the Department of Cellular and Molecular Pharmacology at University of California, San Francisco, a professor in the Department of Chemistry at University of California, Berkeley, and an Investigator with the Howard Hughes Medical Institute.

== Biography ==
Shokat received his B.A., in chemistry from Reed College in 1986, completing his thesis, "Synthesis of a precursor of PRCPCP, a non-hydrolyzable analog of phosphoribosylpyrophosphate (PRPP)," under the supervision of Ron McClard. He earned his Ph.D. from the University of California, Berkeley in 1991, under Peter G. Schultz.

== Research ==
Shokat is one of the leading figures in the field of chemical genetics. He uses methods of bioorganic chemistry to elucidate signal transduction pathways at the single cell and whole organism levels, and is particularly interested in protein kinases, and developing methods to elucidate the particular targets of each kinase, such as the Bump and hole method.

In 2013 Shokat published the first covalent inhibitors of KRAS G12C using a tethering screen. Following this strategy many pharma companies have developed KRAS programs leading to phase I/II clinical trials in this space, a landmark for what was once thought to be an undruggable oncogene.

== Honors and awards ==
- 1996 Pew Scholar
- 1997 Searle Scholar
- 1997 Cottrell Scholar
- 1997 Glaxo-Wellcome Scholar in Organic Chemistry
- 1999 Alfred P. Sloan Research Fellow
- 2000 Protein Science Young Investigator Award
- 2002 Eli Lilly Award in Biological Chemistry
- 2009 Elected to the National Academy of Sciences
- 2010 Elected to the National Academy of Medicine
- 2011 Elected to the American Academy of Arts and Sciences
- 2011 Ronald Breslow Award for Achievement in Biomimetic Chemistry
- 2017 Pharmacology Krebs Lecture, University of Washington
- 2017 Jonathan Kraft Prize for Excellence in Cancer Research
- 2017 Frank H. Westheimer Prize
- 2019 ASPIRE Award, The Mark Foundation
- 2020 Alfred Bader Award in Bioinorganic or Bioorganic Chemistry
- 2021 Samuel Waxman Cancer Research Foundation Breakthrough Science Award
- 2022 AACR Award for Outstanding Achievement in Chemistry in Cancer Research
- 2023 NAS Award for Scientific Discovery
- 2023 Howard Vollum Award
- 2023 The Sjöberg Prize
