= Janet McCarter Woolley =

American bacteriologist

- Born: March 31, 1906; Duluth, Minnesota, U.S.
- Died: January 28, 1996 (aged 89); Bountiful, Utah, U.S.
- Education: University of Wisconsin–Madison
- Spouse: Dilworth Wayne Woolley
- Scientific career
- Fields: Bacteriology
- Workplaces: University of Wisconsin–Madison

Janet McCarter Woolley (March 4, 1906 – January 28, 1996) was an American bacteriologist. She was awarded a Guggenheim Fellowship in 1944, for her work in immunology.

== Early life and education ==
Janet Ruth McCarter was born in 1906 in Duluth, Minnesota, the daughter of William and Mary Blackburn McCarter. She briefly attended Carleton College, and earned three degrees (Bachelor of Science in 1930, Master of Science in 1931, and Ph.D. in 1933) at the University of Wisconsin. As a doctoral student, she worked with professor E. G. Hastings on tubercule bacilli, which became the focus of her own work for decades.

== Career ==
In 1944, while she was an assistant professor in the Department of Agricultural Bacteriology at the University of Wisconsin, Janet McCarter was awarded a Guggenheim Fellowship for her work in immunology, especially as applied to tuberculosis. That year, more women were awarded Guggenheim Fellowships than in any previous year; Henry Allen Moe, secretary of the Guggenheim Foundation, assured reporters that "It's not due to the war and the fact that there are fewer men. These women would have received fellowships if they had applied in a year when there was no war."

Publications by Janet McCarter included:

- (with E. G. Hastings) "Misnamed Cultures and Studies of the Tubercle Bacillus" Science (1932)
- (with E. G. Hastings) "The Morphology of the Mycobacteria" Journal of Bacteriology (1934)
- "New Knowledge to Fight Germ of Boils and Food Poisoning" The Science News-Letter (1937)
- (with E. G. Hastings), "The Presence of Avian Tubercle Bacilli in Apparently Pure Cultures of Diphtheroids" Journal of Infectious Diseases (1939)
- (with Elizabeth M. Kanne), "Egg Mediums for the Isolation of All Three Types of Tubercle Bacilli" Journal of Infectious Diseases (1942)
- (with Dorothy M. Powelson), "The Cultivation of Human Tubercle Bacilli on Egg Mediums" Journal of Infectious Diseases (1944)

Janet McCarter married a colleague, biochemical researcher Dilworth Wayne Woolley, in 1945, and collaborated with him on projects, and "played an essential role in his work". In particular, Dr. McCarter Woolley read scientific articles aloud for her husband, who was blind.

== Personal life ==
Janet McCarter Woolley was widowed in 1966, and died in 1996, age 89, in Bountiful, Utah.
