= Stanley Cohen (biochemist) =

American biochemist (1922–2020)

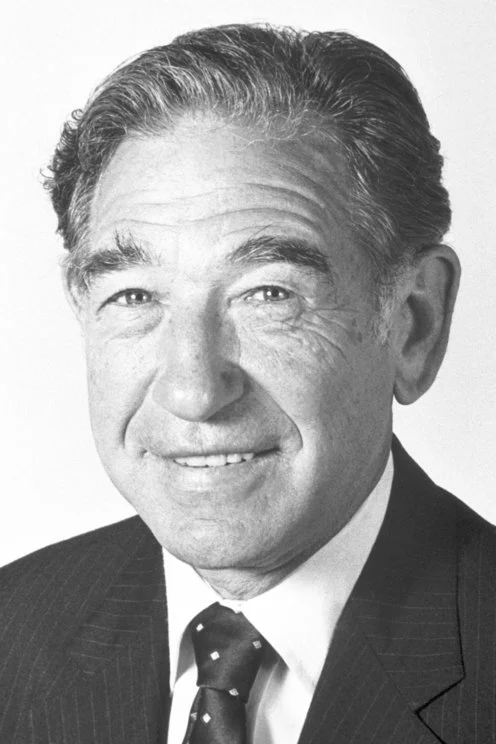
- Stanley Cohen c. 1986
- Born: November 17, 1922; Brooklyn, New York, U.S.
- Died: February 5, 2020 (aged 97); Nashville, Tennessee, U.S.
- Education: University of Michigan; Oberlin College; Brooklyn College
- Known for: Nerve growth factor
- Awards: Rosenstiel Award (1981); Louisa Gross Horwitz Prize (1983); Albert Lasker Award for Basic Medical Research (1986); Nobel Prize in Physiology or Medicine (1986); Franklin Medal (1987)
- Scientific career
- Fields: Biochemistry
- Workplaces: Vanderbilt University (1959–1999); Washington University in St. Louis (1953–1959)
- Thesis: The Nitrogenous Metabolism of the Earthworm (1949)
- Doctoral advisor: Howard B. Lewis

Stanley Cohen (November 17, 1922 – February 5, 2020) was an American biochemist who, along with Rita Levi-Montalcini, was awarded the Nobel Prize in Physiology or Medicine in 1986 for the isolation of nerve growth factor and the discovery of epidermal growth factor.

== Early life and education ==
Cohen was born in Brooklyn, New York, on November 17, 1922. He was the son of Fannie (née Feitel) and Louis Cohen, a tailor. His parents were Jewish immigrants. Cohen received his bachelor's degree in 1943 from Brooklyn College, where he had double-majored in chemistry and biology. After working as a bacteriologist at a milk processing plant to earn money, he received his Master of Arts in zoology from Oberlin College in 1945. He earned a doctorate from the department of biochemistry about the metabolism of earthworms at the University of Michigan in 1948.

== Career ==
His first academic employment was at the University of Colorado studying the metabolism of premature babies. In 1952 he moved to Washington University in St. Louis, working first in the department of radiology, learning isotope methodology, and then in the department of zoology. Working with Rita Levi-Montalcini, he isolated nerve growth factor. He later isolated a protein that could accelerate incisor eruption and eyelid opening in newborn mice, which was renamed epidermal growth factor. He continued research on cellular growth factors after joining the faculty of Vanderbilt University School of Medicine in 1959.

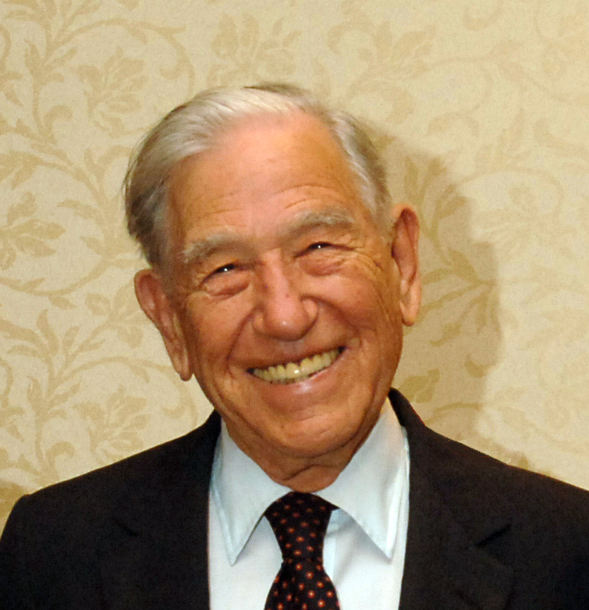
Cohen in 2007

In 1999, Cohen retired from Vanderbilt University. He died in February 2020 at the age of 97.

== Awards and legacy ==
Cohen received the Louisa Gross Horwitz Prize from Columbia University together with Rita Levi-Montalcini in 1983, the Nobel Prize in Physiology or Medicine in 1986 for the isolation of nerve growth factor and the discovery of epidermal growth factor and the National Medal of Science in 1986. His research on cellular growth factors has proven fundamental to understanding the development of cancer and designing anti-cancer drugs.

His Scopus h-index value was 82 as of March 2022.

== See also ==
- List of Jewish Nobel laureates
