= PAC-1 =

Chemical compound

Identifiers
- IUPAC name: 2-(4-benzylpiperazin-1-yl)-N-[(2-hydroxy-3-prop- 2-enyl-phenyl)methylideneamino]acetamide
- CAS Number: 315183-21-2
- PubChem CID: 1185541
- IUPHAR/BPS: 5238
- ChemSpider: 12272376
- UNII: 9LIS8N0B2C
- CompTox Dashboard (EPA): DTXSID30897425
- ECHA InfoCard: 100.164.322

Chemical and physical data
- Formula: C_{23}H_{28}N_{4}O_{2}
- Molar mass: 392.503 g·mol^{−1}
- 3D model (JSmol): Interactive image
- SMILES: C=CCc3cccc(/C=N\NC(=O)CN2CCN(Cc1ccccc1)CC2)c3O
- InChI: InChI=1S/C23H28N4O2/c1-2-7-20-10-6-11-21(23(20)29)16-24-25-22(28)18-27-14-12-26(13-15-27)17-19-8-4-3-5-9-19/h2-6,8-11,16,29H,1,7,12-15,17-18H2,(H,25,28)/b24-16-; Key:YQNRVGJCPCNMKT-JLPGSUDCSA-N

PAC-1 (first procaspase activating compound) is a synthesized chemical compound that selectively induces apoptosis, in cancerous cells. (Note: This article refers to the anti-tumor molecule, and not the a2iib3 integrin activation specific antibody of the same name) It was granted orphan drug status by the FDA in 2016.

== History ==
PAC-1 was discovered in Paul J. Hergenrother's laboratory at the University of Illinois at Urbana–Champaign during a process that screened many chemicals for anti-tumor potential. This molecule, when delivered to cancer cells, signals the cells to self-destruct by activating an "executioner" protein, procaspase-3. Then, the activated executioner protein begins a cascade of events that destroys the machinery of the cell. In 2011, Vanquish Oncology Inc. was founded to move PAC-1 forward to a human clinical trial. In 2013, Vanquish announced a multimillion-dollar angel investment into the company. In 2015, a phase I clinical trial of PAC-1 opened for enrollment of cancer patients, and in 2016, it was announced that PAC-1 had been granted Orphan Drug Designation for treatment of glioblastoma by the FDA, and in late 2017 a Phase 1b trial began of PAC-1 plus temozolomide for treatment of patients with recurrent glioblastoma or anaplastic astrocytoma.

== Mechanism of action ==
In cells, the executioner protein, caspase-3, is stored in its inactive form, procaspase-3. This way, the cell can quickly undergo apoptosis by activating the protein that is already there. This inactive form is called a zymogen. Procaspase-3 is known to be inhibited by low levels of zinc. PAC-1 activates procaspase-3 by chelating zinc, thus relieving the zinc-mediated inhibition. This allows procaspase-3 to be an active enzyme, and it can then cleave another molecule of procaspase-3 to active caspase-3. Caspase-3 can further activate other molecules of procaspase-3 in the cell, causing an exponential increase in caspase-3 concentration. PAC-1 facilitates this process and causes the cell to undergo apoptosis quickly.

This direct procaspase-3 activation mode-of-action for PAC-1 has been confirmed by other laboratories: In 2013 by the Megeney lab during the course of studies on the role of caspase-3 in cardiomyocytes, in 2014 by the Wu lab in an extensive study on the anticancer activity and mode-of-action of PAC-1 and derivatives, and in 2015 by the Gandhi lab in an exploration of the potential of PAC-1 and derivative B-PAC-1 for treatment of chronic lymphocytic leukemia (CLL).

Studies with knockout cells have suggested the importance of procaspase-7 as a secondary or alternate target for PAC-1, especially in the absence of procaspase-3. For example, experiments using mouse embryonic fibroblasts (MEFs) demonstrate that the double knockout of the CASP3 and CASP7 genes leads to cells that are insensitive to the proapoptotic effects of the PAC-1 class of compounds, and knocking in either CASP3 or CASP7 once again sensitizes these cells to PAC-1-type compounds. Recent experiments using cancer cell lines with CRISPR deletion of CASP3 are also consistent with this result. The activation of procaspase-7 by PAC-1 is consistent with biochemical data, although the relative importance of the procaspase-7 target in cells with functional procaspase-3 is uncertain.

A potential selectivity problem arises because procaspase-3 is present in most cells of the body. However, it has been shown that in many cancers, including certain neuroblastomas, lymphomas, leukemias, melanomas, and liver cancers, procaspase-3 is present in higher concentrations. For instance, lung cancer cells can have over 1000 times more procaspase-3 than normal cells. Therefore, by controlling the dosage, one can achieve selectivity between normal and cancerous cells.

In addition to its stand-alone activity, PAC-1 has also been shown to markedly synergize with a variety of approved cancer drugs, for example with BRAF and MEK inhibitors in mouse models of melanoma, and with conventional chemotherapeutic agents such as doxorubicin in pet dogs with spontaneous cancers including lymphoma and metastatic osteosarcoma, and with temozolomide in pet dogs with naturally occurring glioma.

Vanquish Oncology reported their intention to begin a Phase I human clinical trial in cancer patients to begin in early 2015, and indeed the Phase 1 trial of PAC-1 opened for enrollment in February 2015 (NCT02355535). This trial is being conducted at the University of Illinois Cancer Center in Chicago, at the Sidney Kimmel Cancer Center at Johns Hopkins, and at Regions Hospital in St. Paul, MN. A Phase 1b trial of PAC-1 plus temozolomide opened in late 2017 at the same three sites (NCT03332355); patients with high grade glioma (glioblastoma multiforme (GBM) or anaplastic astrocytoma) after progression following standard first line therapy are eligible for this trial.

== Animal trials ==
PAC-1 is notable for the unique path it has taken to the clinic, as it is possibly the only cancer drug to first be rigorously evaluated in pet dogs with spontaneous cancer as a prelude to the human clinical trial. In 2010, a study showed PAC-1 to be safe for dogs, and a second study published later that same year reported that a PAC-1 derivative (called S-PAC-1) was well tolerated in a small phase I clinical trial of dogs with lymphoma. More recently, in addition to this single-agent activity PAC-1 has shown to potently synergize with approved cancer drugs, for example with doxorubicin in the treatment of pet dogs with lymphoma and metastatic osteosarcoma, and with temozolomide in treating pet dogs with spontaneous glioma.

== Human clinical trials ==
PAC-1 has been or is currently being tested in the following human clinical trials:

1. Clinical trial number NCT02355535 for "Procaspase Activating Compound-1 (PAC-1) in the Treatment of Advanced Malignancies - Component 1" at ClinicalTrials.gov
2. Clinical trial number NCT03332355 for "Procaspase Activating Compound-1 (PAC-1) in the Treatment of Advanced Malignancies - Component 2" at ClinicalTrials.gov
3. Clinical trial number NCT03927248 for "PAC-1 for Treatment of Refractory, Metastatic Kidney Cancer" at ClinicalTrials.gov
