= Joshua Shaevitz =

American biophysicist

Joshua William Shaevitz
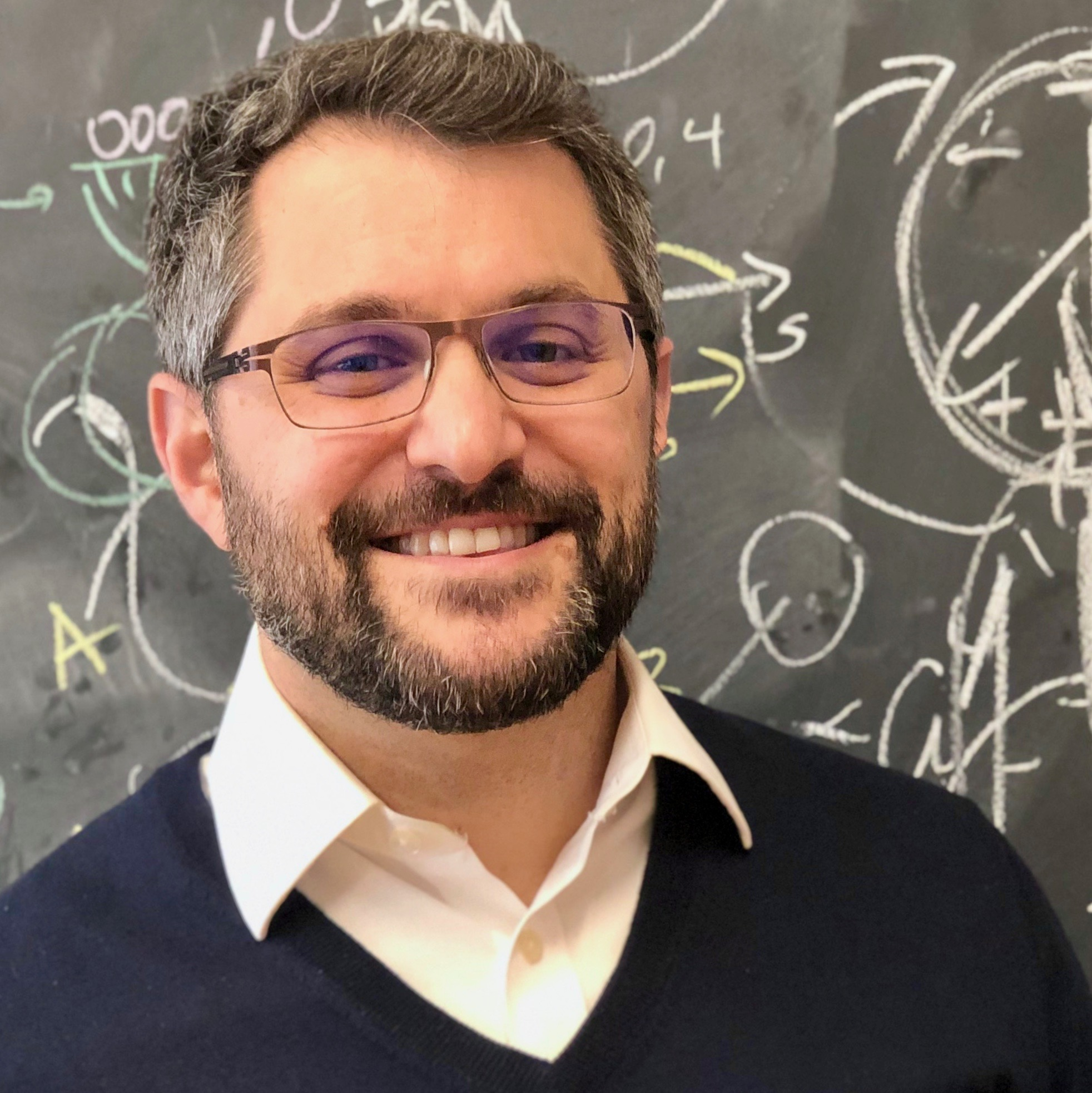
- Joshua William Shaevitz at Princeton in 2019.
- Born: November 6, 1977 (age 49); Los Angeles, CA
- Education: Columbia University; Stanford University
- Scientific career
- Workplaces: University of California, Berkeley; Princeton University
- Doctoral advisor: Steven Block
- Website: shaevitzlab.princeton.edu

Joshua Shaevitz (born 1977) is an American biophysicist and Professor of Physics at the Lewis-Sigler Institute at Princeton University in Princeton, NJ. He is known for his work in single-molecule biophysics, bacterial growth and motility, and animal behavior.

== Education and early career ==
Shaevitz completed his bachelor's degree in physics at Columbia University in New York in 1999 where he was an I. I. Rabi Scholar. He received his PhD in 2004 from Stanford University where he studied the molecular motors kinesin and RNA polymerase using optical tweezers in the group of Steven Block. Shaevitz then moved to the University of California, Berkeley as a Miller Fellow. There, he focused on the motility of bacteria, including the actin-propelled Rickettsia rickettsii, Myxococcus xanthus, and the wall-less Spiroplasma. Since 2007, Shaevitz has been on the faculty of Princeton University with appointments in the Department of Physics and the Lewis-Sigler Institute for Integrative Genomics where he holds the rank of Professor.

== Research ==
Shaevitz's work focuses on precision measurements in a variety of biological systems, focusing on topics related to cell shape in bacteria, active matter and pattern formation in groups of moving cells, and the quantification of animal behavior.

His group pioneered the use of 3D live-cell imaging to study the shape of bacteria during growth. In a series of papers, Shaevitz and colleagues unraveled how a cell-wall insertion mechanism with helical coordination can produce cells with the correct shape in both rod and helical cells. His group also studies bacterial cell mechanics, including bending rigidity, turgor pressure and cell wall stiffness, and pressure regulation.

Shaevitz also has worked on the mechanisms of gliding motility and collective behavior in the social bacterium Myxococcus xanthus. This work includes measurement of the mechanochemistry of individual gliding motors inside live bacteria and the connection between active matter phase transitions and evolutionarily advantageous fruiting body formation.

A third thread to Shaevitz's research involves the quantification of animal behavior using supervised and unsupervised machine learning algorithms. Shaevitz and Princeton Neuroscience professor Mala Murthy published an automated system (LEAP) for measuring animal pose from large movie data sets. This has recently been extended to multi-animal data in a package called SLEAP. His work has extended to understanding the dynamics of animal behavior through unsupervised clustering methods in collaboration with Princeton Physics colleague William Bialek and others.

== Scientific activities ==
- Aspen Center for Physics, General Member, 2019–present
- Co-director, NSF Physics Frontier Center for the Physics of Biological Function, 2017–present
- Physical Review Letters Divisional Associate Editor, 2017–2023
- Human Frontier Science Program Career Development Award Selection Committee, 2017–2019
- American Physical Society Division of Biological Physics (DBIO) Member at Large, 2013–2016
- American Physical Society Division of Biological Physics (DBIO) Executive Committee Chair (2024)
- Pew Scholars Alumni Nomination Review Panel, 2013–2019

== Awards and honors ==
- Elected Fellow of the American Physical Society for "fundamental contributions to the understanding of the mechanics and dynamics of biological systems, from single molecules to cell collectives to behaving animals, through the development of new techniques for precision measurement", 2019
- Presidential Early Career Award for Scientists and Engineers (PECASE), 2009
- Pew Scholar in the Biomedical Sciences, 2009
- Sloan Research Fellowship, 2008
- Miller Institute for Basic Research in Science Postdoctoral Fellowship, 2004–2007
- Physics Department Alfred Moritz Michaelis Award, Columbia University, 1999
- I. I. Rabi Scholarship, Columbia University, 1995–1999
