= Alessio Ciulli =

Italian British biochemist

Alessio Ciulli FRS FRSE FRSC
- Born: 22 July 1977 (age 49); Florence, Italy
- Education: University of Florence(laurea), University of Cambridge(PhD)
- Scientific career
- Fields: Targeted Protein Degradation, Chemical Biology
- Workplaces: University of Dundee
- Thesis: Biophysical studies of protein-ligand-interactions
- Doctoral advisors: Chris Abell
- Website: https://www.lifesci.dundee.ac.uk/people/alessio-ciulli-0; https://www.dundee.ac.uk/cetpd

Alessio Ciulli FRS FMedSci FRSE FRSC (born 22 July 1977) is an Italian British biochemist. Currently, he is the Professor of Chemical & Structural Biology at the Faculty of Life Sciences, University of Dundee, where he founded and directs Dundee' Centre for Targeted Protein Degradation (CeTPD). He is also the scientific co-founder and advisor of Amphista Therapeutics.

== Early life and education ==
Alessio Ciulli was born in Florence on 22 July 1977. He attended University of Florence in his hometown with an undergraduate laurea in chemistry and graduated summa cum laude. Under the late Prof Ivano Bertini, his final year laurea project was in computational drug design and NMR spectroscopy of matrix metalloproteases. Awarded with a Gates Cambridge Scholarship, he did his PhD under the supervision of the late Professor Chris Abell at the University of Cambridge and in collaboration with Astex Technology (now Astex Pharmaceuticals) produced a thesis concerned with studying weak protein-ligand interactions using biophysical and structural methods.

== Career ==
Ciulli remained in Cambridge University to conduct post-doctoral research on fragment-based drug discovery with Professor Abell and Professor Tom L. Blundell, under a College Junior Research Fellowship. Between February and June 2009, Ciulli went to Yale University as Human Frontier Science Programme visiting fellow to visit the laboratory of Professor Craig Crews and returned to Cambridge University to start his independent research career. While at Cambridge, Ciulli was a group leader as BBSRC David Phillis Fellow in the Department of Chemistry, and the Director of Studies in Chemistry at Christ's College. In April 2013, he took up a Readership in Chemical & Structural Biology as a principal investigator within the Division of Biological Chemistry and Drug Discovery in the University of Dundee. Ciulli was promoted as the Professor of Chemical & Structural Biology in the same division in October 2016. In 2017, he co-founded Amphista Therapeutics, a company that focuses on developing drugs based on targeted protein degradation. He was elected to the Fellowship of the Royal Society of Edinburgh in 2023, to the Fellowship of the Royal Society in 2025, and to the Fellowship of the Academy of Medical Sciences in 2026.

== Research ==
With his team in the Ciulli laboratory, Ciulli's works aim to develop small molecules inducing targeted protein degradation and modulating protein-protein interactions. One example of this type of work is the discovery of proteolysis-targeting chimera or PROTAC and its therapeutic potential. Recruitment of an E3 ligase to the target protein by the PROTAC is a critical step in the mechanism of action, because it triggers the target protein to be ubiquitinated and then degraded by the proteasome. Ciulli and his colleagues were the first to produce an X-ray crystal structure of a class of PROTAC simultaneously bound to the target protein and the E3 ubiquitin ligase. Much of Ciulli's research also contributed to studies on the von Hippel-Lindau protein E3 ligase, especially in targeting the E3 ligase with small molecules. In general, Ciulli's scientific contributions focus on targeted protein degradation (TPD) and related induced-proximity modalities as a therapeutic strategy in cancer and other diseases. His works on TPD led to the founding of Amphista Therapeutics. Amongst the other scientific accomplishments and discoveries of his laboratory, is the development of a chemical-genetic "bump and hole" approach in which Ciulli and colleagues designed an engineered mutant variant of BET bromodomains able to accommodate selectively its binding ligand, enabling the individual roles of BET proteins to be elucidated. This later led to the development of BromoTag for rapid, selective induced degradation of any target proteins.

== Awards ==
- 2009: BBSRC David Phillips Fellowship
- 2012: ERC Starting Grant
- 2014: Talented Young Italians Award (Research and Innovation)
- 2015: EFMC Prize for Young Medicinal Chemist in Academia
- 2015: ICBS Young Chemical Biologist Award
- 2016: RSC Capps Green Zomaya Award
- 2016: MedChemComm Emerging Investigator Lectureship
- 2016: Fellow of the Royal Society of Chemistry (FRSC)
- 2022: Prous Institute-Overton and Meyer Award for New Technologies in Drug Discovery
- 2023: Fellow of the Royal Society of Edinburgh (FRSE)
- 2024: Cancer Research Horizons CRH Innovation and Entrepreneurship “Further, Faster, Together” (Industry-Academia Collaboration) Award (University of Dundee-Boehringer Ingelheim)
- 2025: Biochemical Society Industry and Academic Collaboration Award (AC-BI PROTAC Team)
- 2025: Fellow of the Royal Society
- 2025: Crews & Deshaies Award for the Induced Proximity Innovator of the Year (inaugural awardee)
- 2025: RSC BMCS Hall of Fame and Medal 2025
- 2026: Alexander M. Cruickshank Lecturer Award (Induced Proximity Modalities and Therapeutics GRC)
- 2026: Fellow of the Academy of Medical Sciences (FMedSci)
