= Bradley L. Pentelute =

American biochemist

- Born: December 5, 1977 (age 48)
- Education: University of Southern California (USC) (B.A., Psychology, B.S., Chemistry) University of Chicago (M.S., Chemistry, Ph.D., Organic Chemistry) Harvard Medical School (Fellowship)
- Occupation: Professor of Chemistry at Massachusetts Institute of Technology(MIT)
- Known for: Automated flow peptide synthesis Pi-clamp bioconjugation mechanism Anthrax toxin delivery system Xenoprotein engineering Affinity selection-mass spectrometry
- Awards: Collier Award Damon Runyon-Rachleff Innovation Award Sontag Distinguished Scientist Award NSF CAREER Award Sloan Research Fellowship Amgen Young Investigator Award Eli Lilly Award
- Website: http://www.pentelutelabmit.com/

Bradley Lether Pentelute (born December 5, 1977) is currently a professor of chemistry at the Massachusetts Institute of Technology (MIT). His research program lies at the intersection of chemistry and biology and develops bioconjugation strategies, cytosolic delivery platforms, and rapid flow synthesis technologies to optimize the production, achieve site-specific modification, enhance stability, and modulate function of a variety of bioactive agents. His laboratory successfully modified proteins via cysteine-containing “pi-clamps” made up of a short sequence of amino acids, and delivered large biomolecules, such as various proteins and drugs, into cells via the anthrax delivery vehicle. Pentelute has also made several key contributions to automated synthesis technologies in flow. These advances includes the invention of the world's fastest polypeptide synthesizer. This system is able to form amide bonds at a more efficient rate than standard commercial equipment and has helped in the process of understanding protein folding and its mechanisms. This automated flow technology was recently used to achieve total chemical synthesis of protein chains up to 164 amino acids in length that retained the structure and function of native variants obtained by recombinant expression. The primary goal of his endeavor is to use these processes to create designer biologics that can be used to treat diseases and solve the manufacturing problem for on-demand personalized therapies, such as cancer vaccines.

== Education and career ==
Pentelute grew up in San Diego, California, and earned both his B.A. in Psychology and B.S. in Chemistry from the University of Southern California in 2003. He continued his studies at the University of Chicago, where he earned his M.S. and Ph.D. in chemistry in the laboratory of Stephen Kent. After receiving his Ph.D., Pentelute served as a senior scientist at Ethos Pharmaceuticals in 2008. He completed a postdoctoral fellowship at Harvard Medical School from 2008 to 2011 with R. John Collier in Microbiology. In 2011, Pentelute began his assistant professorship at the Massachusetts Institute of Technology (MIT), was awarded tenure in 2017 and promoted to Professor of Chemistry in 2021.

== Research ==
=== Automated fast-flow synthesis of biopolymers ===
The Pentelute laboratory designs fully automated fast-flow machines to accelerate the chemical manufacture of sequence-defined biopolymers. It has built an efficient machine that can produce amide bonds an order of magnitude faster than commercially available instruments. The machine is inspired by Nature's ribosome that can make proteins in minutes. While the Pentelute group's fast-flow technology is not as fast as the ribosome, it can form one amide bond in 7 seconds. This technology not only facilitates rapid polypeptide generation but it has enabled the group to carry out entire D-scans of proteins to investigate folding and functions. This technology was used to achieve stepwise total chemical synthesis of functional protein chains and was adapted to produce phosphorodiamidate morpholino oligomers (PMO) in flow. Automated flow technology may be used to solve the manufacturing problem for on-demand personalized therapies, such as cancer vaccines, and to design engineered biologics, such as dimeric transcription factor mimetics.

=== Pi-clamp bioconjugation ===
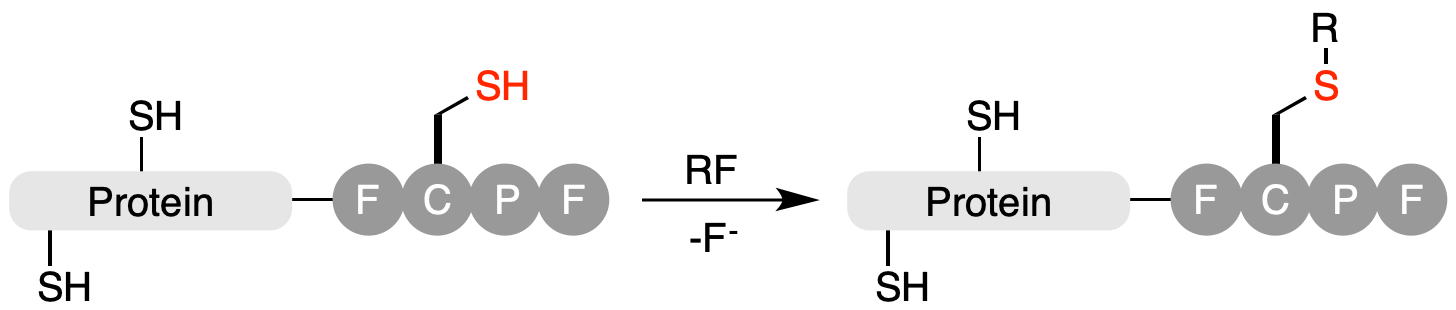
A reagent binding to the cysteine site of an amino acid sequence (pi-clamp) to modify the protein's structure

Selecting a cellular site and modifying its characteristics to perform specific functions is one of the most complex studies done in chemistry. Typical modification techniques involved using a catalyst or reaction pairs to change a site of interest. Cysteine residues were used in modifying proteins via bioconjugation because they acted as natural catalysts, however they lacked the ability to target specific sites. Pentelute was inspired to create a new site-selecting approach by altering an amino acid's environment in a peptide sequence. Hence, Pentelute and his lab created an amino acid sequence consisting of phenylalanine, cysteine, proline, and phenylalanine, known as the pi-clamp, to selectively modify a cysteine site in proteins. Having been made from natural compounds, the pi-clamp reacts with a perfluoroaromatic reagent and the cysteine thiol site, thus causing an overall decrease in the reaction's activation energy. Additional advantages of this pi-clamping technique compared to non-natural methods include the clamp being of small size and being able to have direct interaction with the site. This new approach for modification of cells helped researchers target site-specific cells and label proteins without the use of enzymes, which makes the modification process more efficient. A significant use of this method has been applied through the successful killing of breast cancer cells.

=== Anthrax toxin delivery ===
Moving peptide and protein therapeutics through the plasma membrane of cells has been made more efficient through the use of a platform made from the anthrax lethal toxin (PA/LFN), which arises from the bacterium Bacillus anthracis. Pentelute's lab took more than two decades to develop this delivery vehicle. His studies of intracellular delivery help us understand the movements of proteins and to explore different biological functions within cells. Previous techniques to transport molecules through the plasma membrane of mammalian cells proved to be less effective and required higher concentrations of substance to be useful. When compared, the anthrax lethal toxin based delivery method was proved to transport proteins faster and more efficiently. Through the use of chemical ligation (NCL) and enzyme-mediated ligation using Sortase A (SrtA), non-native cargos that contain functionalities that don't naturally occur can be created that provide benefits such as increased stability to internal degradation of the cell, added use of affinity handles, and adjusted connective affinities to target molecules. These fusions also attach the resulting peptides to the N-terminus of the native lethal factor (LFN).

== Awards and honors ==
- 2003: USC Renaissance Scholar
- 2003: USC Chemistry Alumni Award for Outstanding Undergraduate Research
- 2006: Student Travel Award for Australian Peptide Society
- 2008: Poster Prize, Science at the Interface (University of Chicago)
- 2010: Collier Award, Gordon Conference, Microbial Toxins and Pathogenicity
- 2012: Vallee Foundation Travel Award
- 2013: Damon Runyon-Rachleff Innovation Award
- 2013: Young Chemical Biologist Award, International Chemical Biology Society
- 2013: Sontag Distinguished Scientist Award
- 2014: NSF CAREER Award
- 2015: Sloan Research Fellowship in Chemistry
- 2015: Novartis Early Career Award in Organic Chemistry
- 2016: Amgen Young Investigator Award
- 2018: Eli Lilly Award in Biological Chemistry
- 2021: Rao Makineni Lectureship, American Peptide Society
