= Michelle Wang =

Chinese-American physicist

Michelle Dong Wang
- Education: University of Michigan; Nanjing University; Chinese Academy of Sciences; University of Southern Mississippi
- Scientific career
- Thesis: Reaction and aggregation dynamics of cell surface receptors (1993)

Michelle Dong Wang is a Chinese-American physicist who is the James Gilbert White Distinguished Professor of the Physical Sciences at Cornell University. She is an Investigator of the Howard Hughes Medical Institute. Her research considers biomolecular motors and single molecule optical trapping techniques. She was appointed Fellow of the American Physical Society in 2009 and the Biophysical Society in 2024.

== Early life and education ==
Wang earned her bachelor's degree in nuclear physics at Nanjing University. She moved to the Chinese Academy of Sciences for her graduate studies, where she majored in physics and earned a doctorate in 1986. Wang moved to the United States in 1986, where she worked toward a master's degree at the University of Southern Mississippi. She completed a second doctorate at the University of Michigan. Wang was a postdoctoral fellow at Princeton University.

== Research and career ==
In 1998, Wang was appointed assistant professor at Cornell University, where she was made Professor in 2009. Wang is interested in single-molecule biophysics. Her research considers biological molecular motors, including RNA polymerase molecules which move along the DNA template during cell division. During this process genetic information is transferred from DNA into new RNA. DNA motor proteins often experience roadblocks, including binding proteins that can interfere with essential biological processes. Wang has looked to understand the interactions between histones and DNA in nucleosomes.

Wang has pioneered several structural probes to better understand molecular motors, including angular optical trapping, DNA unzipping and nanophotonics. Angular optical traps isolate birefringent particles within a polarized laser beam. The particles can be rotated by rotating the polarization of the laser, which allows for the precise control and identification of biological molecules which are attached to the birefringent particles. To perform these optical rotation measurements, Wang makes use of bio-functionalized quartz nano-cylinders. Building on her experiences in photonics, Wang created an electro-optofluidic platform that can be used to trap single molecules. These traps use photonic interference to create three-dimensional on-chip optical traps at the antinodes of the standing waves of an evanescent field.

== Awards and honors ==
- 2000 W. M. Keck Foundation Distinguished Young Scholar award
- 2008 Cornell University Provost's Award for Distinguished Scholarship
- 2008 Howard Hughes Medical Institute Investigator
- 2009 Elected Fellow of the American Physical Society
- 2023 Elected to Member of the National Academy of Sciences
- 2024 Elected Fellow of the Biophysical Society

== Selected publications ==
- Michelle D. Wang; Hong Yin; Robert Landick; Jeff Gelles; Block, Steven M. (1997). "Stretching DNA with optical tweezers". Biophysical Journal. 72 (3): 1335–1346. doi:10.1016/s0006-3495(97)78780-0. PMC 1184516. PMID 9138579. Wikidata Q28237199.
- Brent D Brower-Toland; Corey L Smith; Richard C Yeh; John T Lis; Craig L Peterson; Michelle D Wang (2002). "Mechanical disruption of individual nucleosomes reveals a reversible multistage release of DNA". Proceedings of the National Academy of Sciences of the United States of America. 99 (4): 1960–1965. Bibcode:2002PNAS...99.1960B. doi:10.1073/pnas.022638399. PMC 122302. PMID 11854495. Wikidata Q34011797.
- Michelle D. Wang; M. J. Schnitzer; H. Yin; Robert Landick; Jeff Gelles; Block, Steven M. (1998). "Force and velocity measured for single molecules of RNA polymerase". Science. 282 (5390): 902–907. Bibcode:1998Sci...282..902W. doi:10.1126/science.282.5390.902. PMID 9794753. Wikidata Q52232915.
