= Methods in Enzymology =

- Discipline: Biochemistry
- Language: English
- Edited by: David W. Christianson, Karen Allen

Publication details
- History: 1955-present
- Publisher: Academic Press
- Impact factor: 1.682 (2021)

Standard abbreviations
- ISO 4: Methods Enzymol.

Indexing
- CODEN: MENZAU
- ISSN: 0076-6879

Links
- Journal homepage

Methods in Enzymology is a book-series of scientific publications focused primarily on research methods in biochemistry by Elsevier, originally created by Sidney P. Colowick and Nathan O. Kaplan.

== Content ==
Historically, each volume has centered on a specific topic of biochemistry, such as DNA repair, yeast genetics, or the biology of nitric oxide. In recent years, however, the range of topics covered has broadened to also include biotechnology, chemical biology, and cell biology.

Each Volume and Chapter includes not only background knowledge but also specific research techniques, detailed experimental procedures and methods. Video elements are also present.

== History ==
First published in 1955, there are (2022) more than 650 volumes in the collection, with ca. 16 new Volumes being published each year.

== Editors-in-Chief ==
The series is currently edited by David W. Christianson (University of Pennsylvania) and Karen Allen (Boston University). Each volume is guest-edited and contributed to by expert researchers in the field.
