= Howard Hang =

American chemist

Howard C. Hang
- Education: University of California, Berkeley; University of California, Santa Cruz; Harvard Medical School and Whitehead Institute for Biomedical Research
- Known for: Contributions in the field of chemical biology
- Awards: Eli Lilly Award in Biological Chemistry (2017); Ellison Medical Foundation New Scholar Award (2008); Irma T. Hirschl/Monique Weill-Caulier Trust Research Award (2007)
- Scientific career
- Fields: chemistry, chemical biology
- Workplaces: The Scripps Research Institute
- Thesis: Chemical approaches to the study of mucin-type O-linked glycosylation (2003)
- Doctoral advisor: Carolyn R. Bertozzi

Howard Chi Hang is an American chemist and professor in the Department of Immunology and Microbiology and Department of Chemistry at The Scripps Research Institute. He was previously Richard E. Salomon Family Associate Professor and the head of the Laboratory of Chemical Biology and Microbial Pathogenesis at the Rockefeller University in New York City. He won the Eli Lilly Award in Biological Chemistry in 2017.

== Education and career ==
Hang earned a BS in Chemistry from the University of California, Santa Cruz in 1998, and a PhD in chemistry from the University of California, Berkeley in 2003 where he carried out research in the group Professor Carolyn Bertozzi. He then worked with Professor Hidde Ploegh at Harvard Medical School and the Whitehead Institute of Biomedical Research from 2004 through 2006 as a Damon Runyon Cancer Research Foundation Postdoctoral Fellow. He set up his own lab at the Rockefeller University in 2007 and moved to The Scripps Research Institute in 2020.

== Research ==
Hang's work involves developing chemical methods to understand mechanisms of how immune cells and invading microbes interact, and to develop new methods to combat infections.
