= Chen Lan-bo =

Taiwanese biotechnologist

- 陳良博
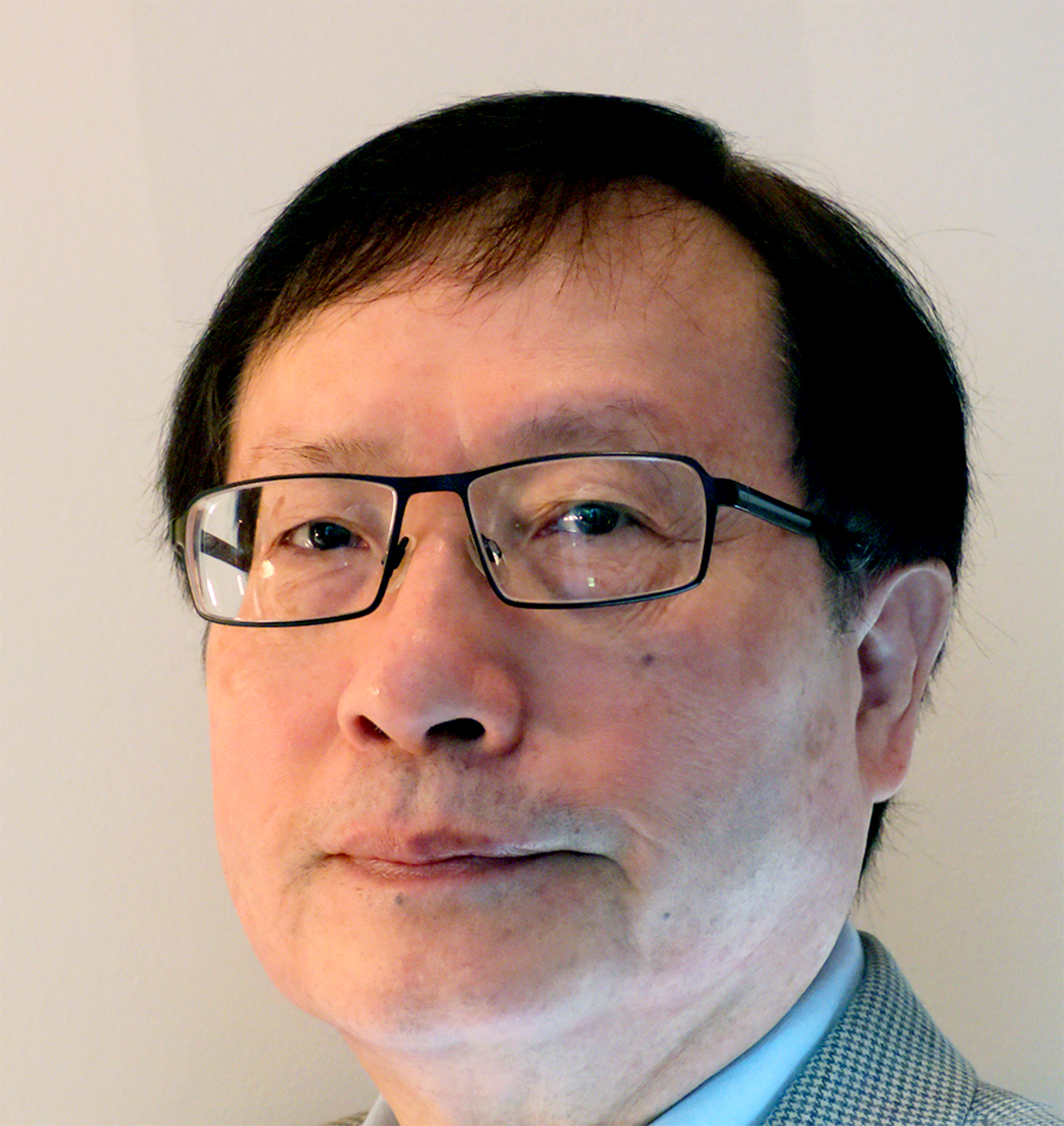
- Chen in 2016
- Born: August 23, 1943 (age 83); Yilan County, Taiwan
- Education: National Taiwan University (BS); Massachusetts Institute of Technology (MS, PhD)
- Awards: Received American Cancer Society Professor Award
- Scientific career
- Fields: Pathology; Biotechnology
- Workplaces: Cold Spring Harbor Laboratory; Harvard Medical School; Academia Sinica
- Doctoral advisor: John Buchanan
- Other academic advisors: James Watson

Chinese name
- Traditional Chinese: 陳良博
- Simplified Chinese: 陈良博
Transcriptions
Standard Mandarin
- Hanyu Pinyin: Chén Liángbó
- Website: connects.catalyst.harvard.edu/Profiles/display/Person/79699

Chen Lan-bo (Chinese: 陳良博; born August 23, 1943) is a Taiwanese cellular biologist, pathologist, and biotechnologist. He was a professor of pathology at Harvard Medical School between 1977 and 2004 and is the author of over 250 publications. He is also a member of Boston's Dana-Farber Cancer Institute in the department of cancer and biology and a member of Academia Sinica in Taiwan.

== Early life and education ==
Chen was born on 23 August 1943 in Yilan County during the Japanese rule of Taiwan. He graduated from National Taiwan University with a Bachelor of Science (B.S.) in 1968, then completed graduate studies in the United States, earning a Master of Science (M.S.) in 1972 and his Ph.D. in cell biology in 1975, both from the Massachusetts Institute of Technology (MIT) under biologist John Buchanan.

== Research and career ==
Chen did postdoctoral research work for one year supervised by James D. Watson, the Nobel laureate who co-discovered the DNA double helix structure. He did research on the mitogenicity of thrombin and surface alterations on mouse splenocytes and also on intercellular LETS glycoprotein matrices.

He is also a cell biologist making seminal findings in the multiple fields of molecular cell biology and cancer biology, including the discovery of rhodamine 123 for highly specific fluorescent localization of mitochondria in living cells, removal of carcinoma cells from contaminated bone marrow using the lipophilic cation, identification of human cancer line without any Intermediate filaments, and also on the development of the rare event detection system to detect lung cancer cells from Body fluids.

In the early days of his career, he worked as a Senior Staff investigator at the Cold Spring Harbor Laboratories, before becoming a full and emeritus professor of pathology at the Harvard Medical School with laboratories at the Dana-Farber Cancer Institute.

Chen founded Synta Pharmaceuticals Corporation, and in 2007, was invited to serve on the founding board of directors for Yu Chang Biologics Company, also known as TaiMed Biologics Company. Chen was supportive of Tsai Ing-wen's 2012 presidential campaign after Tsai's involvement with TaiMed became a subject of investigation. Chen described the Sunflower Student Movement of 2014 as "the mightiest movement Taiwan has seen in several decades" and said that "this student movement will kick-start the development of Taiwan’s biotech industry." In January 2019, Chen signed a petition opposing the confirmation of Kuan Chung-ming as president of National Taiwan University.

== Awards and honors ==
Chen received the American Cancer Society Professor award, and, in 1996, was elected as a member of the Academia Sinica. He also served as a former board member at Madrigal Pharmaceuticals.

== Publications ==
Chen has published over 250 publications. His contributions include the following:

- Lan Bo Chen. "Mitochondrial Membrane Potential in Living Cells". Annual Review of Cell Biology.
- Lan Bo Chen, Andrew Murray, Rosalind A. Segal, Anne Bushnell, and Marcia L. Walsh. "Studies on intercellular LETS glycoprotein matrices". Journal of the cell.
- L B Chen, P H Gallimore, and J K McDougall. "Correlation between tumor induction and the large external transformation sensitive protein on the cell surface". Journal of PNAS.
- Lan Bo Chen. "Fluorescent Labeling of Mitochondria". Methods in cell biology.
- L.B.Chen, N.Maitland, P.H.Gallimore, and J.K.McDougall. "Detection of the large external transformation-sensitive protein on some epithelial cells". Journal of Experimental cell research.
- L.B.Chen, N.N.H.Teng, and J.M.Buchanan. "Mitogenicity of thrombin and surface alterations on mouse splenocytes". Journal of Experimental cell research.
- Lan Bo Chen and John M. Buchanan. "Plasminogen-Independent Fibrinolysis by Proteases Produced by Transformed Chick Embryo Fibroblasts". JSTOR.
- Lan Bo Chen, Keith Burridge, Andrew Murray, Marcia L. Walsh, Christine D. Copple, Anne Bushnell, James K. McDougall, and Phillip H. Gallimore. "Modulation of Cell Surface Glycocalyx: Studies on Large, External, Transformation-Sensitive Protein". Annals of the New York Academy of Sciences.
- Faith E. Davies, Ann M. Dring, Cheng Li, Andrew C. Rawstron, Masood A. Shammas, Sheila M. O'Connor, James A.L. Fenton, Teru Hideshima, Dharminder Chauhan, Isabella T. Tai, Elizabeth Robinson, Daniel Auclair, Karen Rees, David Gonzalez, A. John Ashcroft, Ranjit Dasgupta, Constantine Mitsiades, Nicholas Mitsiades, Lan B. Chen, Wing H. Wong, Nikhil C. Munshi, Gareth J. Morgan, and Kenneth C. Anderson. "Insights into the multistep transformation of MGUS to myeloma using microarray expression analysis". Blood Journal.
- Xiuwei Yang, Christoph Claas, Stine-Kathrein Kraeft, Lan Bo Chen, Zemin Wang, Jordan A. Kreidberg, and Martin E. Hemler. "Palmitoylation of Tetraspanin Proteins: Modulation of CD151 Lateral Interactions, Subcellular Distribution, and Integrin-dependent Cell Morphology". Molecular Biology of the cell.
