= Lisa Steiner =

American immunologist

- Born: Austria
- Education: Swarthmore College, Yale School of Medicine
- Scientific career
- Fields: Immunology
- Workplaces: Massachusetts Institute of Technology

Lisa Steiner is a professor of immunology in the department of biology at the Massachusetts Institute of Technology. When she arrived at MIT in 1967, she was the first woman faculty member in the department. Her research focuses on the evolution and development of the immune system, using zebrafish as a model organism.

== Early life and education ==
Steiner was born in Austria and left the country with her mother shortly before the Anschluss. She spend the rest of her childhood in Queens, New York. She won the well-known Westinghouse Science Talent Search competition as a high school student but chose to major in mathematics at Swarthmore College, where she received her bachelor's degree. Deterred from pursuing graduate school in math at Princeton University because the department did not admit women at the time, she instead attended Harvard University for a short time before deciding to change her career path by applying to medical school. She received her M.D. from Yale School of Medicine in 1959. She then worked as a postdoctoral fellow with Herman Eisen at the Washington University School of Medicine, where she began her research in immunology.

== Academic career ==
Steiner was recruited to MIT in 1967 by Jack Buchanan, who headed the Division of Biochemistry within the biology department and was actively seeking out new young faculty. She has remained at MIT since and continues to maintain an active research program. Steiner was involved in efforts led by Nancy Hopkins and joined by Mary-Lou Pardue and others to study the effects of gender discrimination on women faculty at MIT and bring the problem to the attention of then-President Charles Vest. In 1994, Steiner was one of 16 women faculty in the School of Science at MIT who drafted and co-signed a letter to the then-Dean of Science (now Chancellor of Berkeley) Robert Birgeneau, which started a campaign to highlight and challenge gender discrimination at MIT.

Steiner received a Helen Hay Whitney Foundation fellowship to work with Eisen as a postdoctoral fellow and has continued her involvement with that organization, currently serving as its vice president.

== Research ==
Steiner's research focuses on the evolution and development of the immune system in vertebrates, using as a model organism the zebrafish (Danio rerio). The group is particularly interested in early events in cellular differentiation defining the lymphocytic lineage, and in the development of the lymphoid organs. Steiner has also worked with the molecular genetics of the zebrafish immune system.

Her studies on the folding of the enzyme Ribonuclease A were fundamental to Christian Anfinsen's later Nobel Prize in Chemistry (see also Anfinsen's dogma), although the importance was not recognized by her superiors at the time.
