= James Dahlberg =

James Eric Dahlberg is an emeritus professor of biomolecular chemistry at the University of Wisconsin–Madison. His research focuses on the biology of RNA. He was elected to the United States National Academy of Sciences in 1996.

== Education ==
Dahlberg earned his bachelor's degree from Haverford College in 1962 and his Ph.D. from the University of Chicago in 1966. He completed his postdoctoral training at the MRC Laboratory of Molecular Biology in Cambridge with Frederick Sanger from 1966 to 1968 followed by additional work at the University of Geneva from 1968 to 1969.

== Career ==
Dahlberg joined the faculty at the University of Wisconsin Department of Physiological Chemistry, which eventually became the Department of Biomolecular Chemistry, in 1969. He was promoted to full professor in 1974. He retired from the university in 2005, but still manages a small lab. He and colleague Lloyd smith formed Third Wave Technologies, a company that produced a technology to detect genetic variations. He was on the board of the Morgridge Institute for Research from 2009 to 2014 and served briefly as interim CEO.

== Honors and awards ==
- 1974 – Eli Lilly Award in Biological Chemistry
- 1996 – Elected to the National Academy of Sciences
