= Lingyin Li =

American academic and chemical biologist

- Born: 1981 (age 44–45); Xi'an
- Education: University of Wisconsin–Madison; University of Science and Technology of China
- Scientific career
- Workplaces: Stanford University, Arc Institute
- Thesis: Synthetic surfaces to control cell fate (2010)

Lingyin Li (born 1981) is a Chinese American chemical biologist who is a professor of biochemistry at Stanford University and core investigator at Arc Institute. Her research studies the chemical biology of innate immunity to design better therapeutics. She was named one of Chemical & Engineering News Talented 12 in 2020.

== Early life and education ==
Li was born in Xi'an. She was awarded a position on the competitive University of Science and Technology of China undergraduate program. She was a doctoral researcher at the University of Wisconsin–Madison, where she worked with Laura L. Kiessling. She moved to Harvard Medical School as a postdoctoral researcher in the laboratory of Tim Mitchison.

== Research and career ==
Li uses chemical biology to understand the mechanisms that underpin immunity, which she will use to develop new therapeutic pathways and targets. The activation of immunity can provide new therapeutic strategies for vaccines, cancer and viral infection.

At Harvard, she studied the drug Vadimezan (DMXAA), an activator of the stimulator of interferon genes (STING) pathway, and uncovered that DMXAA binds mouse but not human STING. STING responds to inflammation and activates inflammatory proteins that trigger the adaptive immune system. The combination of the innate and adaptive immune system eliminates pathogens and is predicted to fight cancer. Li also discovered ENPP1 as the first known hydrolase of cGAMP, the natural ligand and activator of STING. ENPP1 is an extracellular enzyme, which led her to propose that cGAMP is exported for degradation and thus must play an extracellular role in cancer.

In 2015, Li set up her own lab at Stanford University where she pioneered the study of the paracrine role of extracellular cGAMP in innate immunity and coined the phrase immunotransmitter. Her lab identified several transporters of the immunotransmitter cGAMP including SLC19A1, SLC46A2, LRRC8A:C, and SLC7A1. While many in the field have pursued STING agonists as a strategy for cancer immunotherapy, Li proposed an alternative strategy to sustain extracellular cancer signaling through the inhibition of the cGAMP hydrolases ENPP1 and ENPP3. She founded Angarus Therapeutics to develop ENPP1 inhibitors, which are now being tested in clinical trials.

In 2022, Li became one of the first core investigators at the Arc Institute, a nonprofit research organization that operates in partnership with Stanford University, UCSF, and UC Berkeley.

== Awards and honors ==
- 2017 National Institutes of Health New Innovator Award
- 2017 Ono Pharma Foundation Awardee
- 2020 C&EN's Talented Twelve
- 2022 Eli Lilly Award in Biological Chemistry

== Selected publications ==
- Lingyin Li; Qian Yin; Pia Kuss; Zoltan Maliga; José L Millán; Hao Wu; Timothy J Mitchison (26 October 2014). "Hydrolysis of 2'3'-cGAMP by ENPP1 and design of nonhydrolyzable analogs". Nature Chemical Biology. 10 (12): 1043–1048. doi:10.1038/nchembio.1661. ISSN 1552-4450. PMC 4232468. PMID 25344812. Wikidata Q34514089. (erratum)
- Sabrina L Ergun; Daniel Fernandez; Thomas M Weiss; Lingyin Li (20 June 2019). "STING Polymer Structure Reveals Mechanisms for Activation, Hyperactivation, and Inhibition". Cell. 178 (2): 290-301.e10. doi:10.1016/j.cell.2019.05.036. ISSN 0092-8674. PMID 31230712. Wikidata Q92967166.
- Carozza, J. A., Böhnert, V., Nguyen, K. C., Skariah, G., Shaw, K. E., Brown, J. A., Rafat, M., von Eyben, R., Graves, E. E., Glenn, J. S., Smith, M., & Li, L. (2020). Extracellular cGAMP is a cancer cell-produced immunotransmitter involved in radiation-induced anti-cancer immunity Nature cancer, 1(2), 184–196.
- Mardjuki, R., Wang, S., Carozza, J., Zirak, B., Subramanyam, V., Abhiraman, G., Lyu, X., Goodarzi, H., & Li, L. (2024). Identification of the extracellular membrane protein ENPP3 as a major cGAMP hydrolase and innate immune checkpoint Cell reports, 43(5), 114209.
- Merad, M., Posey, A. D., Jr, Olivero, O., Singh, P. K., Mouneimne, G., Li, L., Wallace, L. M., & Hayes, T. K. (2020). Diversity Is a Strength of Cancer Research in the U.S. Cancer cell, 38(3), 297–300.
- Cao, X., Cordova, A. F., & Li, L. (2022). Therapeutic Interventions Targeting Innate Immune Receptors: A Balancing Act Chemical reviews, 122(3), 3414–3458.
