= Polly Fordyce =

Stanford University Professor of BioEngineering

- Born: Washington, DC, USA
- Education: University of Colorado Boulder, BS; Stanford University, PhD
- Known for: High-throughput enzymology, biophysics, microfludiics
- Awards: Eli Lilly Award in Biological Chemistry; National Science Foundation CAREER Award; Fellow of the American Association for the Advancement of Science
- Scientific career
- Fields: Bioengineering
- Workplaces: Stanford University
- Doctoral advisor: Steven Block
- Other academic advisors: Joseph DeRisi
- Website: www.fordycelab.com

Polly Fordyce is an Associate Professor of Genetics and Bioengineering and fellow of the ChEM-H Institute at Stanford University. Her laboratory's research focuses on developing and applying new microfluidic platforms for quantitative, high-throughput biophysics and biochemistry and single-cell genomics.

Fordyce was born and raised in Washington, DC.

== Education ==
Fordyce double-majored in physics and biology at the University of Colorado Boulder, graduating in 2000. She then began a PhD in the lab of Steven Block at Stanford University, where she worked as part of a team that developed new microscopes for applying force to molecules and understanding how it affected their movements. After receiving her PhD in 2007, she moved to UCSF to pursue postdoctoral research in Joseph DeRisi's laboratory developing high-throughput methods for the analysis of transcription factor interactions. She has been a professor at Stanford since 2014.

== Research ==
Fordyce's lab develops approaches for high throughput quantitative biochemistry, biophysics, and single cell assays, using a variety of approaches including microfluidics. One of her lab's accomplishments is the development of the method HT-MEK (High-Throughput Microfluidic Enzyme Kinetics), which enables researchers to analyze the effects of thousands of mutations on an enzyme's activity in a single experiment.

== Awards ==
- Graduate Research Fellow, National Science Foundation (2002–2005)
- G. J. Lieberman Fellow, Stanford University (2003–2004)
- Helen Hay Whitney Postdoctoral Fellowship, Helen Hay Whitney Foundation (2008–2011)
- Pathway to Independence Award (K99), NIH (2012–2014)
- Scialog Fellow, Gordon and Betty Moore Foundation (2016–2017)
- New Innovator Award (DP2), NIH (2016–2021)
- Alfred P. Sloan Foundation Research Fellow (2017–2019)
- Investigator, Chan Zuckerberg Biohub (2017–2022)
- Breakthrough Science Initiative Award, Ono Pharma Foundation (2019–2022)
- NSF CAREER Award (2022).
- Eli Lilly Award in Biological Chemistry (2023)
- Fellow of the American Association for the Advancement of Science, Section on Biological Sciences (2024)
- Schmidt Polymath award (2025)
