= Lolamicin =

Identifiers
CAS Number	2930690-12-1
3D model (JSmol)	Interactive image
ChemSpider	129381266
PubChem CID	168894634
- InChI: InChI=1S/C24H20N4O/c1-16-9-21(10-17(2)27-16)23-14-26-28-24(23)20-7-4-8-22(12-20)29-15-19-6-3-5-18(11-19)13-25/h3-12,14H,15H2,1-2H3,(H,26,28) Key: CIXIQLLJOWEAKU-UHFFFAOYSA-N
- SMILES: CC1=CC(=CC(C)=N1)C1=CNN=C1C1=CC=CC(OCC2=CC(=CC=C2)C#N)=C1

Properties
Chemical formula	C_{24}H_{20}N_{4}O
Molar mass	380.451 g·mol^{−1}
- Except where otherwise noted, data are given for materials in their standard state (at 25 °C [77 °F], 100 kPa). Infobox references

Lolamicin is an experimental antibiotic. It targets Gram-negative bacteria without significantly affecting typical gut microbes. Lolamicin was discovered by a team led by Paul J. Hergenrother at the University of Illinois Urbana-Champaign and was first reported in 2024.

In a mouse model of bacterial infection, lolamicin was found to be especially effective against Escherichia coli, Klebsiella pneumoniae, and Enterobacter cloacae.

Lolamicin works by interfering with the lipoprotein transport system of Gram-negative bacteria.

== Synthesis ==
Lolamicin is synthesized in five steps. Initially, methyl 3-hydroxybenzoate undergoes nucleophilic substitution with 3-(chloromethyl)benzonitrile in the presence of potassium carbonate, forming the corresponding ether. The ester is then hydrolyzed under basic conditions to yield the carboxylic acid. In a two-step process, the carboxylic acid is activated using PyBOP and reacted with N,O-dimethyl hydroxylamine hydrochloride to form the corresponding methoxamide. This intermediate is then subjected to condensation with 2,4,6-collidine under low-temperature conditions using lithium diisopropylamide (LDA), yielding a dimethylpyridine derivative. Finally, treatment with hydrazine monohydrate under reflux promotes cyclization to produce the final pyridine-pyrazole core structure of lolamicin.
