= Fabimycin =

Antibiotic

Names
- IUPAC name (E)-3-(7-amino-8-oxo-5,6,7,9-tetrahydropyrido[2,3-b]azepin-3-yl)-N-methyl-N-[(3-methyl-1-benzofuran-2-yl)methyl]prop-2-enamide

Identifiers
| 3D model (JSmol) | Interactive image |
| ChemSpider | 129303707 |
| PubChem CID | 156500281 |
- InChI: InChI=1S/C23H24N4O3/c1-14-17-5-3-4-6-19(17)30-20(14)13-27(2)21(28)10-7-15-11-16-8-9-18(24)23(29)26-22(16)25-12-15/h3-7,10-12,18H,8-9,13,24H2,1-2H3,(H,25,26,29)/b10-7+ Key: ZWQNEFFHBSGFHV-JXMROGBWSA-N
- SMILES: CN(CC1=C(C)C2=CC=CC=C2O1)C(=O)\C=C\C1=CC2=C(NC(=O)C(N)CC2)N=C1

Properties
| Chemical formula | C_{23}H_{24}N_{4}O_{3} |
| Molar mass | 404.470 g·mol^{−1} |
- Except where otherwise noted, data are given for materials in their standard state (at 25 °C [77 °F], 100 kPa). Infobox references

Fabimycin is an newly developed antibiotic candidate which is effective against gram-negative bacterias, an unusually problematic class of bacteria that uses thicker cell walls and molecular efflux pumps to protect themselves by preventing the antibiotics reaching inside the cells.

== Antibiotic resistance ==
Global deaths attributable to antimicrobial resistance (AMR) numbered 1.27 million in 2019. That year, AMR may have contributed to 5 million deaths and one in five people who died due to AMR were children under five years old. The European Centre for Disease Prevention and Control calculated that in 2015 there were 671,689 infections in the EU and European Economic Area caused by antibiotic-resistant bacteria, resulting in 33,110 deaths. Most were acquired in healthcare settings.

== History ==
Researchers modified the structure of Debio-1452, an under-development antibiotic that is active against gram positive bacteria, and its derivative, which is moderately effective against non-resistant gram-negative bacteria. The drug inhibits the bacterial enzyme enoyl-acyl carrier protein reductase (FabI), which is an important enzyme in bacterial fatty acid biosynthesis. Clinical trials targeting the enzyme for use in S. aureus (Gram +ve) infections have reached Phase 2 inhibitors.

Fabimycin was tested in mice against more than 200 colonies of resistant bacteria, across 54 strains of E. coli, Klebsiella pneumoniae and Acinetobacter baumannii. It cleared up pneumonia and urinary tract infections, pushing bacteria levels lower than before infection in mouse models.

Further, it did not affect some types of commensal bacteria present in the gut microbiome.

== See also ==
- Multiple drug resistance
- Methicillin-resistant Staphylococcus aureus
