= William F. Neuman =

American biochemist and author (1919-1981)

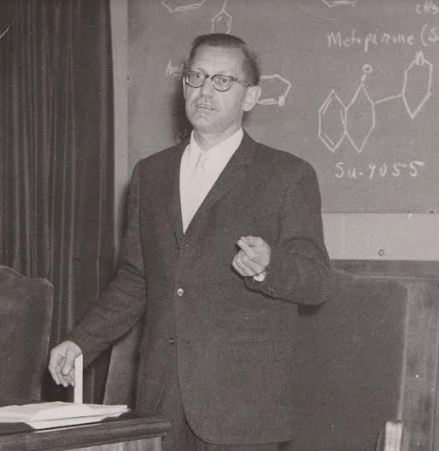
William F. Neuman

William F Neuman (June 2, 1919 in Petoskey, Michigan – January 4, 1981 in Rochester, New York) was an American biochemist and author.

== Career ==
Neuman was an authority on the biochemistry of bone tissue. Before joining the faculty of the University of Rochester in 1944, he headed the biochemistry section of the U.S. Atomic Energy Commission at the university and helped develop the field of health physics. In 1965 he was a member of the scientific team that studied the effects of space flight on astronauts Frank Borman and James A. Lovell after their fourteen-day flight on Gemini 7. Neuman was the author or co-author of more than two hundred scholarly publications.

The William F. Neuman Award, since 1981, has been presented annually by the American Society for Bone and Mineral Research for "outstanding and major scientific research" in bone and mineral research.

== Notable publications ==
- Neuman, William F.; Margaret W. (1958). The Chemical Dynamics of Bone Mineral. Chicago: The University of Chicago Press. ISBN 0-226-57512-8.
