= Dilworth Wayne Woolley =

Canadian-born American biochemist (1914–1966)

- Born: July 20, 1914; Raymond, Alberta Canada
- Died: July 23, 1966 (aged 52); Cuzco, Peru
- Occupation: Biochemist
- Years active: 1939-1966
- Spouse: Janet Ruth McCarter

Dilworth Wayne Woolley (July 20, 1914 – July 23, 1966) was a Canadian-born American biochemist, who did important work on vitamin deficiency, and was one of the first to study the role of serotonin in brain chemistry. He was nominated for a Nobel Prize in 1939, 1948, 1949, and 1950.

== Early life and education ==
Wayne Woolley was born in Raymond, Alberta, the son of Americans living in Canada. His extended family were prominent members of the Church of Jesus Christ of Latter-day Saints; his great-grandfather was Edwin Dilworth Woolley, was a prominent Latter-day Saint bishop in Salt Lake City.

Wayne Woolley (as he was known) was a precocious child who finished high school at age 13, and completed an undergraduate degree in chemistry at the University of Alberta at age 19. He pursued graduate studies in the department of agricultural chemistry at the University of Wisconsin, where he earned his PhD in 1939. His graduate research with Conrad Elvehjem concerned nicotinic acid as a treatment for canine blacktongue, with implications for human pellagra.

== Career ==
Woolley spent much of his career at the Rockefeller Institute for Medical Research in New York City. His major work focused on serotonin in brain chemistry: how substances such as LSD might affect the action of serotonin, how disorders of serotonin function might be responsible for mental disorders, and how serotonin might play a part in memory and learning. Though his career was shorter-lived than expected, subsequent work by others has developed many of Woolley's hypotheses in productive directions. One of his assistants, Robert Bruce Merrifield, won the Nobel Prize in Chemistry in 1984, for work on peptide synthesis they did together in the 1950s.

In 1940 Woolley received the Eli Lilly and Company-Elanco Research Award from the American Society for Microbiology. In 1948 he received Eli Lilly Award in Biological Chemistry from the American Chemical Society. In 1952 he was elected to membership in the National Academy of Sciences. He served as president of the Institute of Nutrition in 1959.

Woolley was an author on over 200 research papers and book articles in his thirty-year career. Books by Woolley included A Study of Antimetabolites (1952), and The Biochemical Bases of Psychoses (1962).

== Personal life ==
Woolley married bacteriologist Janet Ruth McCarter in 1945. Woolley had Diabetes mellitus type 1 from childhood, and in 1923 was among the first children to receive insulin to treat the condition. He nonetheless experienced blindness as a complication of his diabetes, and was completely blind from age 25 until his death from a heart attack at age 52, while hiking in Cuzco, Peru.
