= Hubert Bradford Vickery =

Canadian-American biochemist

Hubert Bradford Vickery (28 February 1893 – 27 September 1978) was a Canadian-American plant biochemist who conducted early experiments to determine the amino acid compositions of proteins. While serving as editor of the Journal of Biological Chemistry he standardized the use of the D (dextro) and L (laevo) prefixes to indicate optical isomerism in amino acids which was later incorporated into the IUPAC standard.

== Biography ==
Vickery was born in Yarmouth, Nova Scotia, the second son of Mary Katherine Dudman and Edgar Jenkins Vickery. His father, a bookshop owner, gifted him the book Fourteen weeks in chemistry by J. Dorman Steele for Christmas at the age of twelve which initiated a lifelong interest in chemistry. He then went to Dalhousie University, graduated with honours in chemistry, and taught at a high school in Halifax. This ended in December 1917 when a nearby ship exploded and damaged the school. Vickery then worked at the Imperial Oil Company as an analytical chemist. He received an MS in 1920 and then went to study organic chemistry at Yale University under Thomas B. Osborne. He studied the hydrolysis of gliadin for his PhD in 1922 and then worked at the Connecticut Agricultural Experiment Station, New Haven. Here his work was mainly on plant biochemistry, with work on alfalfa vitamins but this led to a study of alfalfa proteins. He then began to examine the amino acid composition of proteins and went on to examine those of haemoglobin. He examined the metabolism of tobacco plants. Another major contribution was the standardization of amino acid names under the IUPAC and representations of asymmetric carbons using the prefixes d and l. He also examined the history of protein and amino acid chemistry. He published an autobiographical review of his work as a plant biochemist in 1972.

During World War II he worked with Edwin J. Cohn at Harvard and was invited in 1946 to witness the Bikini atoll atomic bomb test. Vickery taught protein chemistry at Yale University until his retirement in 1963.
