= Nathan O. Kaplan =

American biochemist

- Born: June 25, 1917; New York
- Died: April 15, 1986 (aged 68); San Diego, California
- Education: UCLA
- Known for: Founding editor of Methods in Enzymology
- Scientific career
- Fields: Biochemistry
- Institutions: University of Illinois College of Medicine, Johns Hopkins University, Brandeis University, University of California, San Diego
- Thesis: Studies with P32 of the changes in the acid soluble phosphates in the liver coincident to alterations in carbohydrate metabolism (1943)
- Doctoral advisor: David M. Greenberg
- Notable students: J. Craig Venter

Nathan Oram Kaplan (June 25, 1917 – April 15, 1986) was an American biochemist who studied enzymology and chemotherapy.

== Biography ==
After completing a B.A. in chemistry at UCLA in 1939, Kaplan studied carbohydrate metabolism in the liver under David M. Greenberg at the University of California, Berkeley medical school. He earned his Ph.D. in 1943. From 1942 to 1944, Kaplan participated in the Manhattan Project, and then spent a year as an instructor at Wayne State University. From 1945 to 1949, Kaplan worked with Fritz Lipmann, G. David Novelli, and Beverly Guirard to study coenzyme A. Kaplan went to the University of Illinois College of Medicine as an assistant professor in 1949, and from 1950 to 1957 he worked at the McCollum-Pratt Institute of Johns Hopkins University. In 1957, he was recruited to head a new graduate program in biochemistry at Brandeis University. In 1968, Kaplan moved to the University of California, San Diego, where he studied the role of lactate dehydrogenase in cancer. He also founded a colony of nude mice, a strain of laboratory mice useful in the study of cancer and other diseases. In 1981, Kaplan became a founding member of the World Cultural Council.

Kaplan was, with Sidney Colowick, a founding editor of the scientific book series Methods in Enzymology. One of his students at the University of California was genomic researcher Craig Venter.
