= Ralph Weissleder =

American scientist

- Scientific career
- Fields: Clinical research, Molecular imaging, Systems biology
- Workplaces: Massachusetts General Hospital; Harvard Medical School

Ralph Weissleder (born November 8, 1958, in Zell am Harmersbach, Germany) is an American clinician scientist.

== Biography ==
Ralph Weissleder is a professor at Harvard Medical School, director of the Center for Systems Biology at Massachusetts General Hospital (MGH) and an attending interventional radiologist at MGH.

Weissleder graduated from University of Heidelberg in 1985. Following his degrees, Weissleder completed an Internship and residency at University Hospital, Monterrey, Mexico. Weissleder pursued his post-doctoral research (1986–1989) and clinical training in radiology at Massachusetts General Hospital (MGH) and at Harvard Medical School (HMS). In 1994, Weissleder became assistant professor at HMS, full professor in 2001 (Department of Radiology), and an active physician (interventional radiology) at Massachusetts General Hospital. In 2007, Weissleder was appointed director of the MGH Center for Systems Biology and in 2008, he was also appointed professor in systems biology at HMS. Weissleder is a member of the Dana-Farber/Harvard Cancer Center.

Weissleder has received honorary degrees from The Universidad Autonoma de Nuevo León, Mexico (2007) and from Harvard University (2001).

== Research ==
Dr. Weissleder is a researcher in biotechnology, especially in the fields of imaging and next-gen diagnostics. His research interests include the development of molecular imaging techniques, tools for early disease detection as well as the development of nanomaterials for sensing and systems analysis. His research is translational in nature and several of his developments have led to commercialized technologies and advanced clinical trials. He is cofounder of T2 Biosystems, Lumicell, Accure Health, VisEn Medical (acquired by Perkin Elmer), and an advisor to several other biotech companies (Moderna, Seer Bioscience, Boston Scientific).

== Clinical Practice ==
Dr. Weissleder's practices at Massachusetts General Hospital and he is a faculty member of the Department of Radiology and practices in interventional radiology with a particular focus on interventional oncology. His area of expertise is in percutaneous biliary procedures, of which he has performed over 3,000. He treats biliary cancers, stone disease, strictures, post surgical complications, transplants and congenital abnormalities.

He has trained over 200 clinical fellows and over 500 research fellows. He is a member of the Massachusetts General Physicians Organization.

== Awards and honors ==
He is an elected member of the National Academy of Medicine, the American Academy of Arts and Sciences and the German National Academy of Sciences (Leopoldina) His work has also been honored with numerous awards including the Millennium Pharmaceuticals Innovator Award (2003), the J. Taylor International Prize in Medicine (2004), the AUR Memorial Award, the ARRS President's Award, The Society for Molecular Imaging Lifetime Achievement Award, the Academy of Molecular Imaging 2006 Distinguished Basic Scientist Award, the 2008 RSNA Outstanding Researcher Award and the 2011 European Society of Radiology Gold Medal. Dr. Weissleder is ranked 23 in the world and 20 in United States by Research.com 2023 Ranking of Best Scientists in Biology and Biochemistry.
