= Sidney Colowick =

American biochemist

Sidney Paul Colowick
- Born: January 12, 1916; St. Louis, Missouri
- Died: January 9, 1985 (aged 68); Nashville, Tennessee, USA
- Education: Washington University in St. Louis; Washington University School of Medicine
- Known for: Founding editor of Methods in Enzymology
- Spouses: 1. Grace Shaffel; 2. Maryda Swanstrom
- Children: 4
- Awards: Eli Lilly Award in Biological Chemistry
- Scientific career
- Fields: Biochemistry
- Institutions: Washington University School of Medicine; University of Illinois; Johns Hopkins University; Vanderbilt University
- Doctoral advisor: Carl Cori
- Notable students: Paul Greengard

Sidney Paul Colowick (1916–1985) was an American biochemist, known for many contributions to metabolic biochemistry, especially glycogen metabolism, and as founding editor, with Nathan Kaplan, of the book series Methods in Enzymology.

== Career ==
Colowick studied at Washington University in St. Louis (B.S., M.S., Ph.D.) and Washington University School of Medicine and had his first academic appointment there. Subsequently, he worked at the Public Health Research Institute of New York City. He was associate professor of biochemistry at the University of Illinois from 1948 to 1950, and Professor of Biology at Johns Hopkins University from 1950 to 1959. In 1959 he moved to Vanderbilt University School of Medicine, as American Cancer Society–Charles Hayden Foundation Professor of Microbiology from 1959 until 1985.

He was particularly known for his work on hexokinase and the regulation of hexose transport in cultured animal cells. He also worked on coenzymes such as NADH ("TPNH_{2}").

He received the Eli Lilly Award in Biological Chemistry (1947), and was a member of the American Academy of Arts and Sciences (1969), and the National Academy of Sciences (1972).

== Personal life ==
Sidney Colowick was born on January 12, 1916, in St. Louis, MO. He married Grace Shaffel in 1943, with whom he had one son, and later Maryda Swanstrom in 1951, with whom he had three daughters. He died in Nashville, Tennessee on January 9, 1985.
