= Howard B. Lewis =

Howard Bishop Lewis (8 November 1887 – 7 March 1954) was a chemistry professor and past president of the American Society for Biochemistry and Molecular Biology (AMBSB).

Lewis was born on a farm near Southington, Connecticut. After earning a B.A. in 1908 from Yale University, he taught at Hampton Institute in Hampton, Virginia and the Centenary Collegiate Institute in Hackettstown, New Jersey. He returned to Yale in 1910 and finished his Ph.D. in 1913. Another source says he entered the graduate program at George Washington University.

From there, he became an instructor in physiological chemistry in the University of Pennsylvania medical school. In 1915, he accepted a position at the Urbana campus of the University of Illinois. In 1922, he accepted the position of head of the Department of Physiological Chemistry at the University of Michigan where, in 1947, he was appointed the John Jacob Abel University Professorship in Biological Chemistry. He was also director of the university's College of Pharmacy from 1933 to 1947.

His doctoral students include Stanley Cohen.

Lewis was elected in 1918 a fellow of the American Association for the Advancement of Science and in 1949 a member of the National Academy of Sciences.
