= LIPL =

LIPL may refer to:

- Lipoyl amidotransferase
- Octanoyl-(GcvH):protein N-octanoyltransferase
