= GCSH =

Protein-coding gene in the species Homo sapiens

Available structures
PDB	Ortholog search: PDBe RCSB
PDB	List of PDB id codes 2EDG

Identifiers
- Aliases: GCSH, GCE, NKH, glycine cleavage system protein H
- External IDs: OMIM: 238330; MGI: 1915383; HomoloGene: 90880; GeneCards: GCSH; OMA:GCSH - orthologs

Gene location (Human)
Chr.	Chromosome 16 (human)
Band	16q23.2	Start	81,081,945 bp
Band	16q23.2	End	81,096,395 bp
RNA expression pattern
Bgee	Human / Mouse (ortholog); Top expressed in: C1 segment; substantia nigra; amygdala; putamen; hypothalamus; hippocampus proper; caudate nucleus; nucleus accumbens; ventricular zone; right lobe of liver / n/a; More reference expression data
BioGPS	n/a
Gene ontology
Molecular function	aminomethyltransferase activity; protein binding
Cellular component	mitochondrial matrix; glycine cleavage complex; mitochondrion
Biological process	glycine decarboxylation via glycine cleavage system; glycine catabolic process; methylation; protein lipoylation
Sources:Amigo / QuickGO
Orthologs
Species	Human	Mouse
Entrez	2653	68133
Ensembl	ENSG00000140905	ENSMUSG00000034424
UniProt	P23434	Q91WK5
RefSeq (mRNA)	NM_004483	NM_026572
RefSeq (protein)	NP_004474	NP_080848
Location (UCSC)	Chr 16: 81.08 – 81.1 Mb	n/a
PubMed search
- Wikidata
View/Edit Human	View/Edit Mouse

Glycine cleavage system H protein, mitochondrial (abbreviated as GCSH) is a protein that in humans is encoded by the GCSH gene. Degradation of glycine is brought about by the glycine cleavage system (GCS), which is composed of 4 protein components: P protein (a pyridoxal phosphate-dependent glycine decarboxylase), H protein (a lipoic acid-containing protein; this protein), T protein (a tetrahydrofolate-requiring aminomethyltransferase enzyme), and L protein (a lipoamide dehydrogenase). The H protein shuttles the methylamine group of glycine from the P protein to the T protein. The protein encoded by GCSH gene is the H protein, which transfers the methylamine group of glycine from the P protein to the T protein. Defects in this gene are a cause of nonketotic hyperglycinemia (NKH). Two transcript variants, one protein-coding and the other probably not protein-coding, have been found for this gene. Also, several transcribed and non-transcribed pseudogenes of this gene exist throughout the genome.

== Function ==
The glycine cleavage system (GCS) is the major physiological pathway for glycine degradation in mammals and is confined to mitochondria of the liver, kidney, small intestine, pituitary, thyroid glands, and brain. The P-protein is a pyridoxal phosphate-dependent glycine decarboxylase that transfers the methylamine moiety of glycine to one of the thiol groups in the lipoyl component of H-protein, a hydrogen-carrier protein and the second component of the complex. The T-protein catalyzes the release of ammonia and transfer of the one-carbon fragment from the intermediate lipoyl residue to tetrahydrofolate, while the L-protein, a lipoamide dehydrogenase, catalyzes the oxidation of the dihydrolipoyl residue of H-protein and reduction of NAD.

== Structure ==
=== Gene ===
Human GCSH gene has 5 exons spanning 13.5kb and resides on chromosome 16 at q23.2.

=== Protein ===
The GCSH is a heat-stable small protein with a covalently attached lipoic acid prosthetic group which interacts with the three enzymes during the catalysis. The chemically determined amino acid sequence revealed that chicken H-protein is composed of 125 amino acids with a lipoic acid prosthetic group at lysine 59 (Lys59). Because of its restricted tissue expression in humans, H-protein purified from chicken liver has been routinely used for the assay. The H-protein comprises a mitochondrial targeting sequence and a mature mitochondrial matrix protein sequence. Its activation in vivo requires the attachment of a lipoic acid prosthetic group at Lys59 of the mature protein. The matrix protein sequence is highly conserved and chicken H-protein has 85.6% amino acid sequence similarity to the human form.

== Clinical significance ==
Nonketotic hyperglycinemia (NKH) is an inborn error of metabolism caused by deficiency in the glycine cleavage system (GCS). Enzymatic analysis has identified three metabolic lesions in NKH, deficiencies of P-, T-, and H-proteins. The first mutation identified in NKH was in the P-protein gene. Subsequently, some patients were found to have mutations in the T-protein gene. The structure, polymorphism, and expression of GCSH could facilitate the molecular analysis of patients with variant forms of NKH that are caused by H-protein deficiency.

== Interactions ==
GCSH has been shown to interact with the other glycine cleavage system protein components: P protein, T protein and L protein.
