= Glycine cleavage system =

Enzymes that break down glycine

Glycine cleavage H-protein
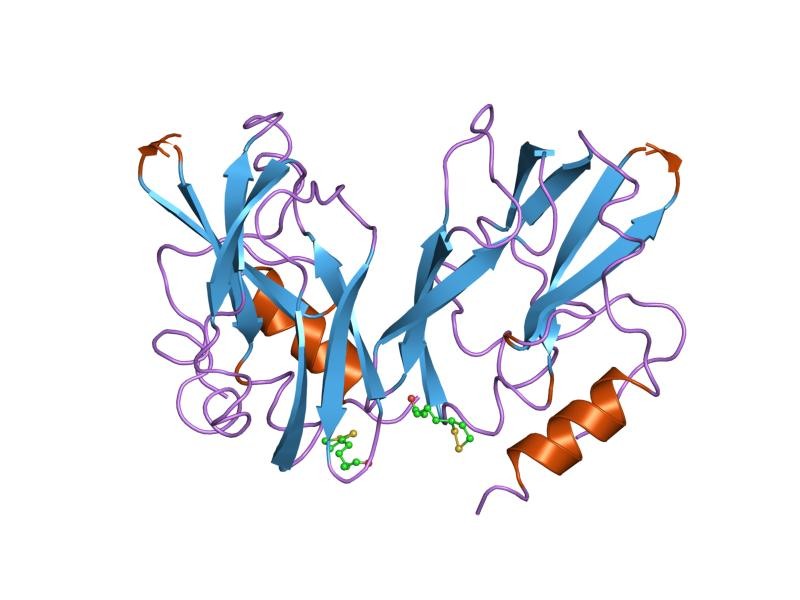
- refined structures at 2 angstroms and 2.2 angstroms of the two forms of the h-protein, a lipoamide-containing protein of the glycine decarboxylase

Identifiers
- Symbol: GCV_H
- Pfam: PF01597
- Pfam clan: CL0105
- InterPro: IPR002930
- SCOP2: 1htp / SCOPe / SUPFAM
Available protein structures:
- PDB: IPR002930 PF01597 (ECOD; PDBsum)
- AlphaFold: IPR002930; PF01597

Glycine cleavage T-protein, Aminomethyltransferase folate-binding domain
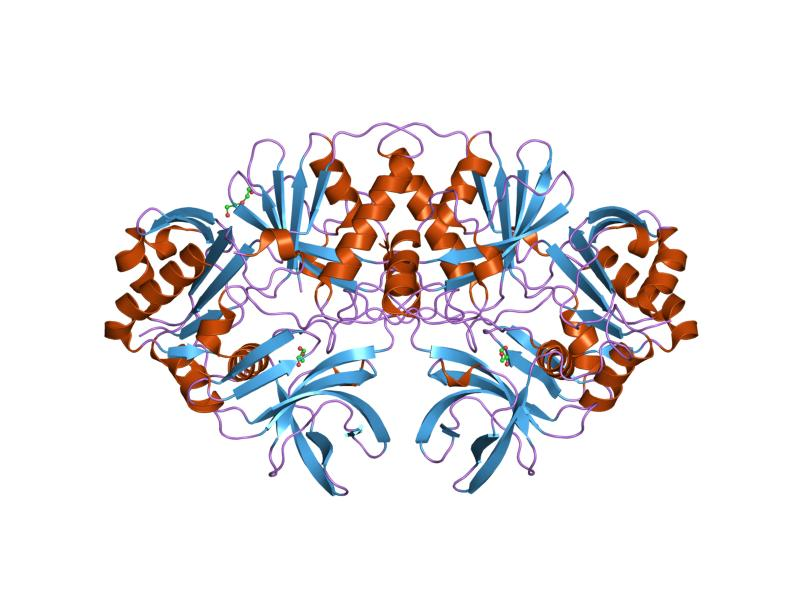
- crystal structure of a component of glycine cleavage system: t-protein from pyrococcus horikoshii ot3 at 1.5 a resolution

Identifiers
- Symbol: GCV_T
- Pfam: PF01571
- Pfam clan: CL0289
- InterPro: IPR006222
- SCOP2: 1pj5 / SCOPe / SUPFAM
Available protein structures:
- PDB: IPR006222 PF01571 (ECOD; PDBsum)
- AlphaFold: IPR006222; PF01571

Glycine cleavage T-protein C-terminal barrel domain
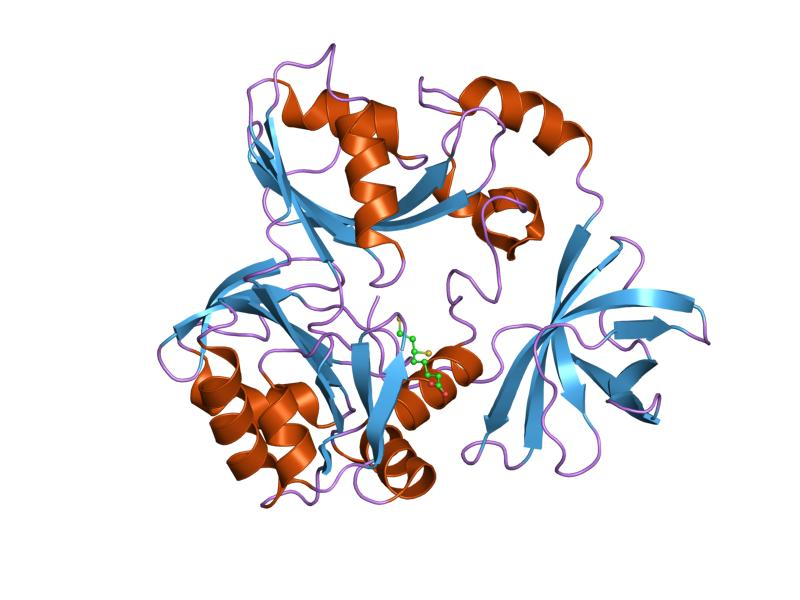
- crystal structure of t-protein of the glycine cleavage system

Identifiers
- Symbol: GCV_T_C
- Pfam: PF08669
- InterPro: IPR013977
- SCOP2: 1pj5 / SCOPe / SUPFAM
Available protein structures:
- PDB: IPR013977 PF08669 (ECOD; PDBsum)
- AlphaFold: IPR013977; PF08669

The glycine cleavage system (GCS) is also known as the glycine decarboxylase complex or GDC. The system is a series of enzymes that are triggered in response to high concentrations of the amino acid glycine. The same set of enzymes is sometimes referred to as glycine synthase when it runs in the reverse direction to form glycine. The glycine cleavage system is composed of four proteins: the T-protein, P-protein, L-protein, and H-protein. They do not form a stable complex, so it is more appropriate to call it a "system" instead of a "complex". The H-protein is responsible for interacting with the three other proteins and acts as a shuttle for some of the intermediate products in glycine decarboxylation. In both animals and plants, the glycine cleavage system is loosely attached to the inner membrane of the mitochondria. Mutations in this enzymatic system are linked with glycine encephalopathy.

== Components ==
Name	EC number	Function
P-protein (GLDC)	EC 1.4.4.2	glycine dehydrogenase (decarboxylating) or just glycine dehydrogenase (pyridoxal phosphate)
T-protein (GCST or AMT)	EC 2.1.2.10	aminomethyltransferase
H-protein (GCSH)		is modified with lipoic acid and interacts with all other components in a cycle of reductive methylamination (catalysed by the P-protein), methylamine transfer (catalysed by the T-protein) and electron transfer (catalysed by the L-protein).
L-protein (GCSL or DLD)	EC 1.8.1.4	known by many names, but most commonly dihydrolipoyl dehydrogenase

== Function ==
Glycine cleavage

In plants, animals and bacteria the glycine cleavage system catalyzes the following reversible reaction:

Glycine + H_{4}folate + NAD^{+} ↔ 5,10-methylene-H_{4}folate + CO_{2} + NH_{3} + NADH + H^{+}

In the enzymatic reaction, H-protein activates the P-protein, which catalyzes the decarboxylation of glycine and attaches the intermediate molecule to the H-protein to be shuttled to the T-protein. The H-protein forms a complex with the T-protein that uses tetrahydrofolate and yields ammonia and 5,10-methylenetetrahydrofolate. After interaction with the T-protein, the H-protein is left with two fully reduced thiol groups in the lipoate group. The glycine protein system is regenerated when the H-protein is oxidized to regenerate the disulfide bond in the active site by interaction with the L-protein, which reduces NAD^{+} to NADH and H^{+}.

When coupled to serine hydroxymethyltransferase, the glycine cleavage system overall reaction becomes:

2 glycine + NAD^{+} + H_{2}O → serine + CO_{2} + NH_{3} + NADH + H^{+}

In humans and most vertebrates, the glycine cleavage system is part of the most prominent glycine and serine catabolism pathway. This is due in large part to the formation 5,10-methylenetetrahydrofolate, which is one of the few C_{1} donors in biosynthesis. In this case the methyl group derived from the catabolism of glycine can be transferred to other key molecules such as purines and methionine.

Glycine and serine catabolism in and out of the mitochondria. Inside the mitochondria, the glycine cleavage systems links to the serine hydroxymethyltransferase in a reversible process allowing for flux control in the cell.

This reaction, and by extension the glycine cleavage system, is required for photorespiration in C_{3} plants. The glycine cleavage system takes glycine, which is created from an unwanted byproduct of the Calvin cycle, and converts it to serine which can reenter the cycle. The ammonia generated by the glycine cleavage system, is assimilated by the Glutamine synthetase-Glutamine oxoglutarate aminotransferase cycle but costs the cell one ATP and one NADPH. The upside is that one CO_{2} is produced for every two O_{2} that are mistakenly taken up by the cell, generating some value in an otherwise energy depleting cycle. Together the proteins involved in these reactions comprise about half the proteins in mitochondria from spinach and pea leaves. The glycine cleavage system is constantly present in the leaves of plants, but in small amounts until they are exposed to light. During peak photosynthesis, the concentration of the glycine cleavage system increases ten-fold.

In the anaerobic bacteria, Clostridium acidiurici, the glycine cleavage system runs mostly in the direction of glycine synthesis. While glycine synthesis through the cleavage system is possible due to the reversibility of the overall reaction, it is not readily seen in animals.

== Clinical significance ==
Glycine encephalopathy, also known as non-ketotic hyperglycinemia (NKH), is a primary disorder of the glycine cleavage system, resulting from lowered function of the glycine cleavage system causing increased levels of glycine in body fluids. The disease was first clinically linked to the glycine cleavage system in 1969. Early studies showed high levels of glycine in blood, urine and cerebrospinal fluid. Initial research using carbon labeling showed decreased levels of CO_{2} and serine production in the liver, pointing directly to deficiencies glycine cleavage reaction. Further research has shown that deletions and mutations in the 5' region of the P-protein are the major genetic causes of nonketotic hyperglycinemia. In more rare cases, a missense mutation in the genetic code of the T-protein, causing the histidine in position 42 to be mutated to arginine, was also found to result in nonketotic hypergycinemia. This specific mutation directly affected the active site of the T-protein, causing lowered efficiency of the glycine cleavage system.

== See also ==
- dihydrolipoamide dehydrogenase
- lipoic acid
- glycine encephalopathy
