= GCST =

GCST can stand for:

- New standard tuning
- "Glycine cleavage system T protein", another name for aminomethyltransferase
