= N-Acetylcysteine ethyl ester =

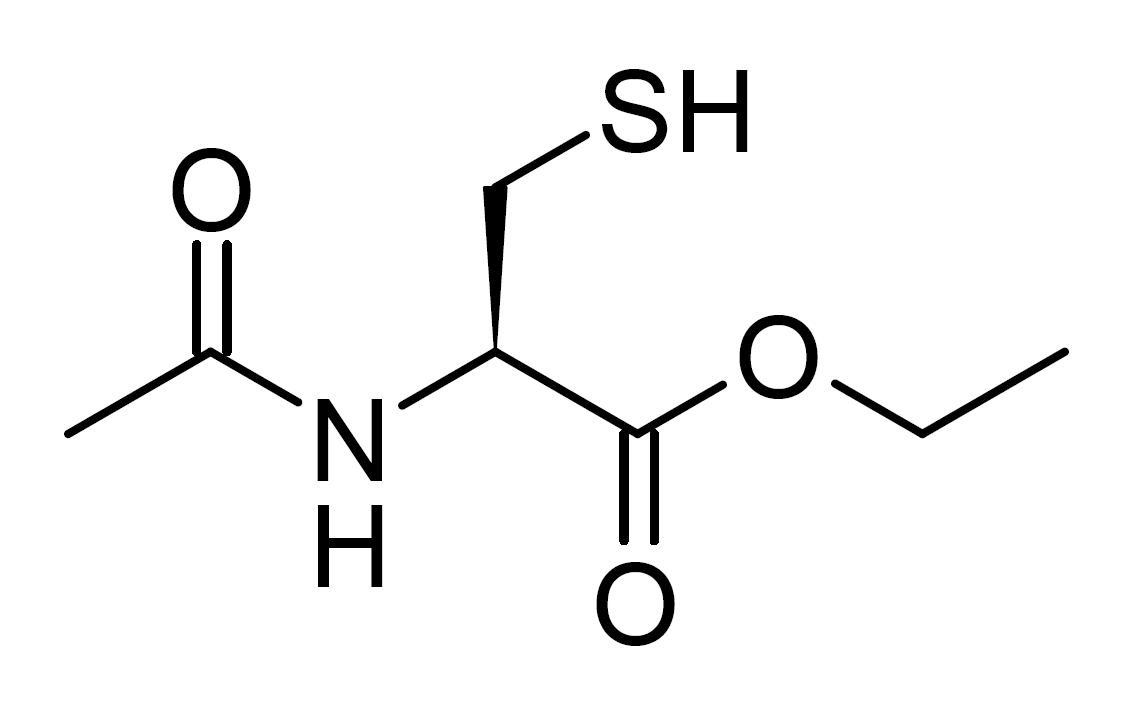

Clinical data
- Drug class: Antioxidant

Identifiers
- IUPAC name: ethyl (2R)-2-acetamido-3-sulfanylpropanoate
- CAS Number: 59587-09-6
- PubChem CID: 148861
- ChemSpider: 131213
- UNII: HT8ACS9ZPT
- ChEMBL: ChEMBL5435500
- CompTox Dashboard (EPA): DTXSID80208249

Chemical and physical data
- Formula: C_{7}H_{13}NO_{3}S
- Molar mass: 191.25 g·mol^{−1}
- 3D model (JSmol): Interactive image
- SMILES: CCOC(=O)[C@H](CS)NC(=O)C
- InChI: InChI=1S/C7H13NO3S/c1-3-11-7(10)6(4-12)8-5(2)9/h6,12H,3-4H2,1-2H3,(H,8,9)/t6-/m0/s1; Key:MSMRAGNKRYVTCX-LURJTMIESA-N

N-Acetylcysteine ethyl ester (NACET, NAC-Et) is an antioxidant which acts as a lipophilic prodrug for N-acetylcysteine and subsequently glutathione, with improved bioavailability over N-acetylcysteine itself, and has been researched in animal studies as a potential treatment for diabetic retinopathy. It has also been sold as a "dietary supplement" in combination with glycine under the name GlyNAC-Et as a supposedly improved version of the older glycine-NAC combination GlyNAC which has been claimed to show efficacy in counteracting symptoms associated with aging as well as HIV infection, diabetes and nerve damage. Several related compounds such as γ-glutamylcysteine ethyl ester and glutathione ethyl ester have been investigated for similar applications.

== See also ==
- Diallyl trisulfide
- Ergothioneine
- Lipoamide
- Lipoic acid
- Lipoic acid trisulfide
- Sulforaphane
