= LPLA =

LPLA may refer to:

- Lajes Field, an airfield in the Azores, ICAO airport code LPLA
- Lipoate–protein ligase, an enzyme
