= Streptomyces seoulensis =

Scientific classification
- Domain: Bacteria
- Kingdom: Bacillati
- Phylum: Actinomycetota
- Class: Actinomycetes
- Order: Streptomycetales
- Family: Streptomycetaceae
- Genus: Streptomyces
- Species: S. seoulensis

Binomial name
- Streptomyces seoulensis Chun et al. 1997

Type strain
- CIP 105312, DSM 41840, IFO 16255, IFO 16668, IMSNU 1, IMSNU 21266, JCM 10116, KCTC 9819, NBRC 16255, NBRC 16668, NRRL B-24310

Species of bacterium

Streptomyces seoulensis is a bacterium species from the genus of Streptomyces which has been isolated from soil from Korea. Streptomyces seoulensis produces lipoamide dehydrogenase.

== See also ==
- List of Streptomyces species
