= Hyperglycinemia =

Hyperglycinemia may refer to one of two related inborn amino acid disorders that are characterized by elevated levels of glycine in the blood.

- Propionic acidemia, also known as "ketotic glycinemia"
- Glycine encephalopathy, also known as "non-ketotic hyperglycinemia"
