= LIPB =

LIPB may refer to:

- Lipoyl(octanoyl) transferase, an enzyme
- Bolzano Airport
