= Dihydrolipoamide =

Names
- Preferred IUPAC name 6,8-Bis(sulfanyl)octanamide
- Other names 6,8-Dimercaptooctanamide

Identifiers
CAS Number	3884-47-7
3D model (JSmol)	Interactive image
ChEBI	CHEBI:17694
ChemSpider	643
KEGG	C00579
MeSH	dihydrolipoamide
PubChem CID	663
UNII	8RF8AN4JFL
CompTox Dashboard (EPA)	DTXSID90863287
- InChI: InChI=1S/C8H17NOS2/c9-8(10)4-2-1-3-7(12)5-6-11/h7,11-12H,1-6H2,(H2,9,10) Key: VLYUGYAKYZETRF-UHFFFAOYSA-N; InChI=1/C8H17NOS2/c9-8(10)4-2-1-3-7(12)5-6-11/h7,11-12H,1-6H2,(H2,9,10) Key: VLYUGYAKYZETRF-UHFFFAOYAF
- SMILES: O=C(N)CCCCC(S)CCS

Properties
Chemical formula	C_{8}H_{17}NOS_{2}
Molar mass	207.35 g·mol^{−1}
- Except where otherwise noted, data are given for materials in their standard state (at 25 °C [77 °F], 100 kPa). verify (what is ?) Infobox references

Dihydrolipoamide is a molecule oxidized by dihydrolipoyl dehydrogenase in order to produce lipoamide. Lipoamide is subsequently used as a cofactor for α-ketoglutarate dehydrogenase, the pyruvate dehydrogenase complex, and branched-chain α-ketoacid dehydrogenase complex.

== See also ==
- Dihydrolipoic acid
- Lipoic acid
