= SMVT =

SMVT may refer to:

- Sodium-dependent multivitamin transporter
- Sir M. Visvesvaraya Terminal, railway station in Bangalore, India
