= Glycine encephalopathy =

- Other names: Non-ketotic hyperglycinemia or NKH
- Structural formula of glycine
- Pronunciation: /ˈɡlaɪsin ˌɛnˈkɛfəlˈɒpəθi/
- Specialty: Medical genetics, metabolic medicine, neurology, pediatrics, nutrition
- Symptoms: Seizures, hypotonia, lethargy
- Complications: Intellectual disabilities, scoliosis, hip dysplasia
- Usual onset: Birth to early infancy
- Duration: Long-term
- Causes: Mutation in the GLDC or AMT gene and rarely the GCSH gene
- Risk factors: Family history (autosomal recessive inheritance)
- Diagnostic method: glycine levels, genetic testing
- Differential diagnosis: Organic acidurias, pyridoxine-dependent epilepsy, PNPO deficiency, PLPBP deficiency, disorders of intracellular cobalamin metabolism, lipoate deficiency, GLYT1 encephalopathy,
- Management: Sodium benzoate, NMDA receptor antagonists, anti-epileptic drugs, and ketogenic diet
- Medication: Dextromethorphan, ketamine
- Prognosis: Poor; reduced life-expectancy
- Frequency: 1 in 76,000 globally

Glycine encephalopathy (GE), also known as non-ketotic hyperglycinemia or simply NKH, is a rare, inherited, autosomal recessive disorder of glycine metabolism. The condition arises from defects in the glycine cleavage system, an essential enzyme complex for glycine breakdown. This results in toxic accumulation, particularly in the brain, causing seizures, lethargy, muscle weakness, respiratory problems, and a high risk of early mortality. The condition typically manifests within the first couple months of life presenting as progressive lethargy and muscle weakness that can quickly lead to respiratory failure. The diagnosis of GE or NKH is often suspected based on abnormally high levels of the amino acid, glycine, in bodily fluids and tissues, especially the cerebrospinal fluid. Severity of symptoms and outcomes correlate with age at onset, with those presenting symptoms in the first few days having worse outcomes than those in the first few weeks to months. Among individuals that survive, they often have mild to severe intellectual disabilities, motor difficulties, and intractable seizures. Some individuals develop cortical blindness, scoliosis, and hip dysplasia.

NKH is primarily caused by mutations in the GLDC gene and, less frequently the AMT gene. These mutations result in defective P-protein and T-protein subunits of the glycine cleavage system, which are key components of glycine metabolism in mitochondria. Excess glycine results in disrupted glycine signaling in the brain especially NMDA receptors. Additionally, without glycine metabolism the body and brain are depleted of glycine-derived one carbon donors which are important for early brain development.

There is currently no cure for NKH; treatment focuses on reducing plasma glycine levels and symptom management. Sodium benzoate is used to reduce plasma glycine levels and NMDA receptor antagonists, like dextromethorphan or ketamine, are used to decrease NMDA receptor stimulation which can improve seizures, though many individuals require multiple anti-seizure drugs. Ongoing research continues to explore replacing the faulty gene through gene therapy, evaluating alternative glycine lowering agents especially that may do so in the brain, and providing alternative one carbon units including both dietary interventions and drugs. NKH is a life-limiting disorder and while life-expectancy is reduced advancements in care and treatment have improved outcomes for those with the disorder, especially the attenuated form.

NKH is an ultra-rare disease with an estimated 1 in every 76,000 globally or around 500 people worldwide. After phenylketonuria, glycine encephalopathy is the second most common disorder of amino acid metabolism. NKH was first described in 1965 and referred to as 'a new type of idiopathic hyperglycinemia' and later 'non-ketotic hyperglycinemia', a reference to the biochemical findings seen in patients with the disorder, and to distinguish it from the disorders that cause "ketotic hyperglycinemia" (as seen in propionic acidemia and several other inherited metabolic disorders). To avoid confusion, the term "glycine encephalopathy" is sometimes used, to better describe the clinical underpinnings of the disorder.

== Signs and symptoms ==
The first signs and symptoms usually appear in the neonatal period (first hours or days of life) and to a lesser extent the infantile period (2 weeks to 3 months). For onset in the neonatal period, the hallmark sign is progressive lethargy often leading to coma and marked muscle weakness (hypotonia). If artificial ventilation is not provided, death often occurs. Most later regain spontaneous respiration and see improvement in alertness in the first month of life including oral feeding (bottle drinking). Additionally, pronounced hiccups or myoclonic jerks may be present, which are often a sign of epilepsy. If onset occurs in the infantile period, the primary symptom is prolonged hypotonia combined with developmental delays and seizures. Although late presentation (beyond 3 months) is possible, it is uncommon and typically features a more subtle presentation of symptoms, such as developmental delays and mild seizures. Infants with this presentation have frequently been associated with the attenuated form of the disease.

In infants who survive and are managed with sodium benzoate, a range of symptoms may manifest, dependent upon the severity of the disease. The most prominent symptom is seizures which are present in a majority of cases. Other common symptoms include continued hypotonia and lethargy. In the attenuated forms, these symptoms are often milder than the severe form. Seizures are readily controlled and individuals can learn to walk, reach, grasp, and may learn to speak or use sign language. Lethargy is often occasional and linked to infections. Additionally, hyperactivity is common and often severe and treatment resistant. In the severe form, however, seizures are difficult to treat and may become progressively worse. Children do not learn to sit or grasp and often have limited ability to interact with their environment. They also often develop cortical blindness, scoliosis, and hip dysplasia. There is typically no hyperactivity, but spasticity is common. Some have cleft palate or clubfeet and secondary microencephaly has also been noted.

== Causes ==
Glycine Encephalopathy (Non-ketotic Hyperglycinemia) has an autosomal-recessive pattern of inheritance.

NKH results from a non-working glycine cleavage system, typically due to mutations in genes that encode the P or T-protein and sometimes the H-protein.

Glycine encephalopathy is an autosomal-recessive disorder caused by a defect in the glycine cleavage system (GCS). In an autosomal recessive inheritance pattern, two defective copies of the gene (one inherited from each parent) are required for a child to be born with the disorder. Individuals with only one copy of the defective gene are considered carriers for the disorder and do not show signs or symptoms of the disorder.

The GCS is a large enzyme complex made up of four protein subunits, each of these four subunits is encoded by a separate gene. Defects in three of these four genes have been linked to glycine encephalopathy, which include GLDC (chromosome 9), AMT (chromosome 3), and GCSH (chromosome 16). There is a fourth subunit in the GCS, Dihydrolipoamide dehydrogenase or L-protein, encoded by the DLD gene (chromosome 7). However, defects in the L-protein are associated with a distinct disorder known as Dihydrolipoamide Dehydrogenase Deficiency, likely owing to its roles in multiple enzymes complexes beside the GCS.

Gene	Protein Name	Percent
GLDC	Encodes for the P-protein or glycine dehydrogenase subunit, also called glycine decarboxylase of the glycine cleavage system.	About 80% of cases of glycine encephalopathy result from mutations in the GLDC gene.
GCST or AMT	Encodes for the T-protein or the aminomethyltransferase subunit of the glycine cleavage system.	About 20% of cases are caused by mutations in the AMT gene.
GCSH	Encodes for the H-protein subunit of the glycine cleavage system.	Mutations in the GCSH gene account for less than 1% of cases.

=== Variant NKH ===
A small subset of affected individuals do not have detectable mutations in any of the three genes (listed above) that are typically associated with the disease. However, they still show impaired glycine metabolism and toxic accumulation. This is called variant NKH, where individuals often have mutations in the genes encoding one of the cofactors associated with the GCS complex. These cases are often linked to lipoate deficiency disorder, commonly associated with mutations in the LIAS, BOLA3, and GLRX5 genes, as well as pyridoxal phosphate deficiency disorder, which is associated with the ALDH7A1 gene. Sometimes this is referred to as atypical NKH.

== Pathophysiology ==
Defects in the subunits of the GCS typically cause glycine encephalopathy, although some causes of the disease are due to defects in cofactors of the GCS. While the GCS shows its highest enzymatic activity in kidney, liver, and brain it is considered that the buildup of glycine in the brain is responsible for the majority of symptoms. Individuals with NKH have a thin and shortened corpus callosum and atropy is often present in older individuals with severe, but not attenuated NKH. Some develop hydrocephalus.

Glycine is the simplest amino acid, having no stereoisomers. In the cortical neuroepithelium, glycine levels double during embryogenesis, peak at birth, and then gradually decline to approximately 60% within the first two weeks after birth, a period during which the GSC enzyme is expressed at high levels. Glycine plays an important role in central nervous system development.

In adulthood, glycine acts primarily as an inhibitory neurotransmitter in the spinal cord, brain stem, and retina and is associated with motor control, respiration, pain signals, vision, and hearing. It also modulates excitation by co-agonizing NMDA receptors which regulate neuronal excitability and are important for brain development and learning and memory.

=== Glycine and NMDA receptor overactivation ===
Elevated glycine levels cause overactivation of NMDA receptors through excessive stimulation at the glycinergic binding site, resulting in excitotoxicity. This process contributes to neuronal and axonal injury, manifesting as encephalopathy, seizures, and other neurological features. Overstimulation of inhibitory glycine receptors in the brainstem and spinal cord further contributes to symptoms such as hypotonia, apnea, and hiccups. Outside the brain glycine receptors are found in the retina, liver, kidney, and immune cells.

=== Glycine and one-carbon metabolism ===
Glycine is metabolized in the body's cells to end products of carbon dioxide and ammonia via the glycine cleavage system, in the mitochondria This multi-enzyme complex not only catabolizes glycine but also transfers a one-carbon unit to tetrahydrofolate, generating 5,10-methylenetetrahydrofolate. This intermediate supports one-carbon metabolism, which is essential for processes such as purine synthesis, thymidylate production, and methionine regeneration. Deficient glycine cleavage activity impairs the supply of one-carbon units, potentially contributing to disrupted folate-dependent pathways and associated developmental impacts.

== Diagnosis ==
Newborns and infants, typically within the first three months of life, commonly present with a combination of several symptoms upon physical examination. These can include low muscle tone (hypotonia), decreased alertness (lethargy), breathing difficulties (apnea), seizures, poor feeding, and developmental delays of unknown etiology. Confirmation of a diagnosis requires laboratory tests and/or brain imaging evaluations.

Elevated levels of glycine in both plasma and cerebrospinal fluid (CSF), particularly a high CSF-to-plasma glycine ratio, are strong indicators of Non-Ketotic Hyperglycinemia (NKH). Additionally, a ¹³C-glycine breath test may demonstrate reduced exhalation of carbon dioxide in affected individuals. Genetic testing revealing a pathogenic variant in the glycine cleavage system (GCS) serves as definitive confirmation of NKH. Magnetic resonance imaging (MRI) and magnetic resonance spectroscopy (MRS) can also assist in the diagnosis by identifying specific brain abnormalities and assessing brain glycine signals, respectively.

=== Differential Diagnosis ===
Other inherited metabolic conditions that may mimic the clinical presentation of NKH include:

- Organic acidurias
- Pyridoxine-dependent epilepsy
- Pyridox(am)ine 5'-Phosphate Oxidase deficiency (PNPO) deficiency
- Pyridoxal 5'-Phosphate-Binding Protein Deficiency (PLPBP) deficiency
- Disorders of intracellular cobalamin metabolism
- Lipoate deficiency
- GLYT1 encephalopathy

Severe liver failure can lead to hyperglycinemia, while the administration of glycine-containing fluids may impair diagnostic testing for NKH. Certain medications, such as valproate, are also known to decrease the activity of the GCS. Additionally, transient neonatal hyperglycinemia has been reported in a limited number of cases as a consequence of intracerebral hemorrhage, hypoxic-ischemic injury, or low activity of the glycine cleavage system in the immature brain and liver of the neonate.

=== Classification ===
NKH classification is determined by the ultimate clinical presentation and outcomes and delineated in the following table.

Clinical classification of glycine encephalopathy (non-ketotic hyperglycinemia)
Feature	Severe NKH	Attenuated NKH – Poor outcome	Attenuated NKH – Intermediate outcome	Attenuated NKH – Good outcome
Outcome definition	No developmental progress; intractable epilepsy	Limited development; epilepsy present	Moderate development; treatable or absent epilepsy	Better development; easily controlled or no epilepsy
Developmental quotient (DQ)	Typically <20	<20	20–50	>50
Epilepsy	Intractable, treatment-resistant	Present, often difficult to control	Treatable or absent	Absent or easily controlled
Developmental milestones	Rarely achieved	Severely limited or absent	Some milestones achieved	Most milestones achieved
Typical age at onset	Neonatal period	Neonatal or infantile	Neonatal, infantile, or later onset	Later infancy
Glycine levels and CSF:plasma ratio	Markedly elevated; higher CSF:plasma ratios	Intermediate elevations	Lower than severe NKH; overlap with attenuated range	Lower end of attenuated range
Prognosis	Poor; often life-limiting	Poor to moderate	Moderate	Best prognosis among NKH forms
Notes	Represents classic neonatal NKH	Overlaps clinically with severe NKH	Often characterized by treatable seizures and functional gains	Mild delays with improved functional outcomes

== Management ==
Stylized depiction of an activated NMDAR. Glutamate is in the glutamate-binding site and glycine is in the glycine-binding site. Dextromethorphan and ketamine inhibit NMDARs by blocking the open channel.

There is no cure for NKH and no treatments that alter the natural history of the disease. The food and cosmetic preservative sodium benzoate, is used to manage symptoms primarily by normalizing plasma glycine levels. This occurs through a two-step reaction. Sodium benzoate breaks down into benzoic acid in the body which is converted to benzoyl-CoA via benzoyl-CoA synthetase in the mitochondria of the liver and kidneys. Benzoyl-CoA then combines with glycine via the enzyme glycine N-acyltransferase to form hippuric acid (hippurate) which is excreted through the urine. Sodium benzoate has a limited effect on brain glycine levels and cannot normalize cerebrospinal fluid glycine levels. In the United States, sodium benzoate is not approved by the Food and Drug Administration as a stand-alone treatment for this condition or others.

NMDA receptor antagonists, including dextromethorphan or ketamine, function by inhibiting the N-methyl-D-aspartate receptors for which glycine serves as a co-agonist and thus may be over stimulated in NKH. These therapies primarily aid with seizure control and may improve neurodevelopmental outcomes in some individuals. Many patients often need three to four anti-seizure medications for adequate control.

The ketogenic diet is frequently employed alongside the previously mentioned therapies. As a therapeutic diet, it is known to effectively address difficult-to-control seizures in children. Furthermore, this diet enables patients to reduce their sodium benzoate dosage, likely owing to its promotion of gluconeogenesis, which utilizes glycine and other glucogenic amino acids to generate glucose.

=== Contraindications ===
The anti-seizure medications valproate and vigabratin are contraindicated in NKH. Valproate raises blood and CSF glycine levels and can paradoxically increase seizure frequency in those with NKH. Vigabratin has noted to induce rapid deterioration in some individuals.

== Prognosis ==
The prognosis is very poor. Two studies reported typical age of death in infancy or early childhood, with the first reporting a median age of death of 2.6 for boys and less than 1 month for girls. However, isolated cases of survival into the fifth decade of life have been reported.

== Epidemiology ==
NKH is a rare disease and ultimately ultra-rare disease with an estimated incidence of 1 in 76,000 globally. The highest known incidence is potentially Finland at 1 in 12,000.

== History ==
The physician Barton Childs and his team published the first case of what they called 'ketotic hyperglycinemia' in 1961. Their patient displayed elevated levels of ketones and glycine and was the first description of what is now known more accurately as propionic acidemia. In 1965, four years later, Gerritsen and colleagues described 'a new type of idiopathic hyperglycinemia' of elevated glycine levels without elevated ketones becoming the first description of 'non-ketotic hyperglycinemia'.

== Society and culture ==
NKH is a rare disease, but maintains a very active global community presence from educating parents with newly diagnosed children to fundraising for treatments. Organizations and groups in this space include the following in alphabetical order: Brodyn's Friends, Drake Rayden Foundation, Jack Richard Urban Foundation, John Thomas NKH Foundation, Joseph's Goal, Les Petits Bourdons, Lucas John Foundation, Maud & Vic Foundation, Nora Jane Foundation, NKH Crusaders, NKH Network, The Foundation of Nonketotic Hyperglycinemia, The Mikaere Foundation.

Additionally, nkh.org is a health information website about NKH established by The Mikaere Foundation for parents, carers and medical professionals who support patients with NKH. It is accredited by the Patient Information Forum’s Trusted Information Creator programme, reviewed for accuracy by metabolic doctors and NKH specialists, and fully referenced with cited sources.

== Research ==
=== Gene Therapy ===
Gene therapy seeks to replace the defective gene responsible for the glycine cleavage system with a functional copy. Current research has predominantly utilized AAV9, an adenoviral vector capable of penetrating the brain, to deliver a working copy of the GLDC gene in neonatal mice. These studies have shown a reduction in both plasma and brain glycine levels, along with a normalization of the folate profile, indicating a restoration of the glycine-derived one-carbon supply.

As of now, there are no approved systemically delivered gene therapies that exist to treat disorders primarily affecting the brain. However, onasemnogene abeparvovec has been approved for spinal muscular atrophy, a condition affecting the spinal cord and certain brain regions. AAV9's ability to cross the blood-brain barrier is present at any age, but maximal efficacy is observed in neonates.

=== Glycine Lowering Agents ===
Early research combined sodium benzoate with acetylsalicylic acid (commonly known as aspirin). Salicylic acid and glycine combine to form salicyluric acid primarily in the kidneys and is the main way salicylates are excreted. No research has thoroughly investigated its usage in NKH. Other research has investigated sodium cinnamate as an alternative glycine lowering therapy and shown similar effectiveness as sodium benzoate. Sodium benzoate is a metabolite of cinnamon and likely works to lower glycine in a similar fashion. No therapeutic research strategies have focused on lowering brain glycine levels.

=== Glycine Antagonists ===
The glycine receptor is one the most common inhibitory receptors in the brain and plays key roles in motor control, pain, respiration, and brain development. Research in the late 1970s to mid-1990s explored using strychnine, a glycine receptor antagonist, to treat NKH with no benefit. Strychnine is highly toxic and no longer used in medicine.

Intractable seizures in NKH are thought to arise from overstimulation of NMDA receptors by glycine, which functions as a co-agonist of the receptor. While NMDA receptor antagonists like dextromethorphan and ketamine have shown to be helpful in some patients they do not function by preventing glycine binding of the receptor. Several drugs that prevent glycine binding on the NMDA receptor have been developed, such as L-4-chlorokynurenine, Gavestinel, and Licostinel, but have not been tested in NKH.

=== One Carbon Supply ===
Metabolism of glycine is the second major provider of one carbon carrying folates after serine, which as secondary consequence is also depleted in NKH. This has been large area for research. Decreased one carbon supply has shown to be associated with neural tube defects, prenatal aqueduct stenosis and subsequent hydrocephalus in GLDC mutant mice which can be prevented by supplementation of formate, an alternative amino acid independent source of one carbon donors. Moreover, a study in 1974 showed that sodium formate was able to reduce glycine levels, but not normalize them in an individual with NKH.

Other research has focused on increasing amino acids such as methionine and tryptophan that can also provide one carbon units, albeit less than serine and glycine. Dietary intervention, however, by increasing methionine or tryptophan has shown limited effect.

=== Patient Registries ===
Response to treatment is variable and the long-term and functional outcomes of both the disorder and its management remain largely unstudied. To provide a basis for improving the understanding of the epidemiology, genotype/phenotype correlation, outcomes of the disorder, and their impact on the quality of life of patients a patient registry was established by the noncommercial International Working Group on Neurotransmitter Related Disorders (iNTD). Additionally, a patient registry was established with the Coordination of Rare Diseases at Sanford (CoRDS) and overseen by the patient advocacy organization NKH Crusaders

== See also ==
- List of amino acid metabolism disorders
- inborn errors of metabolism
- GLYT1 encephalopathy
