= GLYT1 encephalopathy =

- Other names: Glycine encephalopathy with normal serum glycine.
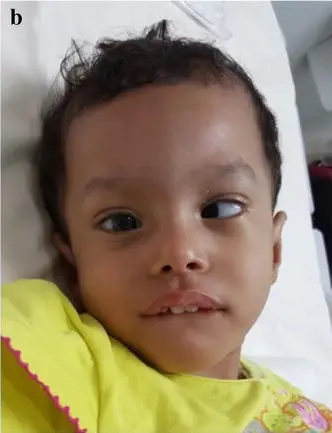
- Photo of person with GLyT1 Encephalopathy, with decreased size of head, inward turning cross eye, receding lower jaw, deep prominent philtrum, thin eyebrows.
- Specialty: Medical genetics, Neurology
- Usual onset: In infancy
- Differential diagnosis: Glycine encephalopathy
- Treatment: Supportive

GLYT1 encephalopathy is a rare autosmal recessive, metabolic and genetic disorder which is caused by a mutation in the SLC6A9 gene.

The main features of this disorder are: severely diminished muscle tone, respiratory failure, absence of neonatal reflexes, encephalopathy, reduced consciousness and unresponsiveness, also it can present with arthrogryposis/ligament laxity, and normal serum glycine.

About 10 cases had been reported as of 2022.

== Symptoms ==
Someone with GLYT1 encephalopathy can present with facial dysmorphism, arthrogryposis and diminished muscle tone that progresses into muscle hypertonicity with so called startle-like clonus (which means that they have startle-like response to vocal and visual stimuli) and normal serum glycine level.

Facial features of this disorder might include: thin eyebrows, saddle nose, retrognathism, long myopathic face, piggy noses, tent-shaped mouth, low-set ears.

== Diagnosis ==
Diagnosis of this disorder can be suspected by symptoms (such as: drowsiness, diminished muscle tone, and seizures) and by high glycine levels in cerebrospinal fluid and normal levels of enzymes and glycine in plasma, consequently diagnosis can be confirmed by genetic testing of GLYT1.

== Cause ==
This disorder is caused by a mutation in a gene SLC6A9, which encodes Sodium- and chloride-dependent glycine transporter 1 protein, which is located on chromosome 1.

== Pathophysiology ==
Glycine is the simplest amino acid, that doesn't have any stereoisomers. Glycine participates in protein synthesis, but it can act as neurotransmitter, in the spinal cord and in the brain stem, it acts as inhibitory neurotransmitter by activating glycine channels. Although it has excitatory effect in neocortex (by co-activating NMDAR).

GLYT1 protein is located on astrocytes that are next to glycinergic neurons to clear glycine swiftly from the synaptic cleft. Consequently, this mechanism is disrupted in this disease by hyperactivating NMDA receptors and glycine receptors.

== Treatment ==
GLYT1 encephalopathy doesn't have a cure and its management is supportive, and it requires a multidisciplinary team (that may consist of geneticists, paediatricians, physiotherapists, etc.) to control symptoms. One patient was treated sodium benzoate and ketamine, but it didn't show any results.

== Prognosis ==
This disorder is usually fatal in infancy. Only 2 patients survived till childhood (at the time of the article's publication).

== History ==
This disorder was first reported by Alfadhel and colleagues in 2016.

== See also ==
- Glycine encephalopathy
