= Lipoyl synthase =

Enzyme involved in lipoic acid metabolism

Identifiers
- EC no.: 2.8.1.8
- CAS no.: 189398-80-9

Databases
- BRENDA: enzyme data
- ExPASy: NiceZyme view
- KEGG: enzyme entry
- MetaCyc: metabolic pathway
- Rhea: reactions
- PDB structures: RCSB PDB PDBe PDBsum
- Gene Ontology: AmiGO / QuickGO
Search
- PMC: articles
- PubMed: articles
- NCBI: proteins

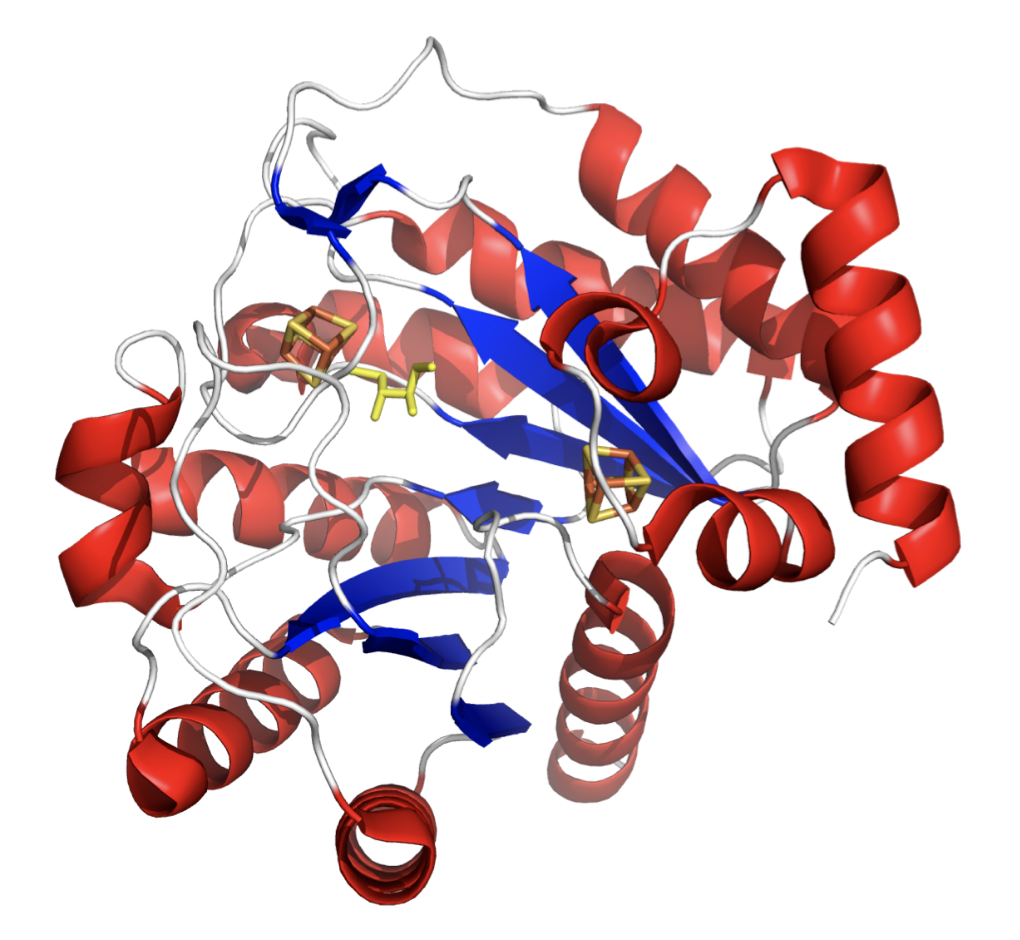
This image displays the crystal structure of M. tuberculosis lipoyl synthase. The 11 α-helices are displayed in red and the 7 β sheets are displayed in blue. The DTV cofactor is displayed in yellow. The two [4Fe-4S] clusters are displayed as cubic structures within the enzyme. PBD Code: 5EXI

Lipoyl synthase is an enzyme that belongs to the radical SAM (S-adenosyl methionine) family. Within the radical SAM superfamily, lipoyl synthase is in a sub-family of enzymes that catalyze sulfur insertion reactions. The enzymes in this subfamily differ from general radical SAM enzymes, as they contain two 4Fe-4S clusters. From these clusters, the enzymes obtain the sulfur groups that will be transferred onto the corresponding substrates. This particular enzyme participates in the final step of lipoic acid metabolism, transferring two sulfur atoms from its 4Fe-4S cluster onto the protein N_{6}-(octanoyl)lysine through radical generation. This enzyme is usually localized to the mitochondria. Two organisms that have been extensively studied with regards to this enzyme are Escherichia coli and Mycobacterium tuberculosis. It is currently being studied in other organisms including yeast, plants, and humans.

== Nomenclature ==
The systematic name of this enzyme class is protein N6-(octanoyl)lysine:sulfur sulfurtransferase. Other names in common use include:

- LS
- LipA
- lipoate synthase
- protein 6-N-(octanoyl)lysine:sulfur sulfurtransferase.

== Structure ==
The sequence length of M. tuberculosis lipoyl synthase is approximately 331 amino acids. The structure is composed of 11 α-helices and 7 β sheets, with multiple loop structures connecting the other components. The two [4Fe-4S] clusters are located within the structure, appearing in three-dimensional cubic shape. A molecule of DTV ((2S,3S)-1,4-Dimercaptobutane-2,3-diol), more commonly known as DTT (dithiothreitol), is also present within the structure. This molecule is responsible for protecting thiol groups from oxidation. The molecule is surrounded by water molecules as well, which form hydrogen bonds with side residues to stabilize the structure. The enzyme's structure is shown.

== Mechanism of lipoyl synthase ==
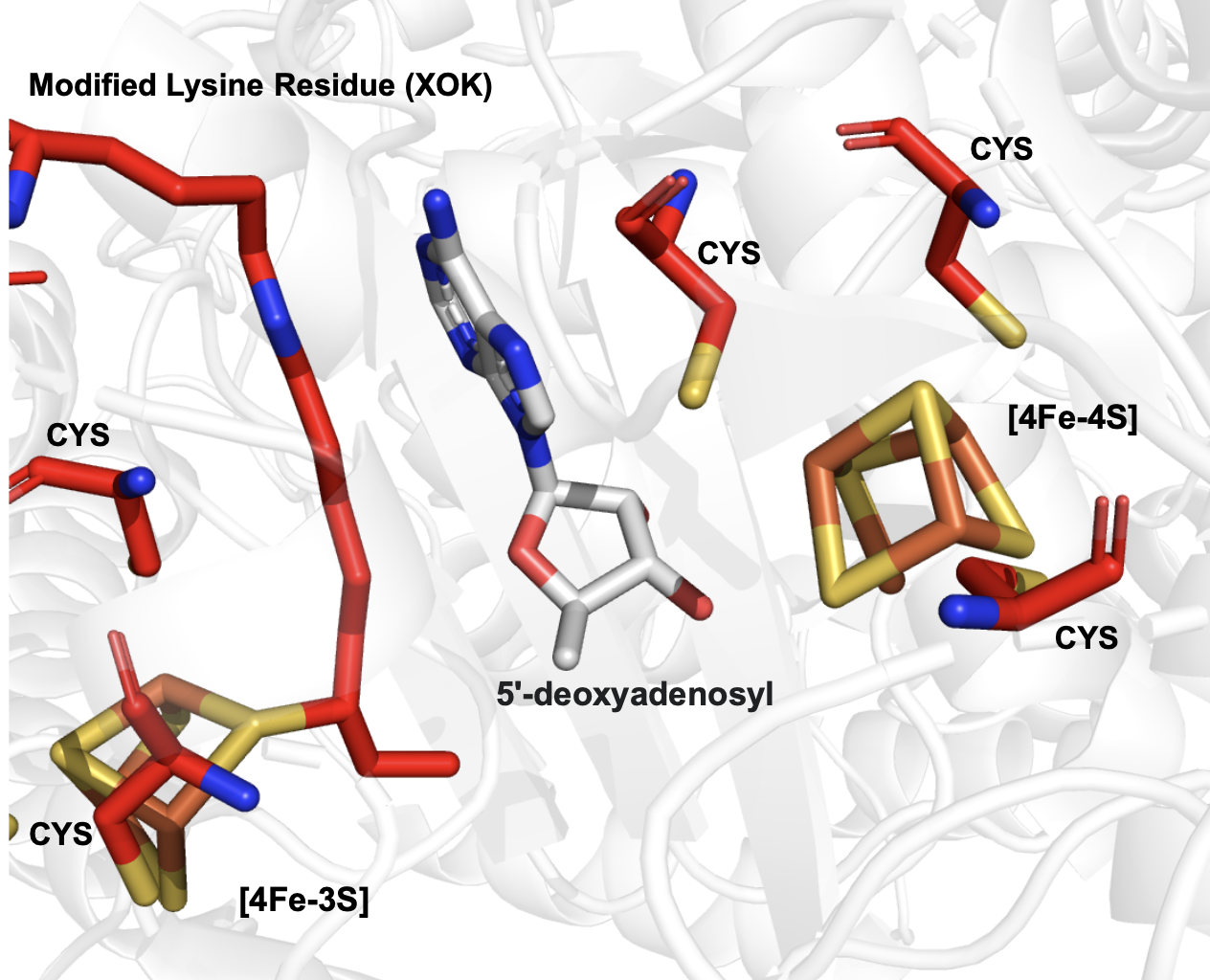
This image displays the auxillery [4Fe-4S] cluster adding a sulfur onto a lysine residue that is part of the protein. This causes the cluster to become [4Fe-3S] and the modified lysine is formed (labeled XOK). The 5'-deoxyadenosine is also pictured, along with the coordinate cysteine residues . PBD Code: 5EXK

As previously mentioned, lipoyl synthase is a member of a subfamily of the radical SAM(S-adenosyl methionine) enzyme family, which use a [4Fe-4S] cluster cofactor. This cofactor is used by this enzyme to produce 5'-deoxyadenosyl 5'-radical (5'-dA). Lipoyl synthase itself uses this radical to abstract hydrogens from the 6th and 8th carbons of the protein N_{6}(octanoyl)lysine substrate. Two sulfurs from one of lipoyl synthase's two [4Fe-4S] clusters, known as the auxiliary cluster, are then attached to the 6th and 8th carbons in place of the abstracted hydrogens.The protein N6-(octanoyl)lysine substrate is then converted into the protein N_{6}-(lipoyl)lysine. The figure on the right depicts the lysine interacting with the auxiliary cluster to add one sulfur, which then becomes an [4Fe-3S] cluster. The other [4Fe-4S] cluster is coordinated by the radical SAM motif of the enzyme (CxxxCxxC) and participates in radical SAM characteristic chemistry to activate the substrate for subsequent sulfur insertion. The three substrates of this enzyme are N6-(octanoyl)lysine, sulfur, and S-adenosyl-L-methionine. The three products are N6-(lipoyl)lysine, L-methionine, and 5'-deoxyadenosine. Below displays the overall reaction catalyzed by lipoyl synthase, with the structures of each substrate and product.

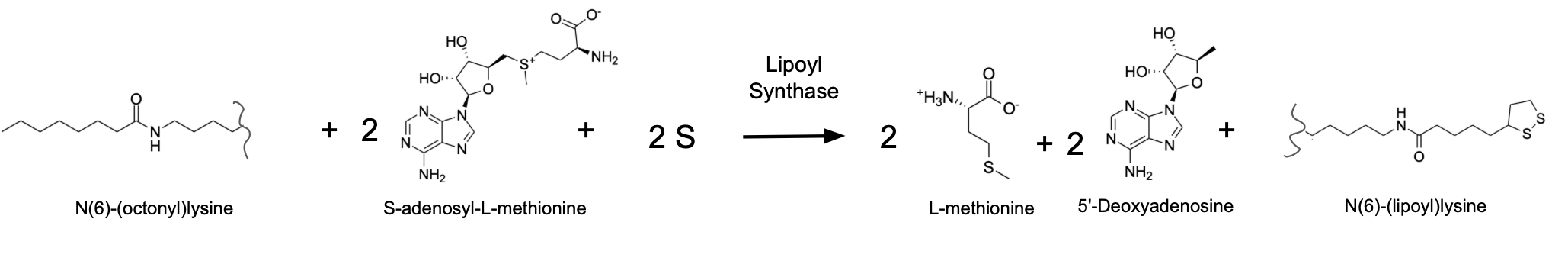
This image depicts the enzyme catalyzed reaction involving lipoyl synthase. The lysine is a residue a part of the polypeptide backbone of the protein. The sulfur molecules comes from the [4Fe-4S] auxiliary cluster.

== Importance of lipoyl synthase ==
This enzyme participates in lipoic acid metabolism, where it performs the final step in lipoic acid biosynthesis. Lipoic acid is a cofactor that has different functions within different organisms. The lipoic acid generation in yeast cells increases the number of divisions in the cells as well as protects yeast cells from hydrogen peroxide. Lipoic acid is an important co-factor in many enzyme systems, and one of them is the pyruvate dehydrogenase complex. Studies that repressed the function of lipoyl synthase in Arabidopsis thaliana seeds showed that this did not have adverse effects on seed growth and weight, but shortened the generation time as well as the flowering time of the plants. Repression resulted in earlier flowering times and decreased the generation times between seeds by almost 10%.

== Possible side effects of lipoyl synthase in plants ==
Overexpression of this enzyme in sunflower plants has been found to eventually sequester the amount of SAM present in transgenic Arabidopsis plants. SAM is a molecule that is required in other enzymatic complexes found in this plant as well, as well as the overall structure of the plant, so this sequestration may cause a reduction in the fatty acid biosynthesis in the Arabidopsis seeds.
