= Lipoic acid trisulfide =

Names
- Preferred IUPAC name 5-(trithian-4-yl)pentanoic acid
- Other names 1,2,3-trithiane-4-pentanoic acid

Identifiers
CAS Number	1204245-29-3
3D model (JSmol)	Interactive image
ChemSpider	13401696
PubChem CID	18417507
UNII	UQ303H498S
- InChI: InChI=1S/C8H14O2S3/c9-8(10)4-2-1-3-7-5-6-11-13-12-7/h7H,1-6H2,(H,9,10) Key: NBMATVIMURBZTQ-UHFFFAOYSA-N
- SMILES: OC(=O)CCCCC1CCSSS1

Properties
Chemical formula	C_{8}H_{14}O_{2}S_{3}
Molar mass	238.38 g·mol^{−1}
- Except where otherwise noted, data are given for materials in their standard state (at 25 °C [77 °F], 100 kPa). Infobox references

Lipoic acid trisulfide (LATS, LASSS) is an organic compound derived from lipoic acid. It has an additional sulfur atom in its ring, so instead of a 5 membered 1,2-dithiolane ring it has a 6 membered 1,2,3-trithiane ring. It has antioxidant effects and acts as a delayed release source of hydrogen sulfide, which makes it of potential medical interest. It has been sold as a dietary supplement.

== See also ==
- Diallyl trisulfide
- Dihydrolipoic acid
- Ergothioneine
- Glutathione
- Lipoamide
- N-Acetylcysteine ethyl ester
- Sulforaphane
