= Lipoyl amidotransferase =

Identifiers
- EC no.: 2.3.1.200

Databases
- IntEnz: IntEnz view
- BRENDA: BRENDA entry
- ExPASy: NiceZyme view
- KEGG: KEGG entry
- MetaCyc: metabolic pathway
- PRIAM: profile
- PDB structures: RCSB PDB PDBe PDBsum
Search
- PMC: articles
- PubMed: articles
- NCBI: proteins

Lipoyl amidotransferase (EC 2.3.1.200, LipL (gene)) is an enzyme with systematic name (glycine cleavage system H)-N^{6}-lipoyl-L-lysine:(lipoyl-carrier protein)-N^{6}-L-lysine lipoyltransferase. This enzyme catalyses the following chemical reaction

[glycine cleavage system H]-N^{6}-lipoyl-L-lysine + [lipoyl-carrier protein] $\rightleftharpoons$ glycine cleavage system H + [lipoyl-carrier protein]-N^{6}-lipoyl-L-lysine

In the bacterium Listeria monocytogenes the enzyme takes part in a pathway for scavenging of lipoic acid.
