= Dihydrolipoic acid =

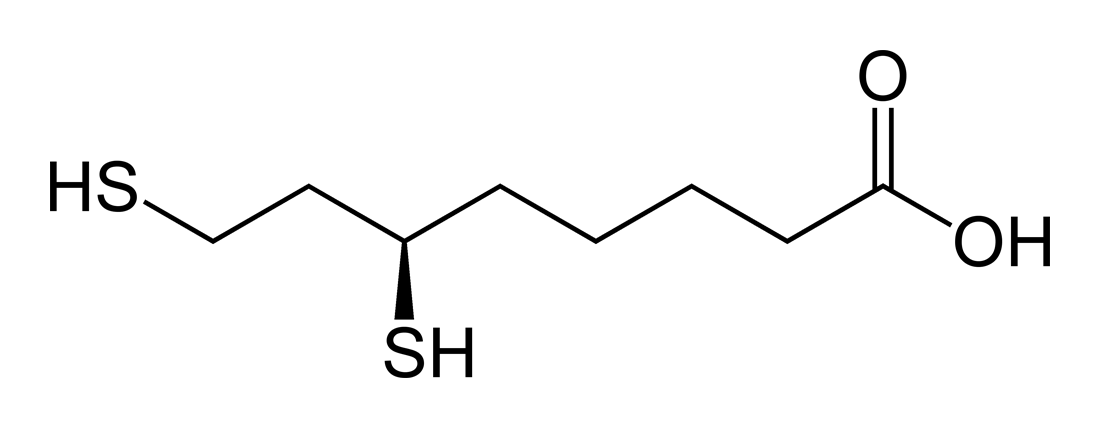

Names
- Preferred IUPAC name 6,8-Bis(sulfanyl)octanoic acid
- Other names 6,8-Dimercaptooctanoic acid Reduced lipoic acid

Identifiers
CAS Number	462-20-4
3D model (JSmol)	Interactive image
ChEBI	CHEBI:18047
ChEMBL	ChEMBL225952
ChemSpider	408
ECHA InfoCard	100.120.390
IUPHAR/BPS	6738
KEGG	C02147
MeSH	Dihydrolipoic+acid
PubChem CID	421
UNII	7NV2KHU5JA
CompTox Dashboard (EPA)	DTXSID50861946 DTXSID60963521, DTXSID50861946
- InChI: InChI=1S/C8H16O2S2/c9-8(10)4-2-1-3-7(12)5-6-11/h7,11-12H,1-6H2,(H,9,10) Key: IZFHEQBZOYJLPK-UHFFFAOYSA-N; InChI=1/C8H16O2S2/c9-8(10)4-2-1-3-7(12)5-6-11/h7,11-12H,1-6H2,(H,9,10) Key: IZFHEQBZOYJLPK-UHFFFAOYAP
- SMILES: C(CCC(=O)O)CC(CCS)S

Properties
Chemical formula	C_{8}H_{16}O_{2}S_{2}
Molar mass	208.33 g·mol^{−1}
- Except where otherwise noted, data are given for materials in their standard state (at 25 °C [77 °F], 100 kPa). verify (what is ?) Infobox references

Dihydrolipoic acid is an organic compound that is the reduced form of lipoic acid. This carboxylic acid features a pair of thiol groups, and therefore is a dithiol. It is optically active, but only the R-enantiomer is biochemically significant. The lipoic acid/dihydrolipoic acid pair participate in a variety of biochemical transformations.

== See also ==
- Dihydrolipoamide
- Lipoamide
- Lipoic acid trisulfide
