= D-Glyceric acidemia =

- Other names: D-glycerate kinase deficiency
- This condition is inherited in an autosomal recessive manner.

D-Glyceric Acidemia (a.k.a. D-Glyceric Aciduria) is an inherited disease, in the category of inborn errors of metabolism. It is caused by a mutation in the gene GLYCTK, which encodes for the enzyme glycerate kinase.

== Pathophysiology ==
Glycerate kinase is an enzyme that catalyzes the conversion of D-glyceric acid (a.k.a. D-glycerate) to 2-phosphoglycerate. This conversion is an intermediary reaction found in several metabolic pathways, including the degradation (break-down; catabolism) of serine, as well as the breakdown of fructose.

A deficiency in glycerate kinase activity leads to the accumulation of D-glyceric acid (a.k.a. D-glycerate) in bodily fluids and tissues. D-glyceric acid can be measured in a laboratory that performs analyte testing for organic acids in blood (plasma) and urine.

Symptoms of the disease (in its most severe form) include progressive neurological impairment, mental/motor retardation, hypotonia, seizures, failure to thrive and metabolic acidosis.

== Diagnosis ==
=== Differential diagnosis ===
D-Glyceric acidemia should not be confused with L-Glyceric acidemia (a.k.a. L-glyceric aciduria, a.k.a. primary hyperoxaluria type II), which is associated with mutations in the GRHPR (encoding for the enzyme 'glyoxylate reductase/hydroxypyruvate reductase').
