= Lipoyl(octanoyl) transferase =

Enzyme that catalyzes chemical reaction

Identifiers
- EC no.: 2.3.1.181

Databases
- IntEnz: IntEnz view
- BRENDA: BRENDA entry
- ExPASy: NiceZyme view
- KEGG: KEGG entry
- MetaCyc: metabolic pathway
- PRIAM: profile
- PDB structures: RCSB PDB PDBe PDBsum
Search
- PMC: articles
- PubMed: articles
- NCBI: proteins

In enzymology, a lipoyl(octanoyl) transferase (EC 2.3.1.181) is an enzyme that catalyzes the chemical reaction

octanoyl-[acyl-carrier-protein] + protein $\rightleftharpoons$ protein N^{6}-(octanoyl)lysine + acyl carrier protein

Thus, the two substrates of this enzyme are octanoyl-[acyl-carrier-protein] and protein, whereas its two products are protein N6-(octanoyl)lysine and acyl carrier protein.

This enzyme belongs to the family of transferases, specifically those acyltransferases transferring groups other than aminoacyl groups. The systematic name of this enzyme class is octanoyl-[acyl-carrier-protein]:protein N-octanoyltransferase. Other names in common use include LipB, lipoyl (octanoyl)-[acyl-carrier-protein]-protein, N-lipoyltransferase, lipoyl (octanoyl)-acyl carrier protein:protein transferase, lipoate/octanoate transferase, lipoyltransferase, octanoyl-[acyl carrier protein]-protein N-octanoyltransferase, and lipoyl(octanoyl)transferase. This enzyme participates in lipoic acid metabolism.
