= Lipoate–protein ligase =

Identifiers
- EC no.: 2.7.7.63
- CAS no.: 144114-18-1

Databases
- BRENDA: enzyme data
- ExPASy: NiceZyme view
- KEGG: enzyme entry
- MetaCyc: metabolic pathway
- Rhea: reactions
- PDB structures: RCSB PDB PDBe PDBsum
Search
- PMC: articles
- PubMed: articles
- NCBI: proteins

Lipoate–protein ligase (EC 2.7.7.63, LplA, lipoate protein ligase, lipoate–protein ligase A, LPL, LPL-B) is an enzyme with systematic name ATP:lipoate adenylyltransferase. This enzyme catalyses the following chemical reaction

(1) ATP + lipoate $\rightleftharpoons$ diphosphate + lipoyl-AMP
(2) lipoyl-AMP + apoprotein $\rightleftharpoons$ protein N^{6}-(lipoyl)lysine + AMP

This enzyme requires Mg^{2+} as a cofactor.
