= Sodium-dependent multivitamin transporter =

Mammalian protein found in Homo sapiens

SLC5A6

Identifiers
- Aliases: SLC5A6, SMVT, solute carrier family 5 member 6, NERIB
- External IDs: OMIM: 604024; MGI: 2660847; GeneCards: SLC5A6

Gene location (Human)
Chr.	Chromosome 2 (human)
Band	2p23.3	Start	27,199,587 bp
Band	2p23.3	End	27,212,958 bp

Gene location (Mouse)
Chr.	Chromosome 5 (mouse)
Band	5|5 B1	Start	31,193,380 bp
Band	5|5 B1	End	31,206,268 bp
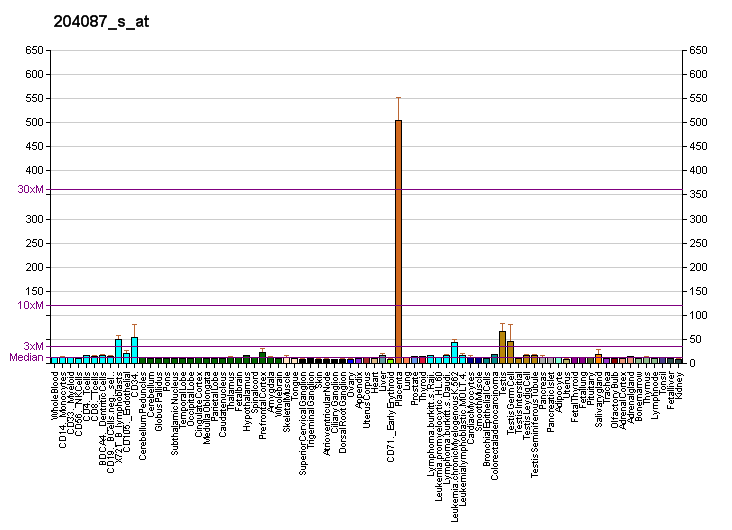
RNA expression pattern
Bgee	Human / Mouse (ortholog); Top expressed in: right lobe of liver; right testis; left testis; right frontal lobe; placenta; right hemisphere of cerebellum; body of uterus; left uterine tube; right ovary; corpus epididymis / Top expressed in: choroid plexus of fourth ventricle; morula; morula; yolk sac; Epithelium of choroid plexus; blastocyst; right kidney; Ileal epithelium; neural layer of retina; dentate gyrus of hippocampal formation granule cell; More reference expression data
BioGPS	More reference expression data
Gene ontology
Molecular function	symporter activity; sodium-dependent multivitamin transmembrane transporter activity; transmembrane transporter activity
Cellular component	vesicle membrane; integral component of membrane; brush border membrane; plasma membrane; integral component of plasma membrane; membrane
Biological process	ion transport; sodium ion transport; biotin transport; pantothenate transmembrane transport; transmembrane transport; biotin metabolic process; pantothenate metabolic process
Sources:Amigo / QuickGO
Orthologs
Databases	NCBI: entry; OMA: entry
Species	Human	Mouse
Entrez	8884	330064
Ensembl	ENSG00000138074	ENSMUSG00000006641
UniProt	Q9Y289	Q5U4D8
RefSeq (mRNA)	NM_021095	NM_001177621; NM_001177622; NM_177870; NM_001360022
RefSeq (protein)	NP_066918	NP_001171092; NP_001171093; NP_808538; NP_001346951
Location (UCSC)	Chr 2: 27.2 – 27.21 Mb	Chr 5: 31.19 – 31.21 Mb
PubMed search
- Wikidata
View/Edit Human	View/Edit Mouse

Sodium-dependent multivitamin transporter is a protein that in humans is encoded by the SLC5A6 gene.

The SMVT is a transporter for pantothenic acid (vitamin B5) and biotin (vitamin B7) at the blood–brain barrier. It is also a transporter for lipoic acid and iodide. Transport of these nutrients is competitive and a surplus of a given nutrient may saturate the transporter and prevent the uptake of other nutrients.
