= Octanoyl-(GcvH):protein N-octanoyltransferase =

Identifiers
- EC no.: 2.3.1.204

Databases
- IntEnz: IntEnz view
- BRENDA: BRENDA entry
- ExPASy: NiceZyme view
- KEGG: KEGG entry
- MetaCyc: metabolic pathway
- PRIAM: profile
- PDB structures: RCSB PDB PDBe PDBsum
Search
- PMC: articles
- PubMed: articles
- NCBI: proteins

Octanoyl-(GcvH):protein N-octanoyltransferase (EC 2.3.1.204, LIPL, octanoyl-[GcvH]:E2 amidotransferase, YWFL (gene)) is an enzyme with systematic name (glycine cleavage system H)-N^{6}-octanoyl-L-lysine:(lipoyl-carrier protein)-N^{6}-L-lysine octanoyltransferase. This enzyme catalyses the following chemical reaction

[glycine cleavage system H]-N^{6}-octanoyl-L-lysine + [lipoyl-carrier protein] $\rightleftharpoons$ glycine cleavage system H + [lipoyl-carrier protein]-N^{6}-octanoyl-L-lysine

This enzyme is purified from the bacterium Bacillus subtilis.
