= Dihydrolipoyllysine-residue succinyltransferase =

dihydrolipoyllysine-residue succinyltransferase
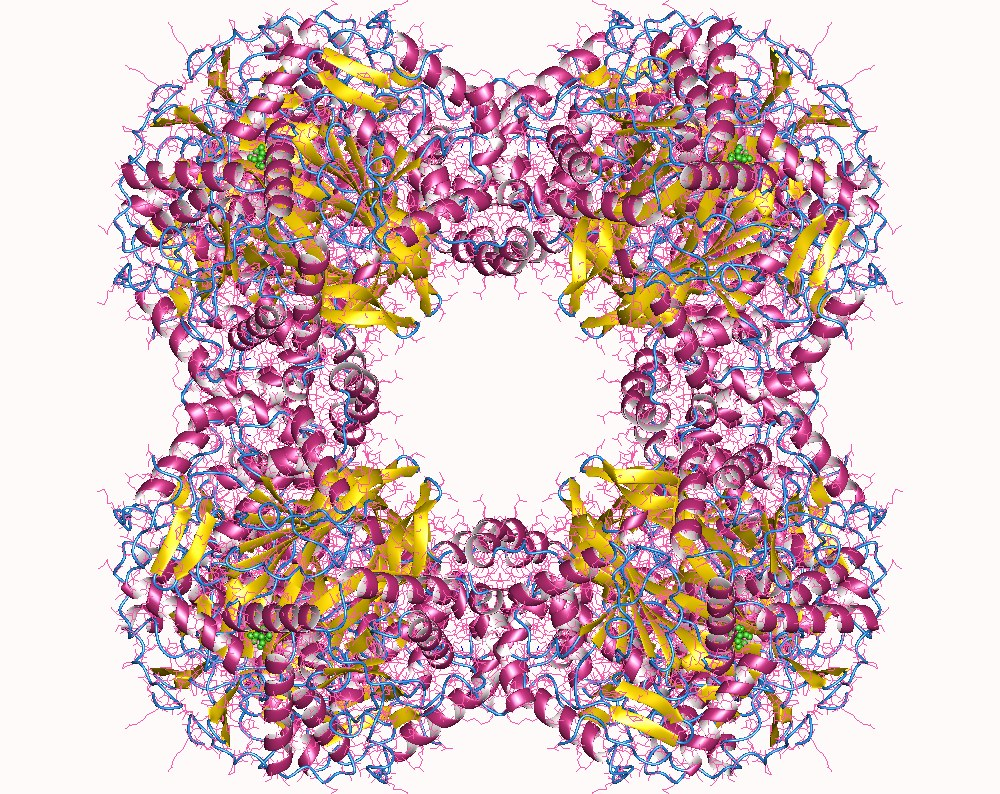
- dihydrolipoamide succinyltransferase homo24mer

Identifiers
- EC no.: 2.3.1.61
- CAS no.: 9032-28-4

Databases
- BRENDA: enzyme data
- ExPASy: NiceZyme view
- KEGG: enzyme entry
- MetaCyc: metabolic pathway
- Rhea: reactions
- PDB structures: RCSB PDB PDBe PDBsum
- Gene Ontology: AmiGO / QuickGO
Search
- PMC: articles
- PubMed: articles
- NCBI: proteins

In enzymology, a dihydrolipoyllysine-residue succinyltransferase (EC 2.3.1.61) is an enzyme that catalyzes the chemical reaction

succinyl-CoA + enzyme N_{6}-(dihydrolipoyl)lysine $\rightleftharpoons$ CoA + enzyme N_{6}-(S-succinyldihydrolipoyl)lysine

Thus, the two substrates of this enzyme are succinyl-CoA and enzyme N6-(dihydrolipoyl)lysine, whereas its two products are CoA and enzyme N6-(S-succinyldihydrolipoyl)lysine.

This enzyme belongs to the family of transferases, specifically those acyltransferases transferring groups other than aminoacyl groups. The systematic name of this enzyme class is succinyl-CoA:enzyme-N6-(dihydrolipoyl)lysine S-succinyltransferase. Other names in common use include dihydrolipoamide S-succinyltransferase, dihydrolipoamide succinyltransferase, dihydrolipoic transsuccinylase, dihydrolipolyl transsuccinylase, dihydrolipoyl transsuccinylase, lipoate succinyltransferase (Escherichia coli), lipoic transsuccinylase, lipoyl transsuccinylase, succinyl-CoA:dihydrolipoamide S-succinyltransferase, succinyl-CoA:dihydrolipoate S-succinyltransferase, and enzyme-dihydrolipoyllysine:succinyl-CoA S-succinyltransferase. This enzyme participates in citrate cycle (tca cycle) and lysine degradation.

== Structural studies ==
As of late 2007, 11 structures have been solved for this class of enzymes, with PDB accession codes PDB: 1BAL, PDB: 1BBL, PDB: 1C4T, PDB: 1E2O, PDB: 1GHJ, PDB: 1GHK, PDB: 1PMR, PDB: 1SCZ, PDB: 2BTG, PDB: 2BTH, and PDB: 2CYU.
