= Glycerate kinase =

Identifiers
- EC no.: 2.7.1.31
- CAS no.: 9026-61-3

Databases
- BRENDA: enzyme data
- ExPASy: NiceZyme view
- KEGG: enzyme entry
- MetaCyc: metabolic pathway
- Rhea: reactions
- PDB structures: RCSB PDB PDBe PDBsum
- Gene Ontology: AmiGO / QuickGO
Search
- PMC: articles
- PubMed: articles
- NCBI: proteins

Glycerate kinase

Identifiers
- Symbol: Glyc_kinase
- Pfam: PF02595
- InterPro: IPR004381
Available protein structures:
- PDB: PDB: 1to6 IPR004381 PF02595 (ECOD; PDBsum)
- AlphaFold: IPR004381; PF02595

Glycerate kinase (EC 2.7.1.31) is an enzyme that catalyzes the chemical reaction

ATP +
D-glyceric acid
ADP +
3-phospho-D-glyceric acid

The enzyme characterised from liver and Escherichia coli converts D-glyceric acid to 3-phospho-D-glyceric acid by transferring a phosphate group from the cofactor, adenosine triphosphate (ATP), which is converted to adenosine diphosphate (ADP).

This enzyme is a transferases, specifically one transferring phosphorus-containing groups (phosphotransferases) with an alcohol group as acceptor. The systematic name of this enzyme class is ATP:(R)-glycerate 3-phosphotransferase. Other names in common use include glycerate kinase (phosphorylating), D-glycerate 3-kinase, D-glycerate kinase, glycerate-3-kinase, GK, D-glyceric acid kinase, and ATP:D-glycerate 2-phosphotransferase. This enzyme participates in 3 metabolic pathways: serine/glycine/threonine metabolism, glycerolipid metabolism, and glyoxylate-dicarboxylate metabolism.

Some related enzymes produce the isomeric 2-phospho-D-glyceric acid.

== Structural studies ==
As of late 2007, 3 structures have been solved for this class of enzymes, with PDB accession codes PDB: 1TO6, PDB: 1X3L, and PDB: 2B8N.
