= Lipoic acid =

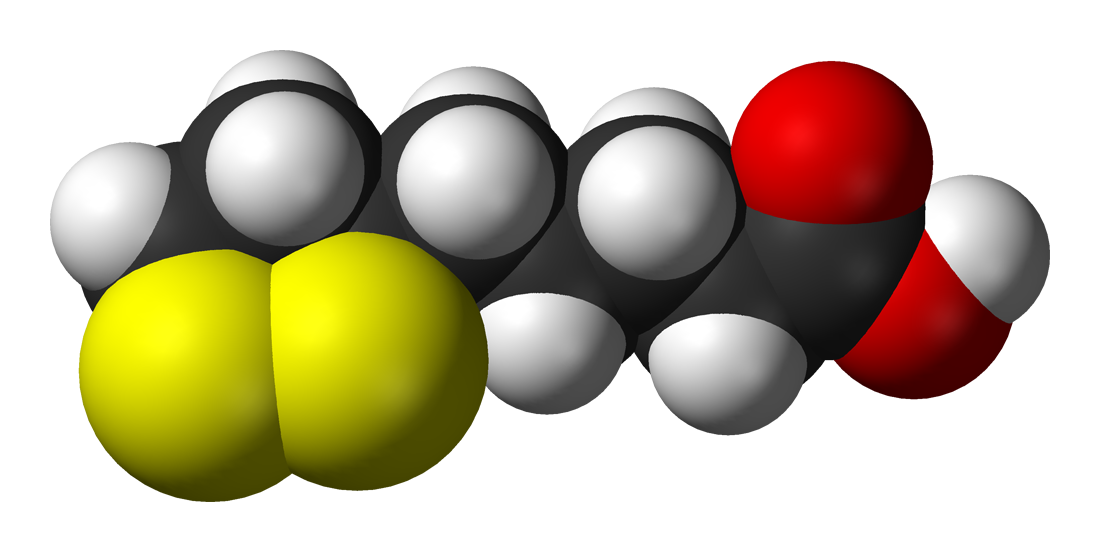

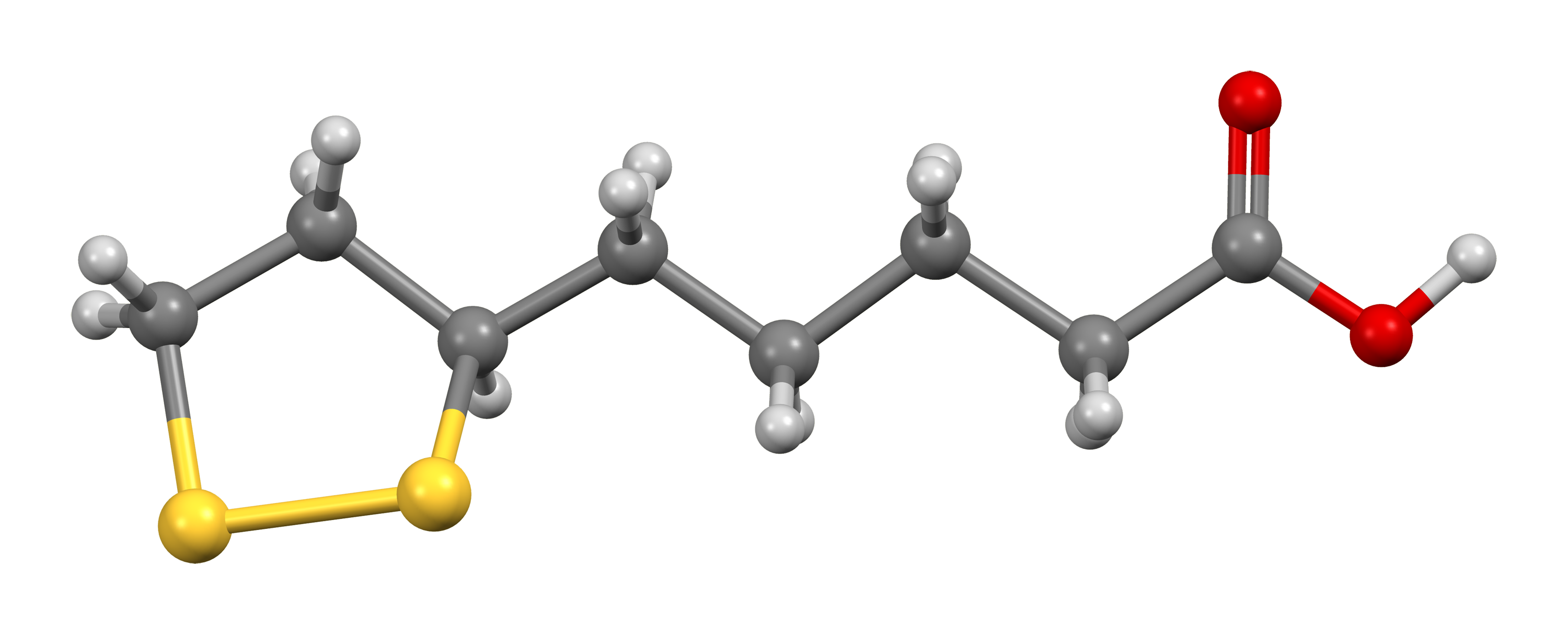

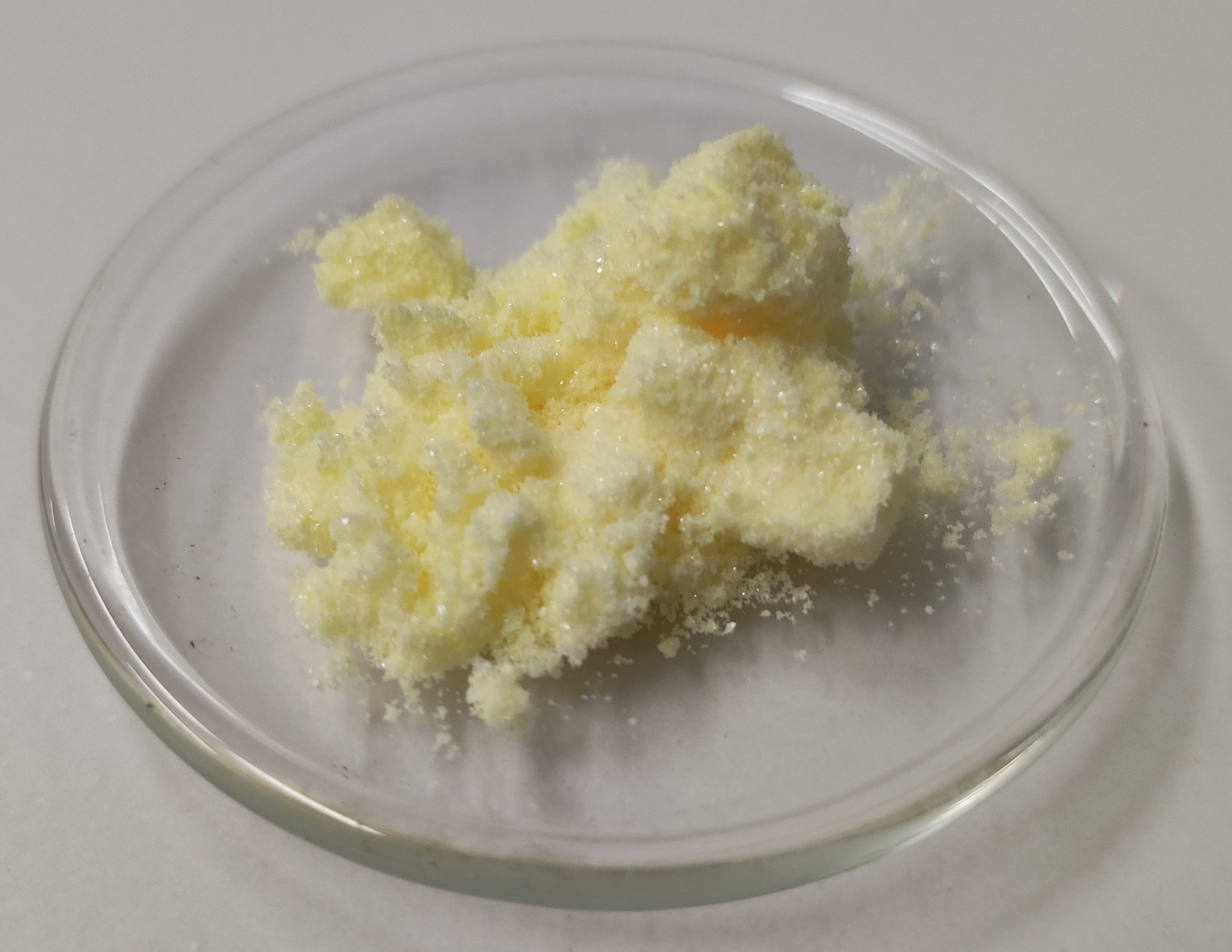

Names
- IUPAC name (R)-5-(1,2-Dithiolan-3-yl)pentanoic acid
- Other names α-Lipoic acid; Alpha lipoic acid; Thioctic acid; 6,8-Dithiooctanoic acid

Identifiers
CAS Number	1077-28-7 (racemate); 1200-22-2 (R)
3D model (JSmol)	Interactive image
Beilstein Reference	81851
ChEBI	CHEBI:30314
ChEMBL	ChEMBL134342
ChemSpider	5886
DrugBank	DB00166
ECHA InfoCard	100.012.793
EC Number	214-071-2
IUPHAR/BPS	4822
KEGG	C16241
MeSH	Lipoic+acid
PubChem CID	6112
UNII	73Y7P0K73Y (racemate); VLL71EBS9Z (R)
CompTox Dashboard (EPA)	DTXSID7025508
- InChI: InChI=1S/C8H14O2S2/c9-8(10)4-2-1-3-7-5-6-11-12-7/h7H,1-6H2,(H,9,10)/t7-/m1/s1 Key: AGBQKNBQESQNJD-SSDOTTSWSA-N; InChI=1/C8H14O2S2/c9-8(10)4-2-1-3-7-5-6-11-12-7/h7H,1-6H2,(H,9,10)/t7-/m1/s1 Key: AGBQKNBQESQNJD-SSDOTTSWBZ
- SMILES: O=C(O)CCCC[C@H]1SSCC1

Properties
Chemical formula	C_{8}H_{14}O_{2}S_{2}
Molar mass	206.32 g·mol^{−1}
Appearance	Yellow needle-like crystals
Melting point	60–62 °C (140–144 °F; 333–335 K)
Solubility in water	0.24 g/L
Solubility in ethanol 50 mg/mL	Soluble

Pharmacology
ATC code	A16AX01 (WHO)
- Pharmacokinetics
Bioavailability	30% (oral)

Related compounds
Related compounds	Lipoamide; Asparagusic acid
- Except where otherwise noted, data are given for materials in their standard state (at 25 °C [77 °F], 100 kPa). verify (what is ?) Infobox references

Lipoic acid (LA), also known as α-lipoic acid, alpha-lipoic acid (ALA) and thioctic acid, is an organosulfur compound derived from caprylic acid (octanoic acid). ALA, which is made in animals normally, is essential for aerobic metabolism. It is also available as a dietary supplement or pharmaceutical drug in some countries. Lipoate is the conjugate base of lipoic acid, and the most prevalent form of LA under physiological conditions. Only the (R)-(+)-enantiomer (RLA) exists in nature. RLA is an essential cofactor of many processes.

== Physical and chemical properties ==
Lipoic acid contains two sulfur atoms connected by a disulfide bond in the 1,2-dithiolane ring. It also carries a carboxylic acid group. It is considered to be oxidized relative to its acyclic relative dihydrolipoic acid, in which each sulfur exists as a thiol. It is a yellow solid.

(R)-(+)-lipoic acid (RLA) occurs naturally, but (S)-(-)-lipoic acid (SLA) has been synthesized.

For use in dietary supplement materials and compounding pharmacies, the USP established an official monograph for R/S-LA.

== Biological function ==
Lipoic acid is a cofactor for five enzymes or classes of enzymes: pyruvate dehydrogenase, α-ketoglutarate dehydrogenase, the glycine cleavage system, branched-chain alpha-keto acid dehydrogenase, and the α-oxo(keto)adipate dehydrogenase. The first two are critical to the citric acid cycle. The GCS regulates glycine concentrations.

HDAC1, HDAC2, HDAC3, HDAC6, HDAC8, and HDAC10 are targets of the reduced form (open dithiol) of (R)-lipoic acid.

=== Biosynthesis and attachment ===
Most endogenously produced RLA are not "free" because octanoic acid, the precursor to RLA, is bound to the enzyme complexes prior to enzymatic insertion of the sulfur atoms. As a cofactor, RLA is covalently attached by an amide bond to a terminal lysine residue of the enzyme's lipoyl domains. The precursor to lipoic acid, octanoic acid, is made via mitochondrial fatty acid biosynthesis in the form of octanoyl-acyl carrier protein. The octanoate is transferred as a thioester of acyl carrier protein from mitochondrial fatty acid biosynthesis to an amide of the lipoyl domain protein by an enzyme called an octanoyltransferase. Two hydrogens of octanoate are replaced with sulfur groups via a radical SAM mechanism, by lipoyl synthase. As a result, lipoic acid is synthesized attached to proteins and no free lipoic acid is produced. Lipoic acid can be removed whenever proteins are degraded and by action of the enzyme lipoamidase. Free lipoate can be used by some organisms as an enzyme called lipoate protein ligase that attaches it covalently to the correct protein. The ligase activity of this enzyme requires ATP.

=== Cellular transport ===
Along with sodium and the vitamins biotin (B7) and pantothenic acid (B5), lipoic acid enters cells through the SMVT (sodium-dependent multivitamin transporter). Each of the compounds transported by the SMVT is competitive with the others. For example research has shown that increasing intake of lipoic acid or pantothenic acid reduces the uptake of biotin and/or the activities of biotin-dependent enzymes.

=== Enzymatic activity ===
Lipoic acid is a cofactor for at least five enzyme systems. Two of these are in the citric acid cycle through which many organisms turn nutrients into energy. Lipoylated enzymes have lipoic acid attached to them covalently. The lipoyl group transfers acyl groups in 2-oxoacid dehydrogenase complexes, and methylamine group in the glycine cleavage complex or glycine dehydrogenase.

Lipoic acid is the cofactor of the following enzymes in humans:

EC-number	Enzyme	Gene	Multienzyme complex	Role of the complex
EC 2.3.1.12	dihydrolipoyl transacetylase (E2)	DLAT	pyruvate dehydrogenase complex (PDC)	Connection of glycolysis with the citric acid cycle
EC 2.3.1.61	dihydrolipoyl succinyltransferase (E2)	DLST	oxoglutarate dehydrogenase complex (OGDC)	Citric acid cycle enzyme
EC 2.3.1.61	dihydrolipoyl succinyltransferase (E2)	DLST	2-oxoadipate dehydrogenase complex (OADHC)	Lysine, tryptophan and hydroxylysine degradation
EC 2.3.1.168	dihydrolipoyl transacylase (E2)	DBT	branched-chain α-ketoacid dehydrogenase complex (BCKDC)	Leucine, isoleucine and valine degradation
	H-protein	GCSH	glycine cleavage system (GCS)	Glycine and serine metabolism, folate metabolism

The most-studied of these is the pyruvate dehydrogenase complex. These complexes have three central subunits: E1-3, which are the decarboxylase, lipoyl transferase, and dihydrolipoamide dehydrogenase, respectively. These complexes have a central E2 core and the other subunits surround this core to form the complex. In the gap between these two subunits, the lipoyl domain ferries intermediates between the active sites. The lipoyl domain itself is attached by a flexible linker to the E2 core and the number of lipoyl domains varies from one to three for a given organism. The number of domains has been experimentally varied and seems to have little effect on growth until over nine are added, although more than three decreased activity of the complex.

Lipoic acid serves as co-factor to the acetoin dehydrogenase complex catalyzing the conversion of acetoin (3-hydroxy-2-butanone) to acetaldehyde and acetyl coenzyme A.

The glycine cleavage system differs from the other complexes, and has a different nomenclature. In this system, the H protein is a free lipoyl domain with additional helices, the L protein is a dihydrolipoamide dehydrogenase, the P protein is the decarboxylase, and the T protein transfers the methylamine from lipoate to tetrahydrofolate (THF) yielding methylene-THF and ammonia. Methylene-THF is then used by serine hydroxymethyltransferase to synthesize serine from glycine. This system is part of plant photorespiration.

=== Biological sources and degradation ===
Lipoic acid is present in many foods in which it is bound to lysine in proteins, but slightly more so in kidney, heart, liver, spinach, broccoli, and yeast extract. Naturally occurring lipoic acid is always covalently bound and not readily available from dietary sources. In addition, the amount of lipoic acid present in dietary sources is low. For instance, the purification of lipoic acid to determine its structure used an estimated 10 tons of liver residue, which yielded 30 mg of lipoic acid.

Baseline levels (prior to supplementation) of RLA and R-DHLA have not been detected in human plasma. RLA has been detected at 12.3−43.1 ng/mL following acid hydrolysis, which releases protein-bound lipoic acid. Enzymatic hydrolysis of protein bound lipoic acid released 1.4−11.6 ng/mL and <1-38.2 ng/mL using subtilisin and alcalase, respectively.

Digestive proteolytic enzymes cleave the R-lipoyllysine residue from the mitochondrial enzyme complexes derived from food but are unable to cleave the lipoic acid-L-lysine amide bond. Both synthetic lipoamide and (R)-lipoyl-L-lysine are rapidly cleaved by serum lipoamidases, which release free (R)-lipoic acid and either L-lysine or ammonia. Little is known about the degradation and utilization of aliphatic sulfides such as lipoic acid, except for cysteine.

Lipoic acid is metabolized in a variety of ways when given as a dietary supplement in mammals. Degradation to tetranorlipoic acid in which the four CH_{2}-groups between the ring and the carboxilic acid are removed, oxidation of one or both of the sulfur atoms to the sulfoxide, and S-methylation of the sulfide occur. Degradation of lipoic acid is similar in humans, although it is not clear if the sulfur atoms become significantly oxidized.

== Diseases ==
=== Combined malonic and methylmalonic aciduria (CMAMMA) ===
In the metabolic disease combined malonic and methylmalonic aciduria (CMAMMA) due to ACSF3 deficiency, mitochondrial fatty acid synthesis (mtFAS), which is the precursor reaction of lipoic acid biosynthesis, is impaired. The result is a reduced lipoylation degree of important mitochondrial enzymes, such as pyruvate dehydrogenase complex (PDC) and α-ketoglutarate dehydrogenase complex (α-KGDHC). Supplementation with lipoic acid does not restore mitochondrial function.

== Chemical synthesis ==

SLA did not exist prior to chemical synthesis in 1952. SLA is produced in equal amounts with RLA during achiral manufacturing processes. The racemic form was more widely used clinically in Europe and Japan in the 1950s to 1960s despite the early recognition that the various forms of LA are not bioequivalent. The first synthetic procedures appeared for RLA and SLA in the mid-1950s. Advances in chiral chemistry led to more efficient technologies for manufacturing the single enantiomers by both classical resolution and asymmetric synthesis and the demand for RLA also grew at this time. In the 21st century, R/S-LA, RLA and SLA with high chemical and/or optical purities are available in industrial quantities. At the current time, most of the world supply of R/S-LA and RLA is manufactured in China and smaller amounts in Italy, Germany, and Japan. RLA is produced by modifications of a process first described by Georg Lang in a Ph.D. thesis and later patented by Degussa. Although RLA is favored nutritionally due to its "vitamin-like" role in metabolism, both RLA and R/S-LA are widely available as dietary supplements. Both stereospecific and non-stereospecific reactions are known to occur in vivo and contribute to the mechanisms of action, but evidence to date indicates RLA may be the eutomer (the nutritionally and therapeutically preferred form).

== Pharmacology ==
=== Pharmacokinetics ===
A 2007 human pharmacokinetic study of sodium RLA demonstrated the maximum concentration in plasma and bioavailability are significantly greater than the free acid form, and rivals plasma levels achieved by intravenous administration of the free acid form. Additionally, high plasma levels comparable to those in animal models where Nrf2 was activated were achieved.

The various forms of LA are not bioequivalent. Very few studies compare individual enantiomers with racemic lipoic acid. It is unclear if twice as much racemic lipoic acid can replace RLA.

The toxic dose of LA in cats is much lower than that in humans or dogs and produces hepatocellular toxicity.

=== Pharmacodynamics ===
The mechanism and action of lipoic acid when supplied externally to an organism is controversial. Lipoic acid in a cell seems primarily to induce the oxidative stress response rather than directly scavenge free radicals. This effect is specific for RLA. Despite the strongly reducing milieu, LA has been detected intracellularly in both oxidized and reduced forms. LA is able to scavenge reactive oxygen and reactive nitrogen species in a biochemical assay due to long incubation times, but there is little evidence this occurs within a cell or that radical scavenging contributes to the primary mechanisms of action of LA. The relatively good scavenging activity of LA toward hypochlorous acid (a bactericidal produced by neutrophils that may produce inflammation and tissue damage) is due to the strained conformation of the 5-membered dithiolane ring, which is lost upon reduction to DHLA. In cells, LA is reduced to dihydrolipoic acid, which is generally regarded as the more bioactive form of LA and the form responsible for most of the antioxidant effects and for lowering the redox activities of unbound iron and copper. This theory has been challenged due to the high level of reactivity of the two free sulfhydryls, low intracellular concentrations of DHLA as well as the rapid methylation of one or both sulfhydryls, rapid side-chain oxidation to shorter metabolites and rapid efflux from the cell. Although both DHLA and LA have been found inside cells after administration, most intracellular DHLA probably exists as mixed disulfides with various cysteine residues from cytosolic and mitochondrial proteins. Recent findings suggest therapeutic and anti-aging effects are due to modulation of signal transduction and gene transcription, which improve the antioxidant status of the cell. However, this likely occurs via pro-oxidant mechanisms, not by radical scavenging or reducing effects.

All the disulfide forms of LA (R/S-LA, RLA and SLA) can be reduced to DHLA although both tissue specific and stereoselective (preference for one enantiomer over the other) reductions have been reported in model systems. At least two cytosolic enzymes, glutathione reductase (GR) and thioredoxin reductase (Trx1), and two mitochondrial enzymes, lipoamide dehydrogenase and thioredoxin reductase (Trx2), reduce LA. SLA is stereoselectively reduced by cytosolic GR whereas Trx1, Trx2 and lipoamide dehydrogenase stereoselectively reduce RLA. (R)-(+)-lipoic acid is enzymatically or chemically reduced to (R)-(-)-dihydrolipoic acid whereas (S)-(-)-lipoic acid is reduced to (S)-(+)-dihydrolipoic acid. Dihydrolipoic acid (DHLA) can also form intracellularly and extracellularly via non-enzymatic, thiol-disulfide exchange reactions.

RLA may function in vivo like a B-vitamin and at higher doses like plant-derived nutrients, such as curcumin, sulforaphane, resveratrol, and other nutritional substances that induce phase II detoxification enzymes, thus acting as cytoprotective agents. This stress response indirectly improves the antioxidant capacity of the cell.

The (S)-enantiomer of LA was shown to be toxic when administered to thiamine-deficient rats.

Several studies have demonstrated that SLA either has lower activity than RLA or interferes with the specific effects of RLA by competitive inhibition.

== Uses ==
R/S-LA and RLA are widely available as over-the-counter nutritional supplements in the United States in the form of capsules, tablets, and aqueous liquids, and have been marketed as antioxidants and pertaining to cellular glucose utilization for metabolic disorders and type 2 diabetes.

Although the body can synthesize LA, it can also be absorbed from the diet. Dietary supplementation in doses from 200–600 mg is likely to provide up to 1000 times the amount available from a regular diet. Gastrointestinal absorption is variable and decreases with the use of food. It is therefore recommended that dietary LA be taken 30–60 minutes before or at least 120 minutes after a meal. Maximum blood levels of LA are achieved 30–60 minutes after dietary supplementation, and it is thought to be largely metabolized in the liver.

In Germany, LA is approved as a drug for the treatment of diabetic neuropathy since 1966 and is available as a non-prescription pharmaceutical.

== Clinical research ==
Although lipoic acid has been tested in clinical research for potential use as a therapy for various diseases, the studies have been of limited quality, with no conclusive evidence that it is warranted as a therapeutic, as of 2026.

According to the American Cancer Society as of 2013, "there is no reliable scientific evidence at this time that lipoic acid prevents the development or spread of cancer".

As of 2015, intravenously administered ALA is unapproved anywhere in the world except Germany for diabetic neuropathy, but has been proven reasonably safe and effective. As of 2012, there was no good evidence alpha lipoic acid helps people with mitochondrial disorders.

A 2018 review found that ALA had a small effect to reduce body weight, but is not cost-effective as a dietary supplement.

A 2025 study indicated a positive effect in a cellular model of Friedreich's ataxia.

== Other lipoic acids ==
- β-lipoic acid is a thiosulfinate of α-lipoic acid

== See also ==
- Aminolevulinic acid
- Biotin
- Diallyl trisulfide
- Dihydrolipoic acid
- Ergothioneine
- Lipoic acid trisulfide
- Lipoamide
- Sulforaphane
