= Glycine dehydrogenase (decarboxylating) =

Protein-coding gene in the species Homo sapiens

GLDC

Identifiers
- Aliases: GLDC, GCE, GCSP, HYGN1, Glycine dehydrogenase, glycine decarboxylase
- External IDs: OMIM: 238300; MGI: 1341155; HomoloGene: 141; GeneCards: GLDC; OMA:GLDC - orthologs

Gene location (Human)
Chr.	Chromosome 9 (human)
Band	9p24.1	Start	6,532,467 bp
Band	9p24.1	End	6,645,729 bp

Gene location (Mouse)
Chr.	Chromosome 19 (mouse)
Band	19 C1|19 24.87 cM	Start	30,075,847 bp
Band	19 C1|19 24.87 cM	End	30,152,829 bp
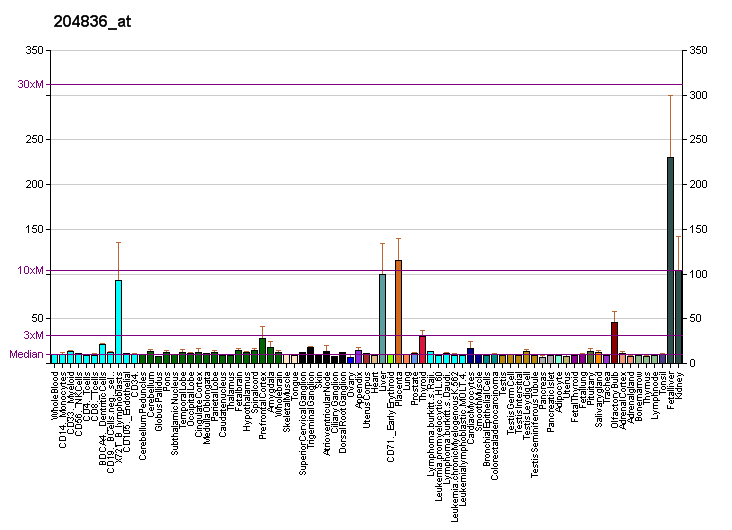
RNA expression pattern
Bgee	Human / Mouse (ortholog); Top expressed in: right lobe of liver; kidney tubule; gonad; human kidney; ventricular zone; sural nerve; placenta; metanephric glomerulus; testicle; embryo / Top expressed in: otic placode; otic vesicle; yolk sac; morula; primitive streak; morula; epiblast; left lobe of liver; right kidney; ciliary body; More reference expression data
BioGPS	More reference expression data
Gene ontology
Molecular function	lyase activity; electron transfer activity; oxidoreductase activity; catalytic activity; pyridoxal phosphate binding; protein dimerization activity; glycine binding; glycine dehydrogenase (decarboxylating) activity; protein homodimerization activity; pyridoxal binding; enzyme binding
Cellular component	mitochondrial matrix; plasma membrane; nucleus; glycine cleavage complex; mitochondrion
Biological process	cellular amino acid metabolic process; glycine metabolic process; glycine decarboxylation via glycine cleavage system; glycine catabolic process; response to methylamine; response to lipoic acid; cellular response to leukemia inhibitory factor; electron transport chain
Sources:Amigo / QuickGO
Orthologs
Species	Human	Mouse
Entrez	2731	104174
Ensembl	ENSG00000178445	ENSMUSG00000024827
UniProt	P23378	Q91W43
RefSeq (mRNA)	NM_000170	NM_138595
RefSeq (protein)	NP_000161	NP_613061
Location (UCSC)	Chr 9: 6.53 – 6.65 Mb	Chr 19: 30.08 – 30.15 Mb
PubMed search
- Wikidata
View/Edit Human	View/Edit Mouse

glycine decarboxylase

Identifiers
- EC no.: 1.4.4.2
- CAS no.: 37259-67-9

Databases
- IntEnz: IntEnz view
- BRENDA: BRENDA entry
- ExPASy: NiceZyme view
- KEGG: KEGG entry
- MetaCyc: metabolic pathway
- PRIAM: profile
- PDB structures: RCSB PDB PDBe PDBsum
- Gene Ontology: AmiGO / QuickGO
Search
- PMC: articles
- PubMed: articles
- NCBI: proteins

Glycine decarboxylase also known as glycine cleavage system P protein or glycine dehydrogenase is an enzyme that in humans is encoded by the GLDC gene.

== Reaction ==
Glycine decarboxylase (EC 1.4.4.2) is an enzyme that catalyzes the following chemical reaction:

glycine + H-protein-lipoyllysine ⇌ H-protein-S-aminomethyldihydrolipoyllysine + CO_{2}

Thus, the two substrates of this enzyme are glycine and H-protein-lipoyllysine, whereas its two products are H-protein-S-aminomethyldihydrolipoyllysine and CO_{2}.

This enzyme belongs to the family of oxidoreductases, specifically those acting on the CH-NH_{2} group of donors with a disulfide as acceptor. This enzyme participates in glycine, serine and threonine metabolism. It employs one cofactor, pyridoxal phosphate.

== Function ==
Glycine decarboxylase is the P-protein of the glycine cleavage system in eukaryotes. The glycine cleavage system catalyzes the degradation of glycine. The P protein binds the alpha-amino group of glycine through its pyridoxal phosphate cofactor. Carbon dioxide is released and the remaining methylamine moiety is then transferred to the lipoamide cofactor of the H protein.

Degradation of glycine is brought about by the glycine cleavage system, which is composed of four mitochondrial protein components: P protein (a pyridoxal phosphate-dependent glycine decarboxylase), H protein (a lipoic acid-containing protein), T protein (a tetrahydrofolate-requiring enzyme), and L protein (a lipoamide dehydrogenase).

== Clinical significance ==
Glycine encephalopathy is due to defects in GLDC or AMT of the glycine cleavage system.
