= Dihydrolipoamide dehydrogenase =

Protein-coding gene in the species Homo sapiens

DLD
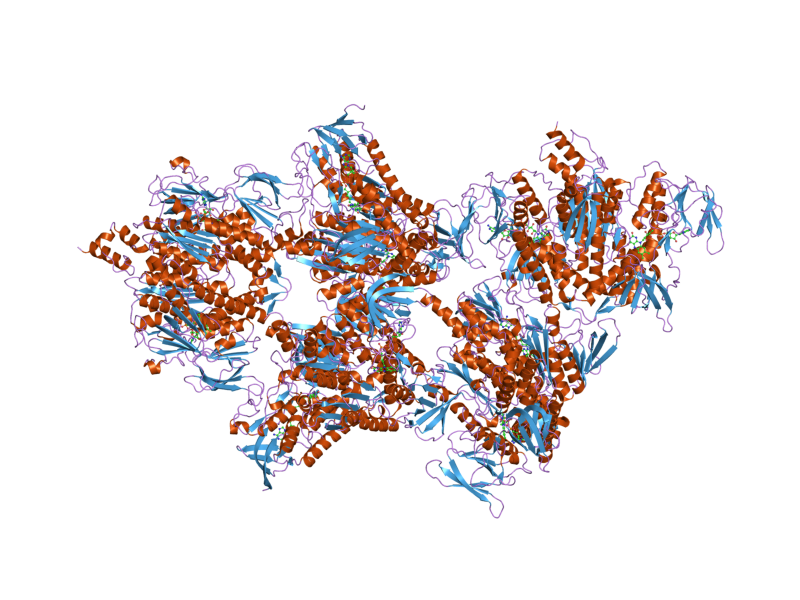

Identifiers
- Aliases: DLD, DLDD, DLDH, E3, GCSL, LAD, PHE3, dihydrolipoamide dehydrogenase, Dihydrolipoamide dehydrogenase, OGDC-E3
- External IDs: OMIM: 238331; MGI: 107450; GeneCards: DLD
Available structures
PDB	Ortholog search: PDBe RCSB
PDB	List of PDB id codes 3RNM, 1ZMC, 1ZMD, 1ZY8, 2F5Z
Enzyme activity
EC #	BRENDA	ExPASy	KEGG	MetaCyc
1.8.1.4	↗	↗	↗	↗

Gene location (Human)
Chr.	Chromosome 7 (human)
Band	7q31.1	Start	107,891,162 bp
Band	7q31.1	End	107,931,730 bp

Gene location (Mouse)
Chr.	Chromosome 12 (mouse)
Band	12 A2|12 13.43 cM	Start	31,381,276 bp
Band	12 A2|12 13.43 cM	End	31,401,452 bp
RNA expression pattern
Bgee	Human / Mouse (ortholog); Top expressed in: right ventricle; biceps brachii; Skeletal muscle tissue of biceps brachii; thoracic diaphragm; Skeletal muscle tissue of rectus abdominis; vastus lateralis muscle; body of tongue; mucosa of sigmoid colon; jejunal mucosa; rectum / Top expressed in: saccule; cardiac muscle tissue of left ventricle; otic placode; tail of embryo; extraocular muscle; intercostal muscle; soleus muscle; extensor digitorum longus muscle; interventricular septum; plantaris muscle; More reference expression data
BioGPS	n/a
Gene ontology
Molecular function	flavin adenine dinucleotide binding; NAD binding; dihydrolipoyl dehydrogenase activity; oxidoreductase activity; pyruvate dehydrogenase (NAD+) activity; lipoamide binding; oxidoreductase activity, acting on a sulfur group of donors, NAD(P) as acceptor; electron transfer activity; protein binding
Cellular component	oxoglutarate dehydrogenase complex; myelin sheath; pyruvate dehydrogenase complex; cilium; acrosomal matrix; nucleoplasm; mitochondrial matrix; mitochondrion; acrosomal vesicle; cytoplasmic vesicle; motile cilium; cell projection; nucleus
Biological process	mitochondrial acetyl-CoA biosynthetic process from pyruvate; regulation of membrane potential; ageing; branched-chain amino acid catabolic process; tricarboxylic acid cycle; 2-oxoglutarate metabolic process; lysine catabolic process; regulation of acetyl-CoA biosynthetic process from pyruvate; cell redox homeostasis; proteolysis; lipoate metabolic process; dihydrolipoamide metabolic process; gastrulation; pyruvate metabolic process; sperm capacitation; acetyl-CoA biosynthetic process from pyruvate; mitochondrial electron transport, NADH to ubiquinone; cellular nitrogen compound metabolic process; histone succinylation
Sources:Amigo / QuickGO
Orthologs
Databases	NCBI: entry; OMA: entry
Species	Human	Mouse
Entrez	1738	13382
Ensembl	ENSG00000091140	ENSMUSG00000020664
UniProt	P09622	O08749
RefSeq (mRNA)	NM_001289752; NM_000108; NM_001289750; NM_001289751	NM_007861
RefSeq (protein)	NP_000099; NP_001276679; NP_001276680; NP_001276681	NP_031887
Location (UCSC)	Chr 7: 107.89 – 107.93 Mb	Chr 12: 31.38 – 31.4 Mb
PubMed search
- Wikidata
View/Edit Human	View/Edit Mouse

Dihydrolipoamide dehydrogenase (DLD), also known as dihydrolipoyl dehydrogenase, mitochondrial, is an enzyme that in humans is encoded by the DLD gene. DLD is a flavoprotein enzyme that oxidizes dihydrolipoamide to lipoamide.

dihydrolipoamide
+ NAD^{+}
H^{+}
H^{+}
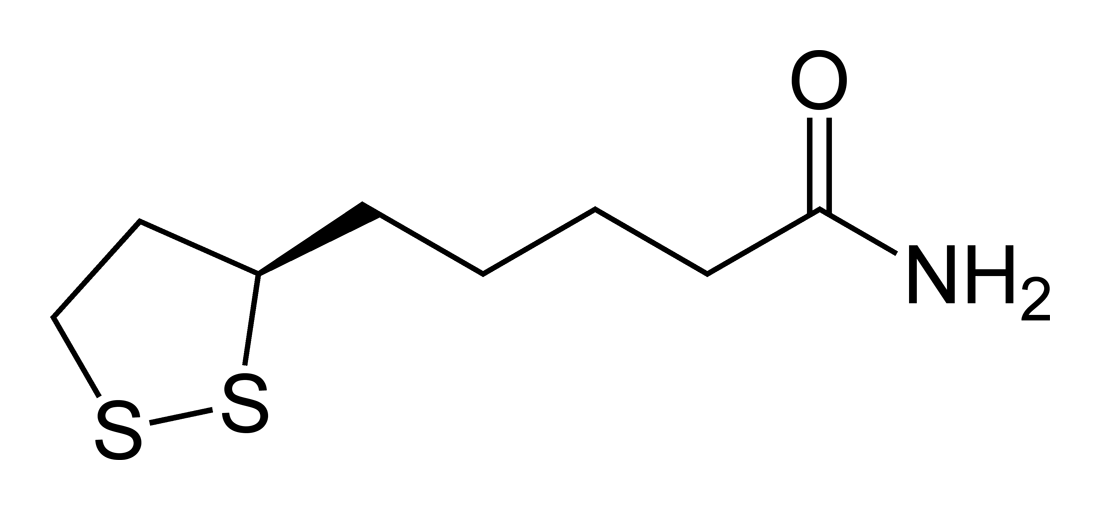
lipoamide
+ NADH

Dihydrolipoamide dehydrogenase (DLD) is a mitochondrial enzyme that plays a vital role in energy metabolism in eukaryotes. This enzyme is required for the complete reaction of at least five different multi-enzyme complexes. Additionally, DLD is a flavoenzyme oxidoreductase that contains a reactive disulfide bridge and a FAD cofactor that are directly involved in catalysis. The enzyme associates into tightly bound homodimers required for its enzymatic activity.

== Structure ==
The protein encoded by the DLD gene comes together with another protein to form a dimer in the central metabolic pathway. Several amino acids within the catalytic pocket have been identified as important to DLD function, including R281 and N473. Although the overall fold of the human enzyme is similar to that of yeast, the human structure is different in that it has two loops that extend from the general protein structure and into the FAD binding sites when bound the NAD+ molecule, required for catalysis, is not close to the FAD moiety. However, when NADH is bound instead, it is stacked directly op top of the FAD central structure. The current hE3 structures show directly that the disease-causing mutations occur at three locations in the human enzyme: the dimer interface, the active site, and the FAD and NAD(+)-binding sites.

== Function ==
The DLD homodimer functions as the E3 component of the pyruvate, α-ketoglutarate, α-adipate and branched-chain amino acid-dehydrogenase complexes and the glycine cleavage system, all in the mitochondrial matrix. In these complexes, DLD converts dihydrolipoic acid and NAD+ into lipoic acid and NADH. DLD also has diaphorase activity, being able to catalyze the oxidation of NADH to NAD+ by using different electron acceptors such as O_{2}, labile ferric iron, nitric oxide, and ubiquinone. DLD is thought to have a pro-oxidant role by reducing oxygen to a superoxide or ferric to ferrous iron, which then catalyzes production of hydroxyl radicals. Diaphorase activity of DLD may have an antioxidant role through its ability to scavenge nitric oxide and to reduce ubiquinone to ubiquinol. The dihyrolipamide dehydrogenase gene is known to have multiple splice variants.

== Moonlighting function ==
Certain DLD mutations can simultaneously induce the loss of a primary metabolic activity and the gain of a moonlighting proteolytic activity. The moonlighting proteolytic activity of DLD is revealed by conditions that destabilize the DLD homodimer and decrease its DLD activity. Acidification of the mitochondrial matrix, as a result of ischemia-reperfusion injury, can disrupt the quaternary structure of DLD leading to decreased dehydrogenase activity and increased diaphorase activity. The moonlighting proteolytic activity of DLD could also arise under pathological conditions. Proteolytic activity can further complicate the reduction in energy metabolism and an increase in oxidative damage as a result of decreased DLD activity and an increase in diaphorase activity respectively. With its proteolytic function, DLD removes a functionally vital domain from the N-terminus of frataxin, a mitochondrial protein involved in iron metabolism and antioxidant protection.

== Clinical significance ==
In humans, mutations in DLD are linked to a severe disorder of infancy with failure to thrive, hypotonia, and metabolic acidosis. DLD deficiency manifests itself in a great degree of variability, which has been attributed to varying effects of different DLD mutations on the stability of the protein and its ability to dimerize or interact with other components of the three α-ketoacid dehydrogenase complexes. With its proteolytic function, DLD causes a deficiency in frataxin, which leads to the neurodegenerative and cardiac disease, Friedreich's ataxia.

== Interactive pathway map ==
Click on genes, proteins and metabolites below to link to respective articles. (Note: The interactive pathway map can be edited at WikiPathways: "TCACycle_WP78".)
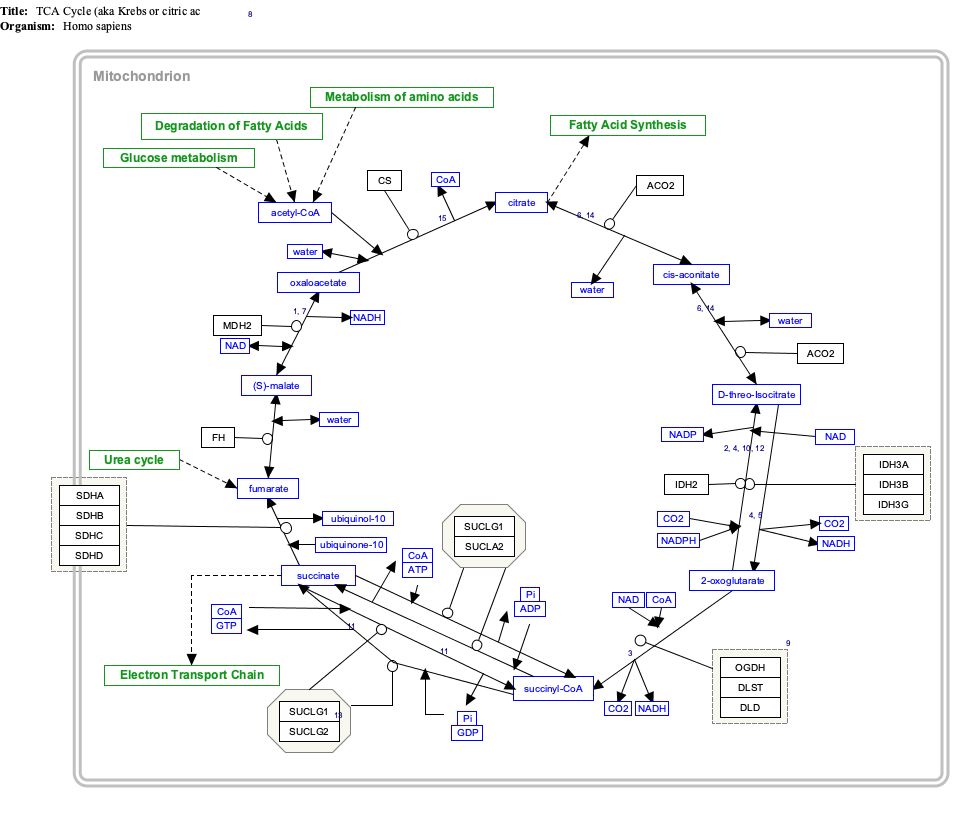

TCACycle_WP78 edit
Click on genes, proteins and metabolites below to link to respective articles. (Note: The interactive pathway map can be edited at WikiPathways: "GlycolysisGluconeogenesis_WP534".)

Glycolysis and Gluconeogenesis edit

== Enzyme regulation ==
This protein may use the morpheein model of allosteric regulation.

== See also ==
- Lipoic acid
