= List of MeSH codes (D05) =

The following is a partial list of the "D" codes for Medical Subject Headings (MeSH), as defined by the United States National Library of Medicine (NLM).

This list continues the information at List of MeSH codes (D04). Codes following these are found at List of MeSH codes (D06). For other MeSH codes, see List of MeSH codes.

The source for this content is the MeSH Browser from the NLM.

== MeSH D05 – macromolecular substances ==
=== MeSH D05.500 – multiprotein complexes ===
==== MeSH D05.500.117 – axin signaling complex ====
- MeSH D05.500.117.249 – adenomatous polyposis coli protein
- MeSH D05.500.117.500 – axin protein
- MeSH D05.500.117.750 – casein kinase i
- MeSH D05.500.117.750.100 – casein kinase ialpha
- MeSH D05.500.117.750.200 – casein kinase idelta
- MeSH D05.500.117.750.300 – casein kinase 1 epsilon
- MeSH D05.500.117.875 – glycogen synthase kinase 3
- MeSH D05.500.117.875.500 – glycogen synthase kinase 3 beta

==== MeSH D05.500.199 – endosomal sorting complexes required for transport ====
- MeSH D05.500.199.500 – nedd4 ubiquitin protein ligases
- MeSH D05.500.199.501 – tsg101 protein

==== MeSH D05.500.337 – mechanistic target of rapamycin complex 1 ====
- MeSH D05.500.337.250 – mtor associated protein, lst8 homolog
- MeSH D05.500.337.500 – regulatory-associated protein of mtor

==== MeSH D05.500.356 – mechanistic target of rapamycin complex 2 ====
- MeSH D05.500.356.500 – rapamycin-insensitive companion of mtor protein

==== MeSH D05.500.374 – mediator complex ====
- MeSH D05.500.374.249 – cyclin c
- MeSH D05.500.374.500 – cyclin-dependent kinase 8
- MeSH D05.500.374.750 – mediator complex subunit 1

==== MeSH D05.500.562 – multienzyme complexes ====
- MeSH D05.500.562.249 – electron transport complex i
- MeSH D05.500.562.374 – electron transport complex iv
- MeSH D05.500.562.405 – exosome multienzyme ribonuclease complex
- MeSH D05.500.562.444 – fatty acid synthase, type ii
- MeSH D05.500.562.452 – glycine decarboxylase complex
- MeSH D05.500.562.452.100 – aminomethyltransferase
- MeSH D05.500.562.452.150 – dihydrolipoamide dehydrogenase
- MeSH D05.500.562.452.175 – glycine decarboxylase complex h-protein
- MeSH D05.500.562.452.200 – glycine dehydrogenase (decarboxylating)
- MeSH D05.500.562.468 – ketoglutarate dehydrogenase complex
- MeSH D05.500.562.468.500 – dihydrolipoamide dehydrogenase
- MeSH D05.500.562.484 – phosphoenolpyruvate sugar phosphotransferase system
- MeSH D05.500.562.488 – photosynthetic reaction center complex proteins
- MeSH D05.500.562.488.374 – cytochrome b6f complex
- MeSH D05.500.562.488.374.500 – cytochromes b6
- MeSH D05.500.562.488.374.750 – cytochromes f
- MeSH D05.500.562.488.374.875 – plastoquinol-plastocyanin reductase
- MeSH D05.500.562.488.490 – light-harvesting protein complexes
- MeSH D05.500.562.488.490.249 – chlorophyll binding proteins
- MeSH D05.500.562.488.490.500 – phycobilisomes
- MeSH D05.500.562.488.490.500.500 – phycobiliproteins
- MeSH D05.500.562.488.490.500.500.755 – phycocyanin
- MeSH D05.500.562.488.490.500.500.777 – phycoerythrin
- MeSH D05.500.562.488.500 – photosystem i protein complex
- MeSH D05.500.562.488.750 – photosystem ii protein complex
- MeSH D05.500.562.500 – proteasome endopeptidase complex
- MeSH D05.500.562.625 – pyruvate dehydrogenase complex
- MeSH D05.500.562.625.500 – dihydrolipoamide dehydrogenase
- MeSH D05.500.562.625.750 – dihydrolipoyllysine-residue acetyltransferase
- MeSH D05.500.562.625.875 – pyruvate dehydrogenase (lipoamide)
- MeSH D05.500.562.688 – replisomes
- MeSH D05.500.562.750 – succinate cytochrome c oxidoreductase
- MeSH D05.500.562.750.249 – electron transport complex ii
- MeSH D05.500.562.750.249.500 – succinate dehydrogenase
- MeSH D05.500.562.750.500 – electron transport complex iii
- MeSH D05.500.562.875 – sucrase-isomaltase complex

==== MeSH D05.500.781 – polycomb-group proteins ====
- MeSH D05.500.781.100 – polycomb repressive complex 1
- MeSH D05.500.781.750 – polycomb repressive complex 2
- MeSH D05.500.781.750.250 – enhancer of zeste homolog 2 protein
- MeSH D05.500.781.750.500 – retinoblastoma-binding protein 4
- MeSH D05.500.781.750.750 – retinoblastoma-binding protein 7

==== MeSH D05.500.890 – protein translocation systems ====
- MeSH D05.500.890.500 – bacterial secretion systems
- MeSH D05.500.890.500.500 – type i secretion systems
- MeSH D05.500.890.500.750 – type ii secretion systems
- MeSH D05.500.890.500.875 – type iii secretion systems
- MeSH D05.500.890.500.937 – type iv secretion systems
- MeSH D05.500.890.500.968 – type v secretion systems
- MeSH D05.500.890.500.984 – type vi secretion systems
- MeSH D05.500.890.500.992 – type vii secretion systems
- MeSH D05.500.890.563 – mitochondrial precursor protein import complex proteins
- MeSH D05.500.890.625 – sec translocation channels
- MeSH D05.500.890.750 – twin-arginine-translocation system

==== MeSH D05.500.945 – troponin ====
- MeSH D05.500.945.900 – troponin c
- MeSH D05.500.945.925 – troponin i
- MeSH D05.500.945.962 – troponin t

=== MeSH D05.750 – polymers ===
==== MeSH D05.750.078 – biopolymers ====
- MeSH D05.750.078.139 – chitin
- MeSH D05.750.078.139.500 – chitosan
- MeSH D05.750.078.280 – collagen
- MeSH D05.750.078.280.300 – fibrillar collagens
- MeSH D05.750.078.280.300.100 – collagen type i
- MeSH D05.750.078.280.300.100.500 – collagen type i, alpha 1 chain
- MeSH D05.750.078.280.300.200 – collagen type ii
- MeSH D05.750.078.280.300.300 – collagen type iii
- MeSH D05.750.078.280.300.400 – collagen type v
- MeSH D05.750.078.280.300.500 – collagen type xi
- MeSH D05.750.078.421 – elastin
- MeSH D05.750.078.421.500 – elastin-like polypeptides
- MeSH D05.750.078.562 – glucans
- MeSH D05.750.078.562.180 – cellulose
- MeSH D05.750.078.562.180.200 – cellulose, oxidized
- MeSH D05.750.078.562.180.357 – hypromellose derivatives
- MeSH D05.750.078.562.180.515 – lignin
- MeSH D05.750.078.562.272 – dextrans
- MeSH D05.750.078.562.388 – glycogen
- MeSH D05.750.078.562.388.518 – liver glycogen
- MeSH D05.750.078.562.622 – icodextrin
- MeSH D05.750.078.562.855 – starch
- MeSH D05.750.078.562.855.375 – dextrins
- MeSH D05.750.078.562.855.750 – inulin
- MeSH D05.750.078.562.855.875 – resistant starch
- MeSH D05.750.078.593 – intermediate filament proteins
- MeSH D05.750.078.593.200 – desmin
- MeSH D05.750.078.593.400 – glial fibrillary acidic protein
- MeSH D05.750.078.593.450 – keratins
- MeSH D05.750.078.593.450.074 – beta-keratins
- MeSH D05.750.078.593.450.149 – keratins, hair-specific
- MeSH D05.750.078.593.450.300 – keratins, type i
- MeSH D05.750.078.593.450.300.100 – keratin-10
- MeSH D05.750.078.593.450.300.200 – keratin-12
- MeSH D05.750.078.593.450.300.300 – keratin-13
- MeSH D05.750.078.593.450.300.400 – keratin-14
- MeSH D05.750.078.593.450.300.600 – keratin-16
- MeSH D05.750.078.593.450.300.700 – keratin-17
- MeSH D05.750.078.593.450.300.800 – keratin-18
- MeSH D05.750.078.593.450.300.900 – keratin-19
- MeSH D05.750.078.593.450.300.950 – keratin-20
- MeSH D05.750.078.593.450.600 – keratins, type ii
- MeSH D05.750.078.593.450.600.100 – keratin-1
- MeSH D05.750.078.593.450.600.200 – keratin-2
- MeSH D05.750.078.593.450.600.300 – keratin-3
- MeSH D05.750.078.593.450.600.400 – keratin-4
- MeSH D05.750.078.593.450.600.500 – keratin-5
- MeSH D05.750.078.593.450.600.600 – keratin-6
- MeSH D05.750.078.593.450.600.700 – keratin-7
- MeSH D05.750.078.593.450.600.800 – keratin-8
- MeSH D05.750.078.593.450.600.900 – keratin-9
- MeSH D05.750.078.593.540 – nestin
- MeSH D05.750.078.593.630 – neurofilament proteins
- MeSH D05.750.078.593.765 – peripherins
- MeSH D05.750.078.593.900 – vimentin
- MeSH D05.750.078.625 – latex
- MeSH D05.750.078.687 – lignin
- MeSH D05.750.078.730 – microfilament proteins
- MeSH D05.750.078.730.032 – actin capping proteins
- MeSH D05.750.078.730.032.500 – capz actin capping protein
- MeSH D05.750.078.730.032.750 – tropomodulin
- MeSH D05.750.078.730.212 – actin depolymerizing factors
- MeSH D05.750.078.730.212.500 – cofilin 1
- MeSH D05.750.078.730.212.750 – cofilin 2
- MeSH D05.750.078.730.212.875 – destrin
- MeSH D05.750.078.730.246 – actin-related protein 2-3 complex
- MeSH D05.750.078.730.246.500 – actin-related protein 2
- MeSH D05.750.078.730.246.750 – actin-related protein 3
- MeSH D05.750.078.730.248 – actinin
- MeSH D05.750.078.730.250 – actins
- MeSH D05.750.078.730.266 – calponins
- MeSH D05.750.078.730.281 – cortactin
- MeSH D05.750.078.730.315 – filamins
- MeSH D05.750.078.730.333 – formins
- MeSH D05.750.078.730.350 – gelsolin
- MeSH D05.750.078.730.475 – myosins
- MeSH D05.750.078.730.475.100 – myosin heavy chains
- MeSH D05.750.078.730.475.200 – myosin light chains
- MeSH D05.750.078.730.475.300 – myosin subfragments
- MeSH D05.750.078.730.475.470 – myosin type i
- MeSH D05.750.078.730.475.475 – myosin type ii
- MeSH D05.750.078.730.475.475.124 – cardiac myosins
- MeSH D05.750.078.730.475.475.124.249 – atrial myosins
- MeSH D05.750.078.730.475.475.124.500 – ventricular myosins
- MeSH D05.750.078.730.475.475.249 – nonmuscle myosin type iia
- MeSH D05.750.078.730.475.475.500 – nonmuscle myosin type iib
- MeSH D05.750.078.730.475.475.750 – skeletal muscle myosins
- MeSH D05.750.078.730.475.475.875 – smooth muscle myosins
- MeSH D05.750.078.730.475.612 – myosin type iii
- MeSH D05.750.078.730.475.681 – myosin type iv
- MeSH D05.750.078.730.475.750 – myosin type v
- MeSH D05.750.078.730.475.875 – myosin viia
- MeSH D05.750.078.730.556 – myristoylated alanine-rich c kinase substrate
- MeSH D05.750.078.730.597 – neurabins
- MeSH D05.750.078.730.637 – profilins
- MeSH D05.750.078.730.678 – thymosin beta(4)
- MeSH D05.750.078.730.719 – tensins
- MeSH D05.750.078.730.800 – tropomyosin
- MeSH D05.750.078.730.825 – troponin
- MeSH D05.750.078.730.825.900 – troponin c
- MeSH D05.750.078.730.825.925 – troponin i
- MeSH D05.750.078.730.825.962 – troponin t
- MeSH D05.750.078.730.912 – wiskott-aldrich syndrome protein family
- MeSH D05.750.078.730.912.500 – wiskott-aldrich syndrome protein
- MeSH D05.750.078.730.912.550 – wiskott-aldrich syndrome protein, neuronal
- MeSH D05.750.078.734 – microtubule proteins
- MeSH D05.750.078.734.800 – tubulin
- MeSH D05.750.078.738 – pectins
- MeSH D05.750.078.738.500 – rhamnogalacturonans
- MeSH D05.750.078.739 – plant gums
- MeSH D05.750.078.739.249 – chewing gum
- MeSH D05.750.078.739.249.500 – nicotine chewing gum
- MeSH D05.750.078.739.500 – gum arabic
- MeSH D05.750.078.739.625 – karaya gum
- MeSH D05.750.078.739.750 – tragacanth
- MeSH D05.750.078.764 – plant mucilage
- MeSH D05.750.078.789 – polyhydroxyalkanoates
- MeSH D05.750.078.789.500 – polyhydroxybutyrates
- MeSH D05.750.078.840 – resins, plant
- MeSH D05.750.078.840.109 – amber
- MeSH D05.750.078.840.219 – balsams
- MeSH D05.750.078.840.490 – frankincense
- MeSH D05.750.078.840.762 – propolis
- MeSH D05.750.078.850 – reticulin
- MeSH D05.750.078.875 – silk
- MeSH D05.750.078.875.500 – fibroins
- MeSH D05.750.078.875.750 – sericins
- MeSH D05.750.078.937 – tannins
- MeSH D05.750.078.937.214 – hydrolyzable tannins
- MeSH D05.750.078.937.429 – proanthocyanidins

==== MeSH D05.750.219 – nanogels ====
- MeSH D05.750.219.500 – hydrogel, polyethylene glycol dimethacrylate

==== MeSH D05.750.227 – polycarbonates ====
- MeSH D05.750.227.500 – polycarboxylate cement

==== MeSH D05.750.230 – polyelectrolytes ====
- MeSH D05.750.230.001 – polyoxometalates

==== MeSH D05.750.259 – cyanoacrylates ====
- MeSH D05.750.259.341 – enbucrilate
- MeSH D05.750.259.341.110 – bucrylate

==== MeSH D05.750.395 – fluorocarbon polymers ====
- MeSH D05.750.395.616 – polytetrafluoroethylene
- MeSH D05.750.395.616.755 – proplast

==== MeSH D05.750.716 – plastics ====
- MeSH D05.750.716.195 – biodegradable plastics
- MeSH D05.750.716.294 – microplastics
- MeSH D05.750.716.392 – nylons
- MeSH D05.750.716.507 – polyethylenes
- MeSH D05.750.716.507.500 – polyethylene
- MeSH D05.750.716.507.600 – polyethyleneimine
- MeSH D05.750.716.550 – polypropylenes
- MeSH D05.750.716.579 – polystyrenes
- MeSH D05.750.716.579.159 – cholestyramine resin
- MeSH D05.750.716.650 – polyurethanes
- MeSH D05.750.716.721 – polyvinyls
- MeSH D05.750.716.721.616 – polyvinyl alcohol
- MeSH D05.750.716.721.812 – polyvinyl chloride
- MeSH D05.750.716.721.838 – povidone
- MeSH D05.750.716.721.838.745 – povidone-iodine
- MeSH D05.750.716.822 – resins, synthetic
- MeSH D05.750.716.822.111 – acrylic resins
- MeSH D05.750.716.822.111.001 – polyacrylamides
- MeSH D05.750.716.822.111.650 – polymethacrylic acids
- MeSH D05.750.716.822.111.650.605 – methylmethacrylates
- MeSH D05.750.716.822.111.650.605.450 – methylmethacrylate
- MeSH D05.750.716.822.111.650.605.500 – polymethyl methacrylate
- MeSH D05.750.716.822.111.650.750 – polyhydroxyethyl methacrylate
- MeSH D05.750.716.822.300 – bone cements
- MeSH D05.750.716.822.308 – composite resins
- MeSH D05.750.716.822.308.200 – bisphenol a-glycidyl methacrylate
- MeSH D05.750.716.822.308.300 – compomers
- MeSH D05.750.716.822.461 – epoxy resins
- MeSH D05.750.716.822.461.500 – silorane resins
- MeSH D05.750.716.822.730 – resin cements

==== MeSH D05.750.728 – polyesters ====
- MeSH D05.750.728.700 – polydioxanone
- MeSH D05.750.728.764 – polyethylene terephthalates
- MeSH D05.750.728.772 – polyglactin 910
- MeSH D05.750.728.780 – polyglycolic acid
- MeSH D05.750.728.780.500 – polylactic acid-polyglycolic acid copolymer
- MeSH D05.750.728.890 – polyhydroxyalkanoates
- MeSH D05.750.728.890.500 – polyhydroxybutyrates

==== MeSH D05.750.741 – polyethylene glycols ====
- MeSH D05.750.741.125 – certolizumab pegol
- MeSH D05.750.741.250 – cetomacrogol
- MeSH D05.750.741.485 – hydrogel, polyethylene glycol dimethacrylate
- MeSH D05.750.741.575 – nonoxynol
- MeSH D05.750.741.610 – octoxynol
- MeSH D05.750.741.630 – polidocanol
- MeSH D05.750.741.650 – poloxalene
- MeSH D05.750.741.667 – poloxamer
- MeSH D05.750.741.685 – polyhydroxyethyl methacrylate
- MeSH D05.750.741.700 – polysorbates

==== MeSH D05.750.900 – siloxanes ====
- MeSH D05.750.900.850 – silicones
- MeSH D05.750.900.850.150 – dimethylpolysiloxanes
- MeSH D05.750.900.850.150.750 – simethicone
- MeSH D05.750.900.850.900 – silicone elastomers
- MeSH D05.750.900.850.905 – silicone gels
- MeSH D05.750.900.850.950 – silicone oils
- MeSH D05.750.900.925 – silorane resins

=== MeSH D05.937 – smart materials ===
==== MeSH D05.937.500 – stimuli responsive polymers ====
The list continues at List of MeSH codes (D06).
