= List of MeSH codes (D06) =

The following is a partial list of the "D" codes for Medical Subject Headings (MeSH), as defined by the United States National Library of Medicine (NLM).

This list continues the information at List of MeSH codes (D05). Codes following these are found at List of MeSH codes (D08). For other MeSH codes, see List of MeSH codes.

The source for this content is the MeSH Browser from the NLM.

== MeSH D06 – hormones, hormone substitutes, and hormone antagonists ==
=== MeSH D06.347 – hormone antagonists ===
==== MeSH D06.347.065 – androgen antagonists ====
- MeSH D06.347.065.249 – androgen receptor antagonists
- MeSH D06.347.065.500 – nonsteroidal anti-androgens

==== MeSH D06.347.295 – estrogen antagonists ====
- MeSH D06.347.295.500 – estrogen receptor antagonists

==== MeSH D06.347.360 – estrogen receptor modulators ====
- MeSH D06.347.360.827 – selective estrogen receptor modulators

=== MeSH D06.472 – hormones ===
==== MeSH D06.472.040 – adrenal cortex hormones ====
- MeSH D06.472.040.502 – 17-ketosteroids
- MeSH D06.472.040.502.112 – androstenedione
- MeSH D06.472.040.502.195 – androsterone
- MeSH D06.472.040.502.400 – dehydroepiandrosterone
- MeSH D06.472.040.502.400.300 – dehydroepiandrosterone sulfate
- MeSH D06.472.040.502.497 – estrone
- MeSH D06.472.040.502.583 – etiocholanolone
- MeSH D06.472.040.543 – glucocorticoids
- MeSH D06.472.040.585 – hydroxycorticosteroids
- MeSH D06.472.040.585.353 – 11-hydroxycorticosteroids
- MeSH D06.472.040.585.353.118 – aldosterone
- MeSH D06.472.040.585.353.237 – corticosterone
- MeSH D06.472.040.585.353.476 – hydrocortisone
- MeSH D06.472.040.585.353.500 – 18-hydroxycorticosterone
- MeSH D06.472.040.585.353.825 – tetrahydrocortisol
- MeSH D06.472.040.585.478 – 17-hydroxycorticosteroids
- MeSH D06.472.040.585.478.195 – cortisone
- MeSH D06.472.040.585.478.225 – cortodoxone
- MeSH D06.472.040.585.478.392 – hydrocortisone
- MeSH D06.472.040.585.478.782 – tetrahydrocortisol
- MeSH D06.472.040.585.478.865 – tetrahydrocortisone
- MeSH D06.472.040.585.611 – desoxycorticosterone
- MeSH D06.472.040.585.611.400 – 18-hydroxydesoxycorticosterone
- MeSH D06.472.040.585.611.700 – desoxycorticosterone acetate
- MeSH D06.472.040.585.745 – pregnenolone
- MeSH D06.472.040.585.745.500 – 17-alpha-hydroxypregnenolone

==== MeSH D06.472.317 – gastrointestinal hormones ====
- MeSH D06.472.317.152 – cholecystokinin
- MeSH D06.472.317.152.700 – sincalide
- MeSH D06.472.317.350 – epidermal growth factor
- MeSH D06.472.317.400 – gastric inhibitory polypeptide
- MeSH D06.472.317.400.001 – tirzepatide
- MeSH D06.472.317.410 – gastrin-releasing peptide
- MeSH D06.472.317.413 – gastrins
- MeSH D06.472.317.413.593 – pentagastrin
- MeSH D06.472.317.413.800 – tetragastrin
- MeSH D06.472.317.525 – motilin
- MeSH D06.472.317.662 – peptide yy
- MeSH D06.472.317.680 – proglucagon
- MeSH D06.472.317.680.249 – glicentin
- MeSH D06.472.317.680.500 – glucagon-like peptides
- MeSH D06.472.317.680.500.500 – glucagon-like peptide 1
- MeSH D06.472.317.680.500.500.500 – liraglutide
- MeSH D06.472.317.680.500.750 – glucagon-like peptide 2
- MeSH D06.472.317.680.500.751 – semaglutide
- MeSH D06.472.317.680.750 – oxyntomodulin
- MeSH D06.472.317.800 – secretin
- MeSH D06.472.317.950 – vasoactive intestinal peptide

==== MeSH D06.472.334 – gonadal hormones ====
- MeSH D06.472.334.500 – activins
- MeSH D06.472.334.500.500 – inhibin-beta subunits
- MeSH D06.472.334.734 – corpus luteum hormones
- MeSH D06.472.334.734.623 – progesterone
- MeSH D06.472.334.734.769 – relaxin
- MeSH D06.472.334.851 – gonadal steroid hormones
- MeSH D06.472.334.851.437 – estradiol congeners
- MeSH D06.472.334.851.437.249 – equilenin
- MeSH D06.472.334.851.437.374 – equilin
- MeSH D06.472.334.851.437.500 – estradiol
- MeSH D06.472.334.851.437.500.500 – fulvestrant
- MeSH D06.472.334.851.437.500.750 – 2-methoxyestradiol
- MeSH D06.472.334.851.437.750 – estriol
- MeSH D06.472.334.851.437.750.320 – estetrol
- MeSH D06.472.334.851.437.968 – estrogenic steroids, alkylated
- MeSH D06.472.334.851.437.968.500 – ethinyl estradiol
- MeSH D06.472.334.851.437.968.500.250 – ethinyl estradiol-norgestrel combination
- MeSH D06.472.334.851.437.968.500.500 – mestranol
- MeSH D06.472.334.851.437.968.500.750 – quinestrol
- MeSH D06.472.334.851.437.984 – estrogens, catechol
- MeSH D06.472.334.851.437.984.350 – hydroxyestrones
- MeSH D06.472.334.851.437.988 – estrogens, conjugated (usp)
- MeSH D06.472.334.851.437.994 – estrogens, esterified (usp)
- MeSH D06.472.334.851.437.996 – estrone
- MeSH D06.472.334.851.687 – progesterone congeners
- MeSH D06.472.334.851.687.500 – pregnenolone
- MeSH D06.472.334.851.687.500.500 – 17-alpha-hydroxypregnenolone
- MeSH D06.472.334.851.687.750 – progesterone
- MeSH D06.472.334.851.687.750.070 – 5-alpha-dihydroprogesterone
- MeSH D06.472.334.851.687.750.074 – 20-alpha-dihydroprogesterone
- MeSH D06.472.334.851.687.750.478 – hydroxyprogesterones
- MeSH D06.472.334.851.687.750.478.400 – 17-alpha-hydroxyprogesterone
- MeSH D06.472.334.851.687.750.478.400.250 – 17 alpha-hydroxyprogesterone caproate
- MeSH D06.472.334.851.687.750.478.400.500 – pregnanetriol
- MeSH D06.472.334.851.687.750.739 – pregnanediol
- MeSH D06.472.334.851.968 – testosterone congeners
- MeSH D06.472.334.851.968.250 – anabolic androgenic steroids
- MeSH D06.472.334.851.968.500 – androstane-3,17-diol
- MeSH D06.472.334.851.968.750 – androstenediol
- MeSH D06.472.334.851.968.875 – androstenedione
- MeSH D06.472.334.851.968.937 – androsterone
- MeSH D06.472.334.851.968.952 – dehydroepiandrosterone
- MeSH D06.472.334.851.968.952.300 – dehydroepiandrosterone sulfate
- MeSH D06.472.334.851.968.964 – dihydrotestosterone
- MeSH D06.472.334.851.968.968 – etiocholanolone
- MeSH D06.472.334.851.968.976 – nandrolone
- MeSH D06.472.334.851.968.976.500 – nandrolone decanoate
- MeSH D06.472.334.851.968.984 – testosterone
- MeSH D06.472.334.851.968.984.500 – epitestosterone
- MeSH D06.472.334.851.968.984.750 – testosterone propionate
- MeSH D06.472.334.968 – inhibins
- MeSH D06.472.334.968.500 – inhibin-beta subunits
- MeSH D06.472.334.984 – testicular hormones
- MeSH D06.472.334.984.500 – anti-mullerian hormone

==== MeSH D06.472.445 – invertebrate hormones ====
- MeSH D06.472.445.573 – insect hormones
- MeSH D06.472.445.573.271 – ecdysteroids
- MeSH D06.472.445.573.271.500 – ecdysone
- MeSH D06.472.445.573.271.750 – ecdysterone
- MeSH D06.472.445.573.666 – juvenile hormones
- MeSH D06.472.445.573.666.170 – diflubenzuron
- MeSH D06.472.445.573.666.500 – methoprene

==== MeSH D06.472.699 – peptide hormones ====
- MeSH D06.472.699.009 – activins
- MeSH D06.472.699.009.500 – inhibin-beta subunits
- MeSH D06.472.699.042 – adipokines
- MeSH D06.472.699.042.249 – adiponectin
- MeSH D06.472.699.042.375 – fibrillin-1
- MeSH D06.472.699.042.500 – leptin
- MeSH D06.472.699.042.750 – resistin
- MeSH D06.472.699.042.875 – zn-alpha-2-glycoprotein
- MeSH D06.472.699.077 – adrenomedullin
- MeSH D06.472.699.094 – angiotensins
- MeSH D06.472.699.094.075 – angiotensin i
- MeSH D06.472.699.094.078 – angiotensin ii
- MeSH D06.472.699.094.080 – angiotensin iii
- MeSH D06.472.699.100 – bombesin
- MeSH D06.472.699.150 – calcitonin
- MeSH D06.472.699.150.500 – procalcitonin
- MeSH D06.472.699.275 – gastric inhibitory polypeptide
- MeSH D06.472.699.275.001 – tirzepatide
- MeSH D06.472.699.280 – gastrins
- MeSH D06.472.699.301 – ghrelin
- MeSH D06.472.699.322 – gonadotropins
- MeSH D06.472.699.322.326 – chorionic gonadotropin
- MeSH D06.472.699.322.326.125 – chorionic gonadotropin, beta subunit, human
- MeSH D06.472.699.322.326.562 – glycoprotein hormones, alpha subunit
- MeSH D06.472.699.322.451 – gonadotropins, equine
- MeSH D06.472.699.322.576 – gonadotropins, pituitary
- MeSH D06.472.699.322.576.288 – follicle stimulating hormone
- MeSH D06.472.699.322.576.288.500 – follicle stimulating hormone, beta subunit
- MeSH D06.472.699.322.576.288.750 – glycoprotein hormones, alpha subunit
- MeSH D06.472.699.322.576.463 – luteinizing hormone
- MeSH D06.472.699.322.576.463.249 – glycoprotein hormones, alpha subunit
- MeSH D06.472.699.322.576.463.500 – luteinizing hormone, beta subunit
- MeSH D06.472.699.322.576.583 – menotropins
- MeSH D06.472.699.322.576.583.500 – urofollitropin
- MeSH D06.472.699.322.576.773 – prolactin
- MeSH D06.472.699.327 – hypothalamic hormones
- MeSH D06.472.699.327.700 – pituitary hormone release inhibiting hormones
- MeSH D06.472.699.327.700.500 – msh release-inhibiting hormone
- MeSH D06.472.699.327.700.750 – prolactin release-inhibiting factors
- MeSH D06.472.699.327.700.875 – somatostatin
- MeSH D06.472.699.327.700.875.500 – somatostatin-28
- MeSH D06.472.699.327.740 – pituitary hormone-releasing hormones
- MeSH D06.472.699.327.740.140 – corticotropin-releasing hormone
- MeSH D06.472.699.327.740.320 – gonadotropin-releasing hormone
- MeSH D06.472.699.327.740.320.100 – buserelin
- MeSH D06.472.699.327.740.320.340 – goserelin
- MeSH D06.472.699.327.740.320.400 – leuprolide
- MeSH D06.472.699.327.740.320.580 – nafarelin
- MeSH D06.472.699.327.740.320.790 – triptorelin pamoate
- MeSH D06.472.699.327.740.860 – growth hormone-releasing hormone
- MeSH D06.472.699.327.740.860.780 – sermorelin
- MeSH D06.472.699.327.740.880 – thyrotropin-releasing hormone
- MeSH D06.472.699.327.935 – pro-opiomelanocortin
- MeSH D06.472.699.327.935.119 – alpha-endorphin
- MeSH D06.472.699.327.935.179 – alpha-msh
- MeSH D06.472.699.327.935.239 – beta-endorphin
- MeSH D06.472.699.327.935.480 – beta-lipotropin
- MeSH D06.472.699.327.935.498 – corticotropin-like intermediate lobe peptide
- MeSH D06.472.699.327.935.505 – gamma-endorphin
- MeSH D06.472.699.327.935.518 – gamma-lipotropin
- MeSH D06.472.699.327.935.524 – gamma-msh
- MeSH D06.472.699.327.935.531 – melanocortins
- MeSH D06.472.699.327.935.531.500 – adrenocorticotropic hormone
- MeSH D06.472.699.327.935.531.500.200 – cosyntropin
- MeSH D06.472.699.327.935.531.750 – melanocyte-stimulating hormones
- MeSH D06.472.699.327.935.531.750.050 – alpha-msh
- MeSH D06.472.699.327.935.531.750.075 – beta-msh
- MeSH D06.472.699.327.935.531.750.115 – gamma-msh
- MeSH D06.472.699.327.967 – prolactin-releasing hormone
- MeSH D06.472.699.337 – inhibins
- MeSH D06.472.699.337.500 – inhibin-beta subunits
- MeSH D06.472.699.500 – motilin
- MeSH D06.472.699.584 – natriuretic peptides
- MeSH D06.472.699.584.500 – atrial natriuretic factor
- MeSH D06.472.699.584.625 – natriuretic peptide, brain
- MeSH D06.472.699.584.750 – natriuretic peptide, c-type
- MeSH D06.472.699.587 – pancreatic hormones
- MeSH D06.472.699.587.200 – insulins
- MeSH D06.472.699.587.200.200 – biphasic insulins
- MeSH D06.472.699.587.200.300 – insulin, long-acting
- MeSH D06.472.699.587.200.300.050 – insulin detemir
- MeSH D06.472.699.587.200.300.100 – insulin glargine
- MeSH D06.472.699.587.200.300.200 – insulin, isophane
- MeSH D06.472.699.587.200.300.200.500 – isophane insulin, human
- MeSH D06.472.699.587.200.300.300 – insulin, lente
- MeSH D06.472.699.587.200.300.800 – insulin, ultralente
- MeSH D06.472.699.587.200.400 – insulin, short-acting
- MeSH D06.472.699.587.200.400.100 – insulin aspart
- MeSH D06.472.699.587.200.400.500 – insulin lispro
- MeSH D06.472.699.587.200.500 – proinsulin
- MeSH D06.472.699.587.200.500.250 – c-peptide
- MeSH D06.472.699.587.200.500.625 – insulin
- MeSH D06.472.699.587.200.500.625.500 – insulin, regular, human
- MeSH D06.472.699.587.200.500.625.500.500 – isophane insulin, human
- MeSH D06.472.699.587.200.500.625.700 – insulin, regular, pork
- MeSH D06.472.699.587.334 – islet amyloid polypeptide
- MeSH D06.472.699.587.700 – pancreatic polypeptide
- MeSH D06.472.699.587.730 – proglucagon
- MeSH D06.472.699.587.730.500 – glucagon
- MeSH D06.472.699.587.780 – somatostatin
- MeSH D06.472.699.587.780.500 – somatostatin-28
- MeSH D06.472.699.590 – parathyroid hormone
- MeSH D06.472.699.590.850 – teriparatide
- MeSH D06.472.699.591 – parathyroid hormone-related protein
- MeSH D06.472.699.592 – peptide phi
- MeSH D06.472.699.595 – peptide yy
- MeSH D06.472.699.631 – pituitary hormones
- MeSH D06.472.699.631.525 – pituitary hormones, anterior
- MeSH D06.472.699.631.525.343 – gonadotropins, pituitary
- MeSH D06.472.699.631.525.343.288 – follicle stimulating hormone
- MeSH D06.472.699.631.525.343.288.500 – follicle stimulating hormone, beta subunit
- MeSH D06.472.699.631.525.343.288.625 – follicle stimulating hormone, human
- MeSH D06.472.699.631.525.343.288.750 – glycoprotein hormones, alpha subunit
- MeSH D06.472.699.631.525.343.463 – luteinizing hormone
- MeSH D06.472.699.631.525.343.463.249 – glycoprotein hormones, alpha subunit
- MeSH D06.472.699.631.525.343.463.500 – luteinizing hormone, beta subunit
- MeSH D06.472.699.631.525.343.583 – menotropins
- MeSH D06.472.699.631.525.343.583.500 – urofollitropin
- MeSH D06.472.699.631.525.425 – growth hormone
- MeSH D06.472.699.631.525.425.875 – human growth hormone
- MeSH D06.472.699.631.525.525 – prolactin
- MeSH D06.472.699.631.525.600 – pro-opiomelanocortin
- MeSH D06.472.699.631.525.600.119 – alpha-endorphin
- MeSH D06.472.699.631.525.600.179 – alpha-msh
- MeSH D06.472.699.631.525.600.239 – beta-endorphin
- MeSH D06.472.699.631.525.600.480 – beta-lipotropin
- MeSH D06.472.699.631.525.600.498 – corticotropin-like intermediate lobe peptide
- MeSH D06.472.699.631.525.600.505 – gamma-endorphin
- MeSH D06.472.699.631.525.600.518 – gamma-lipotropin
- MeSH D06.472.699.631.525.600.524 – gamma-msh
- MeSH D06.472.699.631.525.600.531 – melanocortins
- MeSH D06.472.699.631.525.600.531.500 – adrenocorticotropic hormone
- MeSH D06.472.699.631.525.600.531.500.200 – cosyntropin
- MeSH D06.472.699.631.525.600.531.750 – melanocyte-stimulating hormones
- MeSH D06.472.699.631.525.600.531.750.050 – alpha-msh
- MeSH D06.472.699.631.525.600.531.750.075 – beta-msh
- MeSH D06.472.699.631.525.600.531.750.115 – gamma-msh
- MeSH D06.472.699.631.525.883 – thyrotropin
- MeSH D06.472.699.631.525.883.249 – glycoprotein hormones, alpha subunit
- MeSH D06.472.699.631.525.883.374 – thyrotropin alfa
- MeSH D06.472.699.631.525.883.500 – thyrotropin, beta subunit
- MeSH D06.472.699.631.692 – pituitary hormones, posterior
- MeSH D06.472.699.631.692.433 – oxytocin
- MeSH D06.472.699.631.692.781 – vasopressins
- MeSH D06.472.699.631.692.781.100 – arginine vasopressin
- MeSH D06.472.699.631.692.781.100.250 – deamino arginine vasopressin
- MeSH D06.472.699.631.692.781.400 – lypressin
- MeSH D06.472.699.631.692.781.400.350 – felypressin
- MeSH D06.472.699.631.692.781.400.675 – terlipressin
- MeSH D06.472.699.631.692.781.700 – ornipressin
- MeSH D06.472.699.631.692.881 – vasotocin
- MeSH D06.472.699.649 – placental hormones
- MeSH D06.472.699.649.367 – chorionic gonadotropin
- MeSH D06.472.699.649.367.125 – chorionic gonadotropin, beta subunit, human
- MeSH D06.472.699.649.367.562 – glycoprotein hormones, alpha subunit
- MeSH D06.472.699.649.451 – gonadotropins, equine
- MeSH D06.472.699.649.692 – placental lactogen
- MeSH D06.472.699.682 – progranulins
- MeSH D06.472.699.682.500 – granulins
- MeSH D06.472.699.715 – relaxin
- MeSH D06.472.699.810 – secretin
- MeSH D06.472.699.857 – urocortins
- MeSH D06.472.699.905 – urotensins
- MeSH D06.472.699.952 – vasoactive intestinal peptide

==== MeSH D06.472.910 – thymus hormones ====
- MeSH D06.472.910.750 – thymic factor, circulating
- MeSH D06.472.910.800 – thymopoietins
- MeSH D06.472.910.800.850 – thymopentin
- MeSH D06.472.910.850 – thymosin
- MeSH D06.472.910.850.001 – thymosin beta(4)
- MeSH D06.472.910.850.500 – thymalfasin

==== MeSH D06.472.931 – thyroid hormones ====
- MeSH D06.472.931.052 – calcitonin
- MeSH D06.472.931.103 – dextrothyroxine
- MeSH D06.472.931.208 – diiodotyrosine
- MeSH D06.472.931.388 – monoiodotyrosine
- MeSH D06.472.931.669 – thyroid (usp)
- MeSH D06.472.931.740 – thyronines
- MeSH D06.472.931.740.180 – diiodothyronines
- MeSH D06.472.931.740.385 – triiodothyronine
- MeSH D06.472.931.740.590 – triiodothyronine, reverse
- MeSH D06.472.931.812 – thyroxine

The list continues at List of MeSH codes (D08).
