= ADF-H domain =

Cofilin_ADF
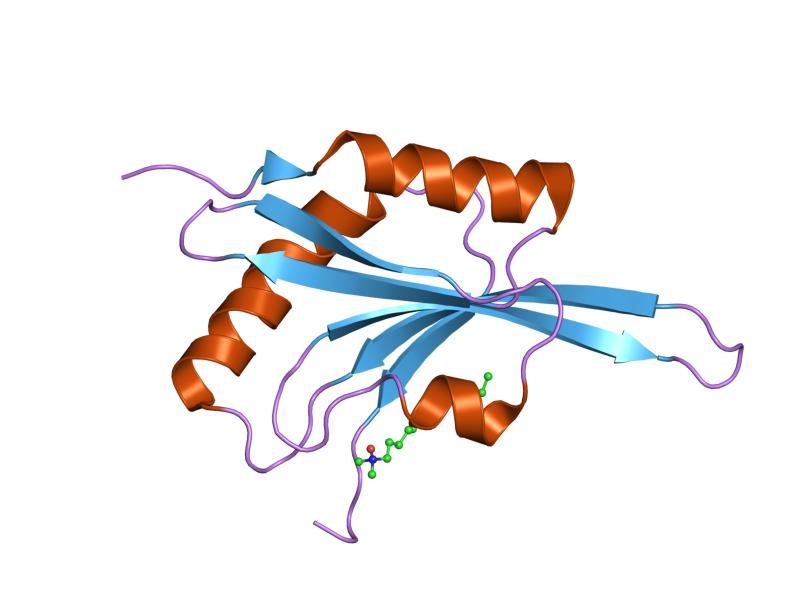
- crystal structure of adf1 from arabidopsis thaliana

Identifiers
- Symbol: Cofilin_ADF
- Pfam: PF00241
- Pfam clan: CL0092
- InterPro: IPR002108
- SMART: ADF
- PROSITE: PDOC00297
- SCOP2: 2prf / SCOPe / SUPFAM
- CDD: cd00013
Available protein structures:
- Pfam: structures / ECOD
- PDB: RCSB PDB; PDBe; PDBj
- PDBsum: structure summary

In molecular biology, ADF-H domain (actin-depolymerising factor homology domain) is an approximately 150 amino acid motif that is present in three phylogenetically distinct classes of eukaryotic actin-binding proteins.

- ADF/cofilins, which include ADF, cofilin, destrin, actophorin, coactosin, depactin and glia maturation factors (GMFs) beta and gamma. ADF/cofilins are small actin-binding proteins composed of a single ADF-H domain. They bind both actin-monomers and filaments and promote rapid filament turnover in cells by depolymerising/fragmenting actin filaments. ADF/cofilins bind ADP-actin with higher affinity than ATP-actin and inhibit the spontaneous nucleotide exchange on actin monomers
- Twinfilins, which are actin monomer-binding proteins that are composed of two ADF-H domains
- Abp1/Drebrins, which are relatively large proteins composed of an N-terminal ADF-H domain followed by a variable region and a C-terminal SH3 domain. Abp1/Drebrins interact only with actin filaments and do not promote filament depolymerisation or fragmentation. Although these proteins are biochemically distinct and play different roles in actin dynamics, they all appear to use the ADF-H domain for their interactions with actin.

The ADF-H domain consists of a six-stranded mixed beta-sheet in which the four central strands (beta2-beta5) are anti-parallel and the two edge strands (beta1 and beta6) run parallel with the neighbouring strands. The sheet is surrounded by two alpha-helices on each side .
