= MiR-134 =

Family of microRNA precursors

miR-134
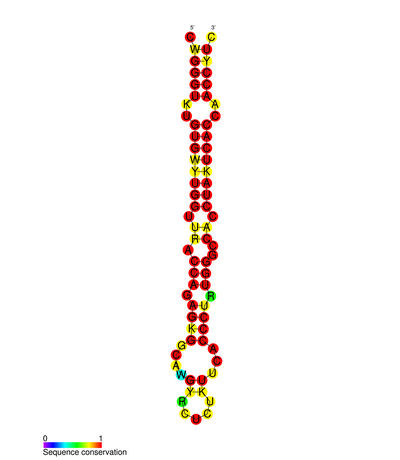
- Conserved secondary structure of miR-134

Identifiers
- Symbol: mir-134
- Alt. Symbols: MIR134
- Rfam: RF00699
- miRBase: MI0000474
- miRBase family: MIPF0000112
- NCBI Gene: 406924
- HGNC: 31519

Other data
- Domain(s): Mammalia
- GO: 0035195
- SO: 0001244
- Locus: Chr. 14
- PDB structures: PDBe

miR-134 is a family of microRNA precursors found in mammals, including humans. MicroRNAs are typically transcribed as ~70 nucleotide precursors and subsequently processed by the Dicer enzyme to give a ~22 nucleotide product. The excised region or, mature product, of the miR-134 precursor is the microRNA mir-134.

miR-134 was one of a number of microRNAs found to be increasingly expressed in schizophrenia.

== Functions ==
miR-134 is a brain-specific microRNA; in rats it is localised specifically in hippocampal neurons and may indirectly regulate synaptic development through antisense pairing with LIMK1 mRNA. In the human brain, SIRT1 is thought to mediate CREB protein through miR-134, giving the microRNA a role in higher brain functions such a memory formation.

miR-134 has also been reported to function in mouse embryonic stem cells as part of a complex network regulating their differentiation.

== Applications ==
miR-134 levels in circulating blood could potentially be used as a peripheral biomarker for bipolar disorder.
