= List of human blood components =

Compound	Comments	In whole blood (g/cm^{3})	In plasma or serum (g/cm^{3})
Water	Solvent	0.81-0.86	0.93-0.95
Acetoacetate	Produced in liver	8-40 ×10^{−7}	4-43 ×10^{−7}
Acetone	product of bodyfat breakdown	3-20 ×10^{−6}	
Acetylcholine	Neurotransmitter of the parasympathetic nervous system	6.6-8.2 ×10^{−8}	
Adenosine triphosphate	Energy storage		
Adenosine triphosphate	total	3.1-5.7 ×10^{−4}	
Adenosine triphosphate	phosphorus	5-10 ×10^{−5}	
Adrenocorticotrophic hormone	Stimulates the adrenal cortex		2.5-12 ×10^{−11}
Adrenocorticotrophic hormone	@ 6AM, mean		5.5 ×10^{−11}
Adrenocorticotrophic hormone	@ 6AM, maximum		12 ×10^{−11}
Adrenocorticotrophic hormone	@ 6PM, mean		3.5 ×10^{−11}
Adrenocorticotrophic hormone	@ 6PM, maximum		<7.5 ×10^{−11}
Alanine	Amino acid	2.7-5.5 ×10^{−5}	2.4-7.6 ×10^{−5}
Albumin	Blood plasma protein		3.5-5.0 ×10^{−2}
Aluminum		1-40 ×10^{−8}	1-88 ×10^{−8}
Selenium		60–150 ng/mL	
Aldosterone	Regulates electrolyte balance		
Aldosterone	supine		3-10 ×10^{−11}
Aldosterone	standing, male		6-22 ×10^{−11}
Aldosterone	standing, female		5-30 ×10^{−11}
Amino acids	Protein building blocks		
Amino acids	total	3.8-5.3 ×10^{−4}	
Amino acids	nitrogen	4.6-6.8 ×10^{−5}	3.0-5.5 ×10^{−5}
alpha-Aminobutyric acid		1-2 ×10^{−6}	1-2 ×10^{−6}
δ-Aminolevulinic acid			1.5-2.3 ×10^{−7}
Ammonia		1-2 ×10^{−6}	1.0-4.9 ×10^{−7}
cAMP	Intracellular signal transduction molecule		
cAMP	male		5.6-10.9 ×10^{−9}
cAMP	female		3.6-8.9 ×10^{−9}
Androstenedione	Steroid hormone		
Androstenedione	male >18 yrs		2-30 ×10^{−10}
Androstenedione	female >18 yrs		8-30 ×10^{−10}
Androsterone	Steroid hormone		1.5 ×10^{−7}
Angiotensin I	Angiotensin II precursor		1.1-8.8 ×10^{−11}
Angiotensin II	Vasoconstrictor		1.2-3.6 ×10^{−11}
Alpha 1-antitrypsin	Serine protease inhibitor		7.8-20 ×10^{−4}
Arginine	Amino acid	6-17 ×10^{−6}	1.3-3.6 ×10^{−5}
Arsenic	normal range	2-62 ×10^{−9}	
Arsenic	chronic poisoning	100-500 ×10^{−9}	
Arsenic	acute poisoning	600-9300 ×10^{−9}	
Ascorbic acid (Vitamin C)	Important vitamin	1-15 ×10^{−6}	6-20 ×10^{−6}
Aspartic acid	Amino acid		0-3 ×10^{−6}
Aspartic acid	In WBCs	2.5-4.0 ×10^{−4}	9-12 ×10^{−6}
Bicarbonate	Buffer in blood		5-5.7 ×10^{−4}
Bile acids	Digestive function, bilirubin excretion	2-30 ×10^{−6}	3-30 ×10^{−6}
Bilirubin	Hemoglobin metabolite	2-14 ×10^{−6}	1-10 ×10^{−6}
Biotin (Vitamin H)	Gluconeogenesis, metabolize leucine, fatty acid synthesis	7-17 ×10^{−9}	9-16 ×10^{−9}
Blood Urea Nitrogen (BUN)			8-23 ×10^{−5}
Bradykinin			7 ×10^{−11}
Bromide			7-10 ×10^{−9}
Cadmium	normal	1-5 ×10^{−9}	
Cadmium	toxic	0.1-3 ×10^{−6}	
Calciferol (vitamin D_{2})	Maintain calcium and phosphorus levels		1.7-4.1 ×10^{−8}
Calcitonin (CT)	Hormone		<1.0 ×10^{−10}
Calcium	Bones, Ca^{2+}		
Calcium	ionized	4.48-4.92 ×10^{−5}	4.25-5.25 ×10^{−5}
Calcium	total		8.4-11.5 ×10^{−5}
Carbon dioxide	Respiratory gas		
Carbon dioxide	arterial	8.8-10.8 ×10^{−4}	3.0-7.9 ×10^{−5}
Carbon dioxide	venous	9.8-11.8 ×10^{−4}	3.3-8.3 ×10^{−5}
Carboxyhemoglobin(as HbCO)	nonsmokers	0.5-1.5% total Hb	
Carboxyhemoglobin(as HbCO)	smokers, 1-2 packs/day	4-5% total Hb	
Carboxyhemoglobin(as HbCO)	smokers, 2 packs/day	8-9% total Hb	
Carboxyhemoglobin(as HbCO)	toxic	>20% total Hb	
Carboxyhemoglobin(as HbCO)	lethal	>50% total Hb	
Carcinoembryonic antigen			<2.5 ×10^{−9}
beta-Carotene	Vitamin A dimer		3-25 ×10^{−7}
Carotenoids	Antioxidant	2.4-23.1 ×10^{−7}	
Cephalin		3-11.5 ×10^{−4}	0-1 ×10^{−4}
Ceruloplasmin			1.5-6 ×10^{−4}
Chloride, as NaCl		4.5-5 ×10^{−3}	3.5-3.8 ×10^{−3}
Cholecalciferol (Vitamin D3)	1, 25-dihydroxy		2.5-4.5 ×10^{−11}
Cholecalciferol (Vitamin D3)	24,25-dihydroxy		1.5 ×10^{−9}
Cholecalciferol (Vitamin D3)	25-hydroxy		1.4-8 ×10^{−8}
Cholecystokinin (pancreozymin)	Stimulates fat and protein digestion		6.04 ×10^{−11}
Cholesterol	Steroid lipid		
Cholesterol	LDLC		0.5-2.0 ×10^{−3}
Cholesterol	HDLC		2.9-9.0 ×10^{−4}
Cholesterol	total	1.15-2.25 ×10^{−3}	1.2-2 ×10^{−3}
Choline, total		1.1-3.1 ×10^{−4}	3.6-3.5 ×10^{−4}
Chorionic gonadotropin	Progesterone secretion during pregnancy		
Chorionic gonadotropin	Menstrual		0-3 ×10^{−11}
Chorionic gonadotropin	Pregnancy, 1st trimester		5-3300 ×10^{−10}
Chorionic gonadotropin	Pregnancy, 2nd trimester		20-1000 ×10^{−10}
Chorionic gonadotropin	Pregnancy, 3rd trimester		20-50 ×10^{−10}
Chorionic gonadotropin	Menopausal		3-30 ×10^{−11}
Citric acid		1.3-2.5 ×10^{−5}	1.6-3.2 ×10^{−5}
Citrulline			2-10 ×10^{−6}
Coagulation Factors	Fibrinogen	1.2-1.6 ×10^{−3}	2-4 ×10^{−3}
Coagulation Factors	Prothrombin		1 ×10^{−4}
Coagulation Factors	Tissue thromboplastin		1 ×10^{−6}
Coagulation Factors	Proaccelerin		5-12 ×10^{−6}
Coagulation Factors	Proconvertin		1 ×10^{−6}
Coagulation Factors	Antihemophilic factor		1 ×10^{−7}
Coagulation Factors	Christmas factor		4 ×10^{−6}
Coagulation Factors	Stuart factor		5 ×10^{−6}
Coagulation Factors	Plasma thrmb. anteced.		4 ×10^{−6}
Coagulation Factors	Hageman factor		2.9 ×10^{−5}
Coagulation Factors	Fibrin-stabilizing factor		1 ×10^{−5}
Coagulation Factors	Fibrin split products		<1 ×10^{−5}
Coagulation Factors	Fletcher factor		5 ×10^{−5}
Coagulation Factors	Fitzgerald factor		7 ×10^{−5}
Coagulation Factors	von Willebrand factor		7 ×10^{−6}
Cobalamin (Vitamin B_{12})	Needed for nerve cells, red blood cells, and to make DNA	6-14 ×10^{−10}	1-10 ×10^{−10}
Cocarboxylase			7-9 ×10^{−8}
Complement system	C1q		5.8-7.2 ×10^{−5}
Complement system	C1r		2.5-3.8 ×10^{−5}
Complement system	C1s (C1 esterase)		2.5-3.8 ×10^{−5}
Complement system	C2		2.2-3.4 ×10^{−5}
Complement system	C3( b1C-globulin)		8-15.5 ×10^{−4}
Complement system	factor B (C3 proactivator)		2-4.5 ×10^{−4}
Complement system	C4 (b1E-globulin)		1.3-3.7 ×10^{−4}
Complement system	C4 binding protein		1.8-3.2 ×10^{−4}
Complement system	C5 (b1F-globulin)		5.1-7.7 ×10^{−5}
Complement system	C6		4.8-6.4 ×10^{−5}
Complement system	C7		4.9-7 ×10^{−5}
Complement system	C8		4.3-6.3 ×10^{−5}
Complement system	C9		4.7-6.9 ×10^{−5}
Complement system	Properdin		2.4-3.2 ×10^{−5}
Compound S			1-3 ×10^{−9}
Copper		9-15 ×10^{−7}	
Copper	male		7-14 ×10^{−7}
Copper	female		8-15.5 ×10^{−7}
Corticosteroids	Steroid hormones		1-4 ×10^{−6}
Corticosterone			4-20 ×10^{−9}
Cortisol	Inhibits CRH secretion		3-23 ×10^{−8}
Cortisol	8 AM		6-23 ×10^{−8}
Cortisol	4 PM		3-15 ×10^{−8}
Cortisol	10 PM		~50% of 8 AM value
C-peptide	fasting		0.5-2.0 ×10^{−9}
C-peptide	maximum		4 ×10^{−9}
C-reactive protein	Plasma protein		6.8-820 ×10^{−8}
Creatine	Assists muscle cell energy supply		
Creatine	male		1.7-5.0 ×10^{−6}
Creatine	female		3.5-9.3 ×10^{−6}
Creatinine	male		0.8-1.5 ×10^{−5}
Creatinine	female		0.7-1.2 ×10^{−5}
Cyanide	nonsmokers		4 ×10^{−9}
Cyanide	smokers		6 ×10^{−9}
Cyanide	nitroprusside therapy		10-60 ×10^{−9}
Cyanide	toxic		>100 ×10^{−9}
Cyanide	lethal		>1000 ×10^{−9}
Cysteine	Amino acid	6-12 ×10^{−6}	1.8-5 ×10^{−5}
Dehydroepiandrosterone(DHEA)	Steroid hormone		
Dehydroepiandrosterone(DHEA)	aged 1–4 yrs		0.2-0.4 ×10^{−9}
Dehydroepiandrosterone(DHEA)	aged 4–8 yrs		0.1-1.9 ×10^{−9}
Dehydroepiandrosterone(DHEA)	aged 8–10 yrs		0.2-2.9 ×10^{−9}
Dehydroepiandrosterone(DHEA)	aged 10–12 yrs		0.5-9.2 ×10^{−9}
Dehydroepiandrosterone(DHEA)	aged 12–14 yrs		0.9-20 ×10^{−9}
Dehydroepiandrosterone(DHEA)	aged 14–16 yrs		2.5-20 ×10^{−9}
Dehydroepiandrosterone(DHEA)	male		0.8-10 ×10^{−9}
Dehydroepiandrosterone(DHEA)	female, premenopausal		2.0-15 ×10^{−9}
DHEA sulfate	male		1.99-3.34 ×10^{−6}
DHEA sulfate	female		
DHEA sulfate	newborn		1.67-3.64 ×10^{−6}
DHEA sulfate	pre-pubertal children		1.0-6.0 ×10^{−7}
DHEA sulfate	premenopausal		8.2-33.8 ×10^{−7}
DHEA sulfate	pregnancy		2.3-11.7 ×10^{−7}
DHEA sulfate	postmenopausal		1.1-6.1 ×10^{−7}
11-Deoxycortisol			1-7 ×10^{−8}
Dihydrotestosterone (DHT)	male		3-8 ×10^{−9}
Dihydrotestosterone (DHT)	female		1-10 ×10^{−10}
Diphosphoglycerate (phosphate)		8-16 ×10^{−5}	
DNA	The molecule of heredity		0-1.6 ×10^{−5}
Dopamine	Neurotransmitter		<1.36 ×10^{−10}
Enzymes, total			<6 ×10^{−5}
Epidermal growth factor (EGF)			<1 ×10^{−11}
Epinephrine	Neurotransmitter of the sympathetic nervous system		
Epinephrine	after 15 min rest		3.1-9.5 ×10^{−11}
Epinephrine	when emitted	3.8 ×10^{−9}	2-2.5 ×10^{−9}
Ergothioneine		1-20 ×10^{−5}	
Erythrocytes (#/cm^{3})	adult male, avg. (range)	5.2 (4.6-6.2) ×10^{9}	
Erythrocytes (#/cm^{3})	adult female, avg. (range)	4.6 (4.2-5.4) ×10^{9}	
Erythrocytes (#/cm^{3})	children, varies with age	4.5-5.1 ×10^{9}	
Erythrocytes (#/cm^{3})	reticulocytes	25-75 ×10^{6}	
Erythropoietin	adult, normal		0.5-2.5 ×10^{−10}
Erythropoietin	pregnant		2.7-6.2 ×10^{−10}
Erythropoietin	hypoxia or anemia		0.8-8.0 ×10^{−8}
Estradiol (E2)	male		8-36 ×10^{−12}
Estradiol (E2)	female, follicular(days 1-10)		1-9 ×10^{−11}
Estradiol (E2)	female, mean		5 ×10^{−11}
Estradiol (E2)	female, pre-fertile (days 10-12)		10-15 ×10^{−11}
Estradiol (E2)	female, fertile (days 12-14)		35-60 ×10^{−11}
Estradiol (E2)	female, luteal (days 15-28)		20-40 ×10^{−11}
Estradiol (E2)	female, pregnancy		3-70 ×10^{−7}
Estradiol (E2)	female, postmenopausal		1-3 ×10^{−11}
Estriol (E3)	nonpregnant		<2 ×10^{−9}
Estriol (E3)	pregnancy, weeks 22-30		3-5 ×10^{−9}
Estriol (E3)	pregnancy, weeks 32-37		6-11 ×10^{−9}
Estriol (E3)	pregnancy, weeks 38-41		25-170 ×10^{−9}
Estrogen	male		4-11.5 ×10^{−11}
Estrogen	female, prepubertal		<4 ×10^{−11}
Estrogen	female, 1–10 days		6.1-39.4 ×10^{−11}
Estrogen	female, 11–20 days		12.2-43.7 ×10^{−11}
Estrogen	female, 21–30 days		15.6-35 ×10^{−11}
Estrogen	female, postmenopausal		<4 ×10^{−11}
Estrone (E1)	male		2.9-17 ×10^{−11}
Estrone (E1)	female, follicular		2-15 ×10^{−11}
Estrone (E1)	female, 1–10 days of cycle		4.3-18 ×10^{−11}
Estrone (E1)	female, 11–20 days of cycle		7.5-19.6 ×10^{−11}
Estrone (E1)	female, 20–29 days of cycle		13.1-20.1 ×10^{−11}
Estrone (E1)	pregnancy, weeks 22-30		3-5 ×10^{−9}
Estrone (E1)	pregnancy, weeks 32-37		5-6 ×10^{−9}
Estrone (E1)	pregnancy, weeks 38-41		7-10 ×10^{−9}
Ethanol	social high		0.5 ×10^{−3}
Ethanol	reduced coordination		0.8 ×10^{−3}
Ethanol	depression of CNS		>1 ×10^{−3}
Ethanol	confusion, falling down		2.0 ×10^{−3}
Ethanol	loss of consciousness		3.0 ×10^{−3}
Ethanol	coma, death		>4 ×10^{−3}
Fatty acids	nonesterified (free)		8-25 ×10^{−5}
Fatty acids	esterified	2.5-3.9 ×10^{−3}	7-20 ×10^{−5}
Fatty acids	total		1.9-4.5 ×10^{−3}
Ferritin	male		1.5-30 ×10^{−8}
Ferritin	female		0.9-18 ×10^{−8}
alpha-1-Fetoprotein			0-2 ×10^{−8}
Flavin adenine dinucleotide			8-12 ×10^{−8}
Fluoride		1-4.5 ×10^{−7}	1-4.5 ×10^{−7}
Folate			2.2-17.3 ×10^{−9}
Folate	in erythrocyte		1.67-7.07 ×10^{−7}
Folic acid		2.3-5.2 ×10^{−8}	1.6-2 ×10^{−8}
Fructose		0-5 ×10^{−5}	7-8 ×10^{−5}
Furosemide glucuronide			1-400 ×10^{−6}
Galactose	children		<2 ×10^{−4}
Gastric inhibitory peptide (GIP)			<1.25-4.0 ×10^{−10}
Gastrin	mean		7 ×10^{−11}
Gastrin	maximum		<20 ×10^{−11}
Globulin			total 2.2-4 ×10^{−2}
Globulin	alpha-1-Globulin		1-4 ×10^{−3}
Globulin	alpha-2-Globulin		4-10 ×10^{−3}
Globulin	beta globulin		5-12 ×10^{−3}
Globulin	gamma globulin		6-17 ×10^{−3}
Glucagon	range		5-15 ×10^{−11}
Glucagon	mean		7.1-7.9 ×10^{−11}
Glucosamine	fetus	4-6 ×10^{−4}	4.2-5.5 ×10^{−4}
Glucosamine	child	5-7 ×10^{−4}	5.2-6.9 ×10^{−4}
Glucosamine	adult	6-8 ×10^{−4}	6.1-8.2 ×10^{−4}
Glucosamine	aged	7-9 ×10^{−4}	7.0-8.9 ×10^{−4}
Glucose	newborn	2-3 ×10^{−4}	
Glucose	adult	6.5-9.5 ×10^{−4}	7-10.5 ×10^{−4}
Glucose	diabetic	14-120 ×10^{−4}	
Glucuronic acid		4.1-9.3 ×10^{−5}	8-11 ×10^{−6}
Glutamic acid			2-28 ×10^{−6}
Glutamine			4.6-10.6 ×10^{−5}
Glutathione	reduced	2.5-4.1 ×10^{−4}	0
Glycerol	free		2.9-17.2 ×10^{−6}
Glycine		1.7-2.3 ×10^{−5}	8-54 ×10^{−6}
Glycogen		1.2-16.2 ×10^{−5}	0
Glycoprotein, acid			4-15 ×10^{−4}
cGMP			0.6-4.4 ×10^{−9}
Gonadotropin-releasing hormone			1-80 ×10^{−12}
Guanidine		1.8-2.3 ×10^{−6}	
Haptoglobin			3-22 ×10^{−4}
Hemoglobin		1.2-1.75 ×10^{−1}	1-4 ×10^{−5}
Hemoglobin	newborn	1.65-1.95 ×10^{−1}	
Hemoglobin	children, varies with age	1.12-1.65 ×10^{−1}	
Hemoglobin	adult, male	1.4-1.8 ×10^{−1}	
Hemoglobin	adult, female	1.2-1.6 ×10^{−1}	
Hemoglobin	inside erythrocyte	~3.3 ×10^{−1}	
Hemoglobin	per red blood cell	27-32 picograms	
Hexosephosphate P		1.4-5 ×10^{−5}	0-2 ×10^{−6}
Histamine		6.7-8.6 ×10^{−8}	
Histidine		9-17 ×10^{−6}	1.1-3.8 ×10^{−5}
Hydrogen ion(pH 7.4)		4 ×10^{−11}	
beta-Hydroxybutyric acid		1-6 ×10^{−6}	1-9 ×10^{−6}
17α-Hydroxycorticosteroids		4-10 ×10^{−8}	
17α-Hydroxyprogesterone	male		20-250 ×10^{−11}
17α-Hydroxyprogesterone	female, follicular		20-80 ×10^{−11}
17α-Hydroxyprogesterone	female, luteal		80-300 ×10^{−11}
17α-Hydroxyprogesterone	female, postmenopausal		4-50 ×10^{−11}
17α-Hydroxyprogesterone	female, child		20-140 ×10^{−11}
Antibodies	Immunoglobulin A (IgA)		5-39 ×10^{−4}
Antibodies	Immunoglobulin D (IgD)		0.5-8.0 ×10^{−5}
Antibodies	Immunoglobulin G (IgG)		5.0-19 ×10^{−3}
Antibodies	Immunoglobulin M (IgM)		3.0-30 ×10^{−4}
Antibodies	Immunoglobulin E (IgE)		<5 ×10^{−7}
Indican			8-50 ×10^{−7}
Inositol			3-7 ×10^{−6}
Insulin			2.0-8.4 ×10^{−10}
Insulin-like growth factor			9.9-50 ×10^{−8}
Iodine	total	2.4-3.2 ×10^{−8}	4.5-14.5 ×10^{−8}
Iron	adult	4-6 ×10^{−4}	6-18 ×10^{−7}
Isoleucine		9-15 ×10^{−6}	1.2-4.2 ×10^{−5}
Ketone bodies		2.3-10 ×10^{−6}	1.5-30 ×10^{−6}
alpha-Ketonic acids	adult	1-30 ×10^{−6}	
L-Lactate	arterial	<11.3 ×10^{−5}	4.5-14.4 ×10^{−5}
L-Lactate	venous	8.1-15.3 ×10^{−5}	4.5-19.8 ×10^{−5}
Lead	normal	1-5 ×10^{−7}	1-7.8 ×10^{−8}
Lead	toxic	>6-10 ×10^{−7}	
Lecithin		1.1-1.2 ×10^{−3}	1-2.25 ×10^{−3}
Leptin		1.2 ×10^{−8}	
Leucine		1.4-2 ×10^{−5}	1.2-5.2 ×10^{−5}
Leukocytes (#/cm^{3}) Total:	total, birth	9.0-30.0 ×10^{6}	
Leukocytes (#/cm^{3}) Total:	total, pediatric	4.5-15.5 ×10^{6}	
Leukocytes (#/cm^{3}) Total:	total, adult, range	4.3-11.0 ×10^{6}	
Leukocytes (#/cm^{3}) Total:	total, adult, median	7.0 ×10^{6}	
Leukocytes (#/cm^{3}) Total:	Neutrophil granulocytes, birth	6.0-26.0 ×10^{6}	
Leukocytes (#/cm^{3}) Total:	Neutrophils, pediatric	1.5-8.5 ×10^{6}	
Leukocytes (#/cm^{3}) Total:	Neutrophils, adult, range	1.83-7.25 ×10^{6}	
Leukocytes (#/cm^{3}) Total:	Neutrophils, adult, median	3.65 ×10^{6}	
Leukocytes (#/cm^{3}) Total:	Eosinophil granulocytes birth	0.4 ×10^{6}	
Leukocytes (#/cm^{3}) Total:	Eosinophils, pediatric	0.2-0.3 ×10^{6}	
Leukocytes (#/cm^{3}) Total:	Eosinophils, adult, range	0.05-0.7 ×10^{6}	
Leukocytes (#/cm^{3}) Total:	Eosinophils, adult, median	0.15 ×10^{6}	
Leukocytes (#/cm^{3}) Total:	Basophil granulocytes, adult, range	0.015-0.15 ×10^{6}	
Leukocytes (#/cm^{3}) Total:	Basophils, adult, median	0.03 ×10^{6}	
Leukocytes (#/cm^{3}) Total:	Lymphocytes, birth	2-11 ×10^{6}	
Leukocytes (#/cm^{3}) Total:	Lymphocyte, pediatric	1.5-8.0 ×10^{6}	
Leukocytes (#/cm^{3}) Total:	Lymphocyte, adult, range	1.5-4.0 ×10^{6}	
Leukocytes (#/cm^{3}) Total:	Lymphocyte, adult, median	2.5 ×10^{6}	
Leukocytes (#/cm^{3}) Total:	Monocytes, birth, range	0.4-3.1 ×10^{6}	
Leukocytes (#/cm^{3}) Total:	Monocytes, birth, median	1.05 ×10^{6}	
Leukocytes (#/cm^{3}) Total:	Monocytes, pediatric	0.4 ×10^{6}	
Leukocytes (#/cm^{3}) Total:	Monocytes, adult, range	0.21-1.05 ×10^{6}	
Leukocytes (#/cm^{3}) Total:	Monocytes, adult, median	0.43 ×10^{6}	
Leukocytes (#/cm^{3}) Total:	Phagocytes, birth, range	6-26 ×10^{6}	
Leukocytes (#/cm^{3}) Total:	Phagocytes, birth, median	11 ×10^{6}	
Leukocytes (#/cm^{3}) Total:	Phagocytes, pediatric, range	1.5-8.5 ×10^{6}	
Leukocytes (#/cm^{3}) Total:	Phagocytes, pediatric, median	4.1 ×10^{6}	
Leukocytes (#/cm^{3}) Total:	Phagocytes, adult, range	3.5-9.2 ×10^{6}	
Leukocytes (#/cm^{3}) Total:	Phagocytes, CD4 cell count	0.5-1.5 ×10^{6}	
Lipase P		1.2-1.4 ×10^{−4}	
Lipids	total	4.45-6.1 ×10^{−3}	4-8.5 ×10^{−3}
Lipoprotein (Sr 12-20)			1-10 ×10^{−4}
Lithium		1.5-2.5 ×10^{−8}	
Lysine		1.3-3 ×10^{−5}	2-5.8 ×10^{−5}
Lysozyme (muramidase)			1-15 ×10^{−6}
alpha 2-macroglobulin	pediatric		2-7 ×10^{−3}
alpha 2-macroglobulin	male, adult		0.9-4.0 ×10^{−3}
alpha 2-macroglobulin	female, adult		1.2-5.4 ×10^{−3}
Magnesium		3.2-5.5 ×10^{−5}	1.8-3.6 ×10^{−5}
Malic acid		4.6 ×10^{−6}	1-9 ×10^{−6}
Manganese		0-2.5 ×10^{−7}	0-1.9 ×10^{−7}
Melatonin	Day		1.35-1.45 ×10^{−11}
Melatonin	Night		6.07-7.13 ×10^{−11}
Mercury	normal	<1 ×10^{−8}	
Mercury	chronic	>20 ×10^{−8}	
Methemoglobin		4-6 ×10^{−4}	
Methionine		4-6 ×10^{−6}	1-15 ×10^{−6}
Methyl guanidine		2-3 ×10^{−6}	
beta-2-microglobulin			8-24 ×10^{−7}
MIP-1a			2.3 ×10^{−11}
MIP-1b			9 ×10^{−11}
Mucopolysaccharides			1.75-2.25 ×10^{−3}
Mucoproteins			8.65-9.6 ×10^{−4}
Nerve growth factor (NGF)			6-10 ×10^{−9}
Niacin		5-8 ×10^{−6}	2-15 ×10^{−7}
Nitrogen	respiratory gas	8.2 ×10^{−6}	9.7 ×10^{−6}
Nitrogen	total, nonrespiratory	3-3.7 ×10^{−2}	
Norepinephrine	Neurotransmitter of the sympathetic nervous system		
Norepinephrine	after 15 min rest		2.15-4.75 ×10^{−10}
Norepinephrine	when emitted	8.1 ×10^{−9}	8.5 ×10^{−9}
Nucleotide	total	3.1-5.2 ×10^{−4}	
Ornithine			4-14 ×10^{−6}
Oxalate			1-2.4 ×10^{−6}
Oxygen (respiratory gas)	arterial	2.4-3.2 ×10^{−4}	3.9 ×10^{−6}
Oxygen (respiratory gas)	venous	1.6-2.3 ×10^{−4}	1.6 ×10^{−6}
Oxytocin	male		2 ×10^{−12}
Oxytocin	female, nonlactating		2 ×10^{−12}
Oxytocin	female, pregnant 33-40 wks		32-48 ×10^{−12}
Pancreatic polypeptide			5-20 ×10^{−11}
Pantothenic acid (vitamin B_{5})		1.5-4.5 ×10^{−7}	6-35 ×10^{−8}
Para-aminobenzoic acid		3-4 ×10^{−8}	
Parathyroid hormone (PTH)			2-4 ×10^{−10}
Pentose	phosphorated		2-2.3 ×10^{−5}
Phenol	free	7-10 ×10^{−7}	
Phenylalanine		8-12 ×10^{−6}	1.1-4 ×10^{−5}
Phospholipid		2.25-2.85 ×10^{−3}	5-12 ×10^{−5}
Phosphatase	acid, prostatic		<3 ×10^{−9}
Phosphorus	inorganic, adult	2-3.9 ×10^{−5}	2.3-4.5 ×10^{−5}
Phosphorus	inorganic, children		4.0-7.0 ×10^{−5}
Phosphorus	total	3.5-4.3 ×10^{−4}	1-1.5 ×10^{−4}
Phytanic acid			<3 ×10^{−6}
Platelets (#/cm^{3}):	range	1.4-4.4 ×10^{8}	
Platelets (#/cm^{3}):	median	2.5 ×10^{8}	
Platelet-derived growth factor			5.0 ×10^{−8}
Polysaccharides	total		7.3-13.1 ×10^{−4}
Potassium		1.6-2.4 ×10^{−3}	1.4-2.2 ×10^{−4}
Pregnenolone			3-20 ×10^{−10}
Progesterone (female)	female, follicular		0.4-0.9 ×10^{−9}
Progesterone (female)	female, midluteal		7.7-12.1 ×10^{−9}
Progesterone (female)	pregnancy, weeks 16-18		30-66 ×10^{−9}
Progesterone (female)	pregnancy, weeks 28-30		70-126 ×10^{−9}
Progesterone (female)	pregnancy, weeks 38-40		131-227 ×10^{−9}
Progesterone (female)	male		12-20 ×10^{−11}
Proinsulin	fasting		0.5-5 ×10^{−10}
Proinsulin	mean		1.42-1.70 ×10^{−10}
Prolactin (male) <20 ×10^{−9}	while awake		1-7 ×10^{−9}
Prolactin (male) <20 ×10^{−9}	during sleep		9-20 ×10^{−9}
Prolactin (female)	follicular		<23 ×10^{−9}
Prolactin (female)	luteal		5-40 ×10^{−9}
Proline			1.2-5.7 ×10^{−5}
Prostaglandins	PGE		3.55-4.15 ×10^{−10}
Prostaglandins	PGF		1.26-1.56 ×10^{−10}
Prostaglandins	15-keto-PGF2a		5 ×10^{−10}
Prostaglandins	15-keto-PGE2		<5 ×10^{−11}
Protein	total	1.9-2.1 ×10^{−1}	6.0-8.3 ×10^{−2}
Protoporphyrin		2.7-6.1 ×10^{−7}	
Prostate specific antigen		0-5 ×10^{−9}	
Pseudoglobulin I			8-19 ×10^{−3}
Pseudoglobulin II			2-8 ×10^{−3}
Purine	total	9.5-11.5 ×10^{−5}	
Pyrimidine nucleotides		2.6-4.6 ×10^{−5}	2-12 ×10^{−7}
Pyridoxine (Vitamin B6)			3.6-90 ×10^{−9}
Pyruvic acid		3-10 ×10^{−6}	3-12 ×10^{−6}
RANTES			7 ×10^{−11}
Relaxin	day <100 preparturition		<2 ×10^{−9}
Relaxin	day 100 to 2 days preceding		5-40 ×10^{−9}
Relaxin	day preceding parturition		100-200 ×10^{−9}
Relaxin	day following parturition		<2 ×10^{−9}
Retinol (Vitamin A)			1-8 ×10^{−7}
Riboflavin (Vitamin B_{2})		1.5-6 ×10^{−7}	2.6-3.7 ×10^{−8}
RNA		5-8 ×10^{−4}	4-6 ×10^{−5}
Secretin			2.9-4.5 ×10^{−11}
Serine			3-20 ×10^{−6}
Serotonin (5-hydroxytryptamine)		1.55-1.81 ×10^{−7}	0.8-2.1 ×10^{−7}
Silicon		1.4-2.95 ×10^{−6}	2.2-5.7 ×10^{−6}
Sodium			3.1-3.4 ×10^{−3}
Solids, total		2-2.5 ×10^{−1}	8-9 ×10^{−2}
Somatotropin	growth hormone		4-140 ×10^{−10}
Sphingomyelin		1.5-1.85 ×10^{−3}	1-4 ×10^{−4}
Succinic acid			5 ×10^{−6}
Sugar, total		7-11 ×10^{−4}	
Sulfates	inorganic		8-12 ×10^{−6}
Sulfur	total	3.8-5 ×10^{−2}	3.1-3.8 ×10^{−2}
Taurine			3-21 ×10^{−6}
Testosterone (male)	free		5.6-10.2 ×10^{−11}
Testosterone (male)	total		275-875 ×10^{−11}
Testosterone (female)	free		0.24-0.38 ×10^{−11}
Testosterone (female)	total		23-75 ×10^{−11}
Testosterone (female)	pregnant		38-190 ×10^{−11}
Thiamine (Vitamin B_{1})		3-10 ×10^{−8}	1-9 ×10^{−8}
Thiocyanate		5-14 ×10^{−6}	
Thiocyanate	nonsmoker		1-4 ×10^{−6}
Thiocyanate	smoker		3-12 ×10^{−6}
Threonine		1.3-2 ×10^{−5}	0.9-3.2 ×10^{−5}
Thyroglobulin (Tg)			<5 ×10^{−8}
Thyroid hormones			4-8 ×10^{−8}
Thyrotropin-releasing hormone			5-60 ×10^{−12}
Thyroxine (FT4)	free		8-24 ×10^{−12}
Thyroxine (FT4)	total		4-12 ×10^{−8}
Thyroxine-binding prealbumin			2.8-3.5 ×10^{−4}
Thyroxine-binding globulin			1.0-3.4 ×10^{−7}
Tin		0-4 ×10^{−7}	0-1 ×10^{−7}
alpha-Tocopherol (Vitamin E)			5-20 ×10^{−6}
Transcortin	male		1.5-2 ×10^{−5}
Transcortin	female		1.6-2.5 ×10^{−5}
Transferrin	newborn		1.3-2.75 ×10^{−3}
Transferrin	adult		2.2-4 ×10^{−3}
Transferrin	age >60 yrs		1.8-3.8 ×10^{−3}
Triglycerides		8.5-23.5 ×10^{−4}	2.5-30 ×10^{−4}
Triiodothyronine	free		2.3-6.6 ×10^{−12}
Triiodothyronine	total (T3)		0.75-2.50 ×10^{−9}
Tryptophan		5-10 ×10^{−6}	9-30 ×10^{−6}
Tyrosine		8-14 ×10^{−6}	4-25 ×10^{−6}
Urea		2-4 ×10^{−4}	1.5-4.7 ×10^{−4}
Uric acid	child		2.0-6.7 ×10^{−5}
Uric acid	adult, male		3.4-7.2 ×10^{−5}
Uric acid	adult, female		2.4-6.1 ×10^{−5}
Valine		2-2.9 ×10^{−5}	1.7-4.2 ×10^{−5}
Vasoactive intestinal peptide (VIP)			6-16 ×10^{−12}
Vasopressin	hydrated		4.5 ×10^{−13}
Vasopressin	dehydrated		3.7 ×10^{−12}
Zinc		5-13 ×10^{−6}	7-15 ×10^{−7}

In blood banking, the fractions of Whole Blood used for transfusion are also called components.

== See also ==
- Reference ranges for common blood tests
