= CFL2 =

CFL2 can refer to:

- Empress North 6 (Plains Midstream Canada) Aerodrome
- CFL2 (gene)
