= HSPH1 =

Protein-coding gene in the species Homo sapiens

Identifiers
- Aliases: HSPH1, HSP105, HSP105A, HSP105B, NY-CO-25, heat shock protein family H (Hsp110) member 1
- External IDs: OMIM: 610703; MGI: 105053; GeneCards: HSPH1

Gene location (Human)
Chr.	Chromosome 13 (human)
Band	13q12.3	Start	31,134,973 bp
Band	13q12.3	End	31,162,388 bp

Gene location (Mouse)
Chr.	Chromosome 5 (mouse)
Band	5 G3|5 89.18 cM	Start	149,537,752 bp
Band	5 G3|5 89.18 cM	End	149,559,841 bp
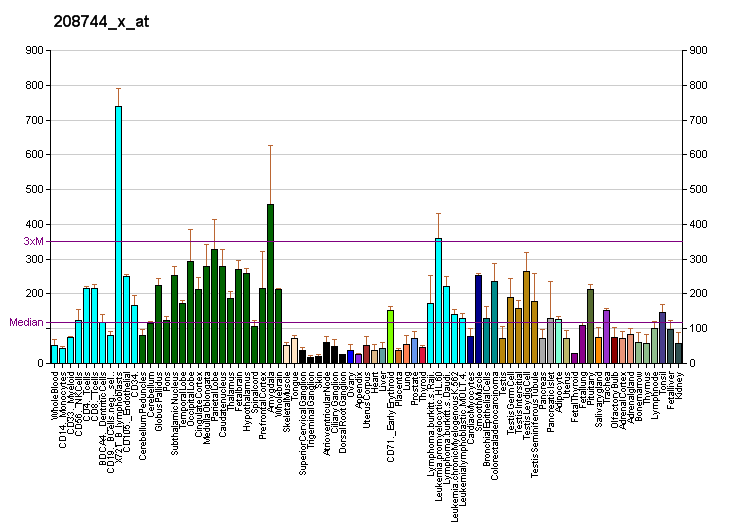

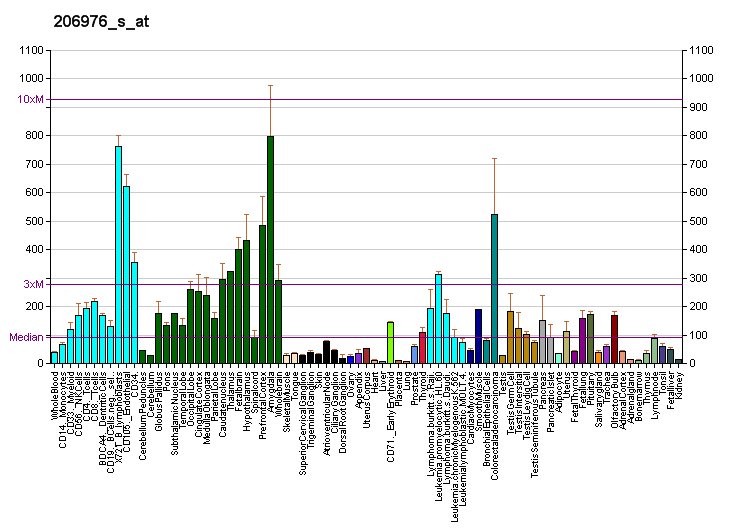
RNA expression pattern
Bgee	Human / Mouse (ortholog); Top expressed in: gonad; bronchial epithelial cell; nucleus accumbens; postcentral gyrus; caudate nucleus; Brodmann area 23; putamen; Region I of hippocampus proper; Brodmann area 9; superior frontal gyrus / Top expressed in: tail of embryo; genital tubercle; primitive streak; barrel cortex; Paneth cell; ventromedial nucleus; facial motor nucleus; arcuate nucleus; utricle; cingulate gyrus; More reference expression data
BioGPS	More reference expression data
Gene ontology
Molecular function	nucleotide binding; alpha-tubulin binding; protein binding; ATP binding; adenyl-nucleotide exchange factor activity
Cellular component	cytoplasm; cytosol; endocytic vesicle lumen; nucleoplasm; extracellular region; microtubule; extracellular exosome; nucleus; protein-containing complex
Biological process	negative regulation of establishment of protein localization to mitochondrion; positive regulation of protein tyrosine kinase activity; negative regulation of p38MAPK cascade; negative regulation of apoptotic signaling pathway; receptor-mediated endocytosis; chaperone cofactor-dependent protein refolding; positive regulation of NK T cell activation; response to unfolded protein; regulation of cellular response to heat; negative regulation of intrinsic apoptotic signaling pathway in response to hydrogen peroxide; positive regulation of MHC class I biosynthetic process; positive regulation of transcription by RNA polymerase II; regulation of catalytic activity
Sources:Amigo / QuickGO
Orthologs
Databases	NCBI: entry; OMA: entry
Species	Human	Mouse
Entrez	10808	15505
Ensembl	ENSG00000120694	ENSMUSG00000029657
UniProt	Q92598	Q61699
RefSeq (mRNA)	NM_001286503; NM_001286504; NM_001286505; NM_006644; NM_001349704	NM_013559; NM_001347534
RefSeq (protein)	NP_001273432; NP_001273433; NP_001273434; NP_006635; NP_001336633	NP_001334463; NP_038587
Location (UCSC)	Chr 13: 31.13 – 31.16 Mb	Chr 5: 149.54 – 149.56 Mb
PubMed search
- Wikidata
View/Edit Human	View/Edit Mouse

Heat shock protein 105 kDa is a protein that in humans is encoded by the HSPH1 gene.

== Interactions ==
HSPH1 has been shown to interact with Cofilin 1.
