= Glia maturation factor =

Neurotrophic factor

glia maturation factor, beta

Identifiers
- Symbol: GMFB
- NCBI gene: 2764
- HGNC: 4373
- OMIM: 601713
- RefSeq: NM_004124
- UniProt: P60983

Other data
- Locus: Chr. 14 q22.1
Search for
- Structures: Swiss-model
- Domains: InterPro

glia maturation factor, gamma

Identifiers
- Symbol: GMFG
- NCBI gene: 9535
- HGNC: 4374
- OMIM: 604104
- RefSeq: NM_004877
- UniProt: O60234

Other data
- Locus: Chr. 19 q13.2
Search for
- Structures: Swiss-model
- Domains: InterPro

Glia maturation factor is a neurotrophic factor implicated in nervous system development, angiogenesis and immune function. In humans, the glia maturation factor beta and glia maturation factor gamma proteins are encoded by the GMFB and GMFG genes, respectively.

The structures of mouse glia maturation factors beta and gamma, solved by both crystallography and NMR, reveal similarities and critical differences with ADF-H (actin depolymerization factor homology) domains and suggest new means of experimentally addressing the function of this protein family.

== See also ==
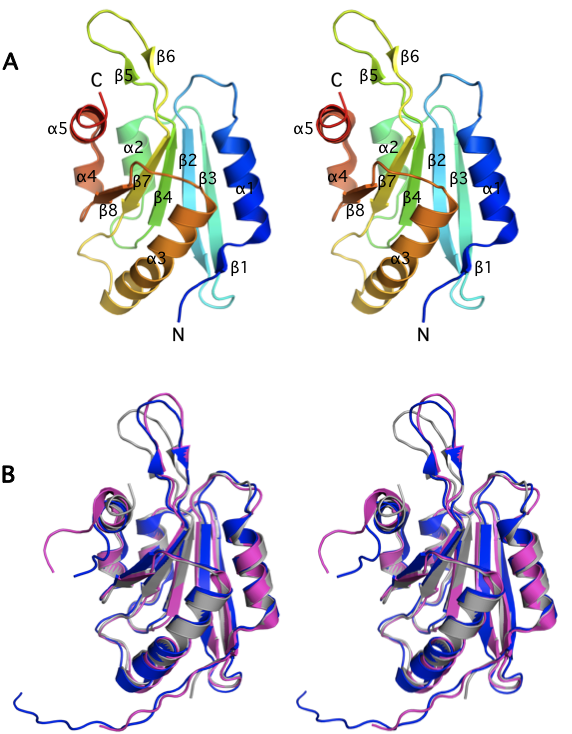
Stereo ribbon diagram of the crystal structure of GMFG. Spectral coloring is from blue (N-terminus) to red (C-terminus). Secondary structural elements are indicated

- Glia+maturation+factor at the U.S. National Library of Medicine Medical Subject Headings (MeSH)
