= Cofilin-2 =

Protein found in humans

CFL2
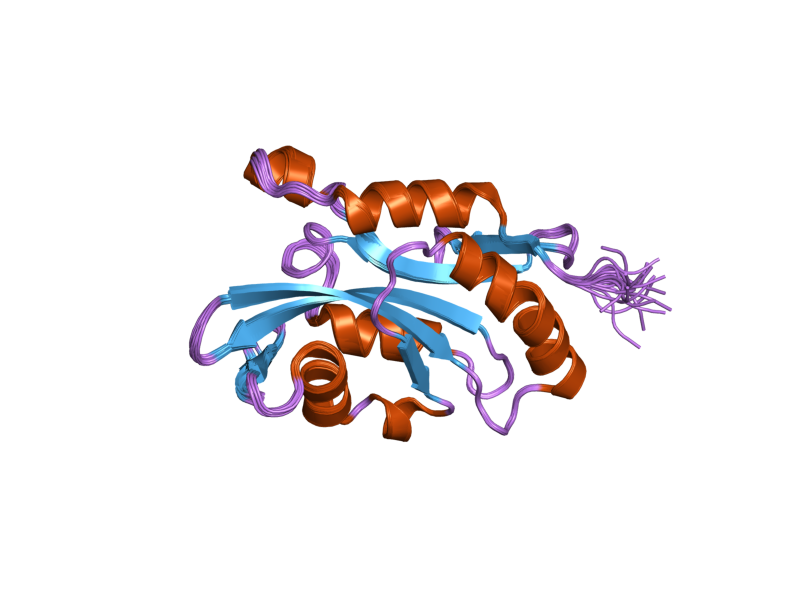

Identifiers
- Aliases: CFL2, NEM7, cofilin 2
- External IDs: OMIM: 601443; MGI: 101763; GeneCards: CFL2

Gene location (Human)
Chr.	Chromosome 14 (human)
Band	14q13.1	Start	34,709,113 bp
Band	14q13.1	End	34,714,823 bp

Gene location (Mouse)
Chr.	Chromosome 12 (mouse)
Band	12|12 C1	Start	54,905,594 bp
Band	12|12 C1	End	54,909,662 bp
RNA expression pattern
Bgee	Human / Mouse (ortholog); Top expressed in: cardiac muscle tissue of right atrium; myocardium of left ventricle; deltoid muscle; tibialis anterior muscle; Skeletal muscle tissue of rectus abdominis; quadriceps femoris muscle; vastus lateralis muscle; biceps brachii; Skeletal muscle tissue of biceps brachii; muscle of thigh / Top expressed in: intercostal muscle; atrioventricular valve; temporal muscle; sternocleidomastoid muscle; vastus lateralis muscle; triceps brachii muscle; ankle; atrium; digastric muscle; muscle of thigh; More reference expression data
BioGPS	n/a
Gene ontology
Molecular function	actin binding; protein binding; actin filament binding
Cellular component	nuclear matrix; cytoplasm; extracellular exosome; intracellular anatomical structure; cytoskeleton; I band; nucleus; actin cytoskeleton; Z discdkac; extracellular space
Biological process	sarcomere organization; muscle cell cellular homeostasis; positive regulation of actin filament depolymerization; actin filament organization; actin filament depolymerization; skeletal muscle tissue development; actin filament fragmentation
Sources:Amigo / QuickGO
Orthologs
Databases	NCBI: entry; OMA: entry
Species	Human	Mouse
Entrez	1073	12632
Ensembl	ENSG00000165410	ENSMUSG00000062929
UniProt	Q9Y281; Q549N0	P45591
RefSeq (mRNA)	NM_001243645; NM_021914; NM_138638	NM_007688
RefSeq (protein)	NP_001230574; NP_068733; NP_619579; NP_068733.1; NP_619579.1	NP_031714
Location (UCSC)	Chr 14: 34.71 – 34.71 Mb	Chr 12: 54.91 – 54.91 Mb
PubMed search
- Wikidata
View/Edit Human	View/Edit Mouse

Cofilin 2 (muscle) also known as CFL2 is a protein which in humans is encoded by the CFL2 gene.

== Function ==
Cofilin is a widely distributed intracellular actin-modulating protein that binds and depolymerizes filamentous F-actin and inhibits the polymerization of monomeric G-actin in a pH-dependent manner. Cofilin-2 is a member of the AC group of proteins that also includes cofilin-1 (CFL1) and destrin (DSTN), all of which regulate actin-filament dynamics. The CFL2 gene encodes a skeletal muscle-specific isoform localized to the thin filaments, where it exerts its effect on actin, in part through interactions with tropomyosins.

== Clinical significance ==
Mutations in the CFL2 gene are associated with nemaline myopathy. Deficiency of cofilin-2 may result in reduced depolymerization of actin filaments, causing their accumulation in nemaline bodies, minicores, and, possibly concentric laminated bodies.
