= Polyacrylamides =

Polyacrylamides is a category of polymers whose monomers are acrylamides. Some important examples are:

- Polyacrylamide, the original homologue
- Poly(N-isopropylacrylamide), i.e. the well-known PNIPAM or PNIPAAm
