= LIMK1 =

Protein-coding gene in the species Homo sapiens

Identifiers
- Aliases: LIMK1, LIMK, LIMK-1, LIM domain kinase 1
- External IDs: OMIM: 601329; MGI: 104572; GeneCards: LIMK1
Available structures
PDB	Ortholog search: PDBe RCSB
PDB	List of PDB id codes 3S95, 5L6W, 5HVK, 5HVJ
Enzyme activity
EC #	BRENDA	ExPASy	KEGG	MetaCyc
2.7.11.1	↗	↗	↗	↗

Gene location (Human)
Chr.	Chromosome 7 (human)
Band	7q11.23	Start	74,082,933 bp
Band	7q11.23	End	74,122,525 bp

Gene location (Mouse)
Chr.	Chromosome 5 (mouse)
Band	5 74.73 cM|5 G2	Start	134,684,893 bp
Band	5 74.73 cM|5 G2	End	134,717,452 bp
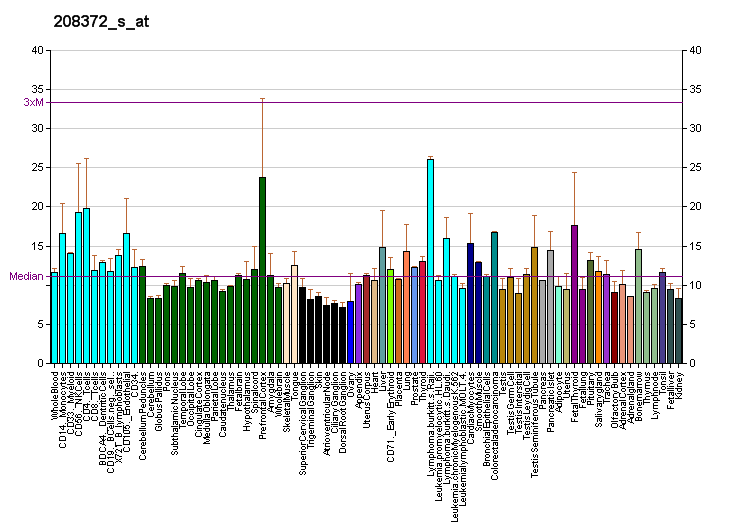

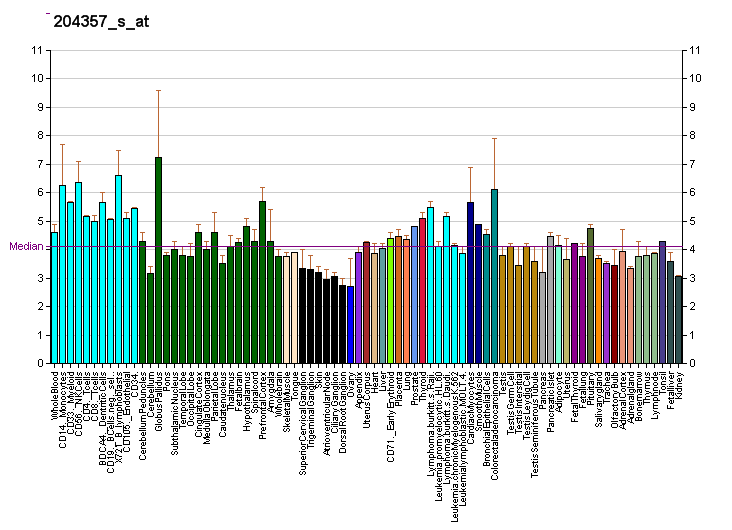
RNA expression pattern
Bgee	Human / Mouse (ortholog); Top expressed in: stromal cell of endometrium; right frontal lobe; cingulate gyrus; anterior cingulate cortex; prefrontal cortex; amygdala; Brodmann area 9; granulocyte; ganglionic eminence; monocyte / Top expressed in: motor neuron; gastrula; internal carotid artery; decidua; substantia nigra; external carotid artery; pontine nuclei; medial vestibular nucleus; anterior horn of spinal cord; supraoptic nucleus; More reference expression data
BioGPS	More reference expression data
Gene ontology
Molecular function	transferase activity; nucleotide binding; heat shock protein binding; metal ion binding; kinase activity; protein binding; protein heterodimerization activity; ATP binding; protein kinase activity; protein serine/threonine kinase activity; signal transducer activity
Cellular component	membrane; focal adhesion; cytoplasm; nucleus; Golgi apparatus; cytosol; nuclear speck; neuron projection; lamellipodium; cell projection
Biological process	Fc-gamma receptor signaling pathway involved in phagocytosis; phosphorylation; nervous system development; negative regulation of ubiquitin-protein transferase activity; Rho protein signal transduction; positive regulation of actin filament bundle assembly; actin cytoskeleton organization; signal transduction; positive regulation of axon extension; protein phosphorylation; positive regulation of stress fiber assembly
Sources:Amigo / QuickGO
Orthologs
Databases	NCBI: entry; OMA: entry
Species	Human	Mouse
Entrez	3984	16885
Ensembl	ENSG00000106683	ENSMUSG00000029674
UniProt	P53667	P53668
RefSeq (mRNA)	NM_016735; NM_001204426; NM_002314	NM_010717; NM_001305875
RefSeq (protein)	NP_001191355; NP_002305	NP_001292804; NP_034847
Location (UCSC)	Chr 7: 74.08 – 74.12 Mb	Chr 5: 134.68 – 134.72 Mb
PubMed search
- Wikidata
View/Edit Human	View/Edit Mouse

LIM domain kinase 1 is an enzyme that in humans is encoded by the LIMK1 gene.

== Function ==
There are approximately 40 known eukaryotic LIM proteins, so named for the LIM domains they contain. LIM domains are highly conserved cysteine-rich structures containing 2 zinc fingers. Although zinc fingers usually function by binding to DNA or RNA, the LIM motif probably mediates protein-protein interactions. LIM kinase-1 and LIM kinase-2 belong to a small subfamily with a unique combination of 2 N-terminal LIM motifs, a central PDZ domain, and a C-terminal protein kinase domain. LIMK1 is likely to be a component of an intracellular signaling pathway and may be involved in brain development.

== Clinical significance ==
LIMK1 hemizygosity is implicated in the impaired visuospatial constructive cognition of Williams syndrome.

== Interactions ==
LIMK1 has been shown to interact with:

- CFL1,
- CDKN1C,
- NRG1,
- PAK1,
- PAK4, and
- YWHAZ.
