= Urofollitropin =

Pharmaceutical drug

Clinical data
- Trade names: Bravelle, Fertinex
- AHFS/Drugs.com: Micromedex Detailed Consumer Information
- Routes of administration: Subcutaneous, intramuscular
- ATC code: G03GA04 (WHO)

Legal status
- Legal status: US: ℞-only

Identifiers
- CAS Number: 97048-13-0
- PubChem CID: 62819
- IUPHAR/BPS: 1157
- DrugBank: DB00094
- ChemSpider: none
- UNII: W9BB98U6HP
- KEGG: D06400
- ChEMBL: ChEMBL1201520
- ECHA InfoCard: 100.212.030

Chemical and physical data
- Formula: C_{975}H_{1513}N_{267}O_{304}S_{26}
- Molar mass: 22672.95 g·mol^{−1}

Urofollitropin is a purified form of follicle-stimulating hormone (FSH) that is manufactured by extraction from human urine and then purified to remove various proteins and other substances. FSH is important in the development of follicles (eggs) produced by the ovaries. Given by subcutaneous injection, it is used in combination with human chorionic gonadotropin (hCG) to assist in ovulation and fertility. It is also used with in vitro fertilization methods. The dosage is adjusted to each individual's response.

The most common side effects are abdominal or pelvic pain, bloating, as well as redness, and pain or swelling at the injection site. Follitropin is possibly associated with increased risk of endometrial carcinoma. It is not for use during pregnancy, as there is evidence for birth defects under follitropin treatment.

Bravelle sold in the United States from March 2014 through October 2015 is subject to a recall and refund by its maker, Ferring Pharmaceuticals, because certain batches of the medicine had a lower strength than stated.
