= ADF/Cofilin family =

Family of actin-binding proteins

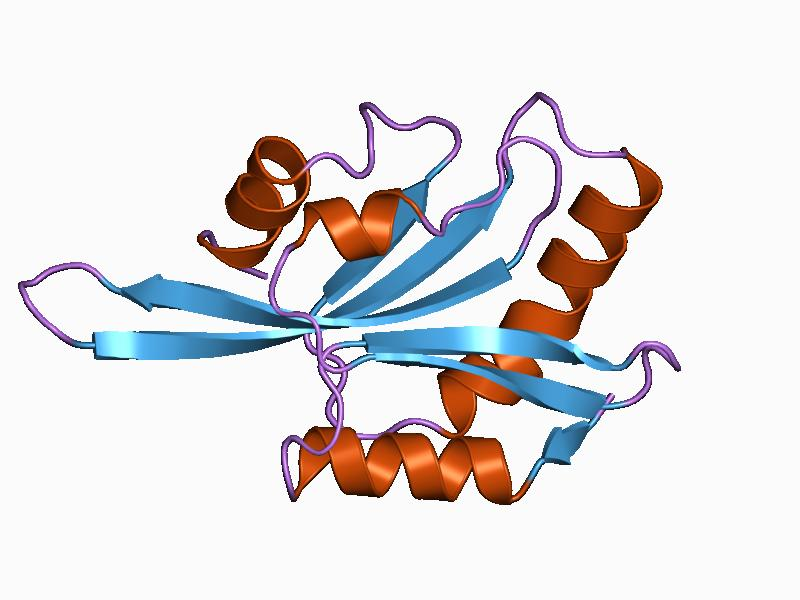
Cartoon representation of a cofilin (actin depolymerizing factor, ADF).

ADF/cofilin is a family of actin-binding proteins associated with the rapid depolymerization of actin microfilaments that give actin its characteristic dynamic instability. This dynamic instability is central to actin's role in muscle contraction, cell motility and transcription regulation.

Three highly conserved and highly (70%-82%) identical genes belonging to this family have been described in humans and mice:

- CFL1, coding for cofilin 1 (non-muscle, or n-cofilin)
- CFL2, coding for cofilin 2 (found in muscle: m-cofilin)
- DSTN, coding for destrin, also known as ADF or actin depolymerizing factor

Actin-binding proteins regulate assembly and disassembly of actin filaments. Cofilin, a member of the ADF/cofilin family is actually a protein with 70% sequence identity to destrin, making it part of the ADF/cofilin family of small ADP-binding proteins. The protein binds to actin monomers and filaments, G actin and F actin, respectively. Cofilin causes depolymerization at the minus end of filaments, thereby preventing their reassembly. The protein is known to sever actin filaments by creating more positive ends on filament fragments. Cofilin/ADF (destrin) is likely to sever F-actin without capping and prefers ADP-actin. These monomers can be recycled by profilin, activating monomers to go back into filament form again by an ADP-to-ATP exchange. ATP-actin is then available for assembly.

== Structure ==
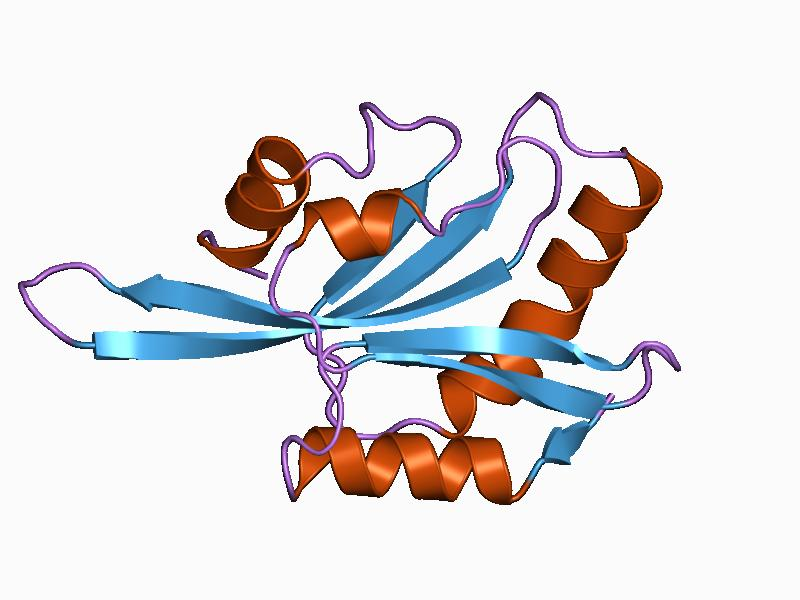
Cofilin-1 protein, a member of the actin depolymerizing factor protein family, isolated in yeast.

The structure of actin depolymerizing factors is highly conserved across many organism due to actin's importance in many cellular processes. Proteins of the actin depolymerizing factor family characteristically consist of five beta sheets, four antiparallel and one parallel, and four alpha helices with a central alpha helix providing the structure and stability of the proteins. The actin depolymerizing factor homology domain (ADF-H domain) allows for binding to actin subunits and includes the central alpha helix, the N-terminus extension, and the C terminus helix.

- The N-terminus extension consists of a tilted loop that facilitates binding to G-actin but not F-actin due to steric hindrance present in F-actin.
- The C-terminus can form hydrogen bonds to F actin through its amide backbone and a serine at position S274. This serine is especially highly evolutionarily conserved due to its importance in actin binding.
- The central alpha helix is inserted into the hydrophobic cleft in between the first and third subunits of actin during actin binding.

Cofilin binds monomeric (G-actin) and filamentous actin (F-actin). Its binding affinities are higher for ADP-actin over ADP-Pi and ATP-actin. Its binding changes the twist of F-actin. The structure of ADF was first characterized in 1980 by James Bamburg. Four actin histidines near the cofilin binding site may be needed for cofilin/actin interaction, but pH sensitivity alone may not be enough of an explanation for the levels of interaction encountered. Cofilin is accommodated in ADP-F actin because of increased flexibility in this form of actin. Binding by both cofilin and ADF (destrin) causes the crossover length of the filament to be reduced. Therefore, strains increase filament dynamics and the level of filament fragmentation observed.

== Function ==
Cofilin is a ubiquitous actin-binding factor required for the reorganization of actin filaments. ADF/Cofilin family members bind G-actin monomers and depolymerize actin filaments through two mechanisms: severing and increasing the off-rate for actin monomers from the pointed end. "Older" ADP/ADP-Pi actin filaments free of tropomyosin and proper pH are required for cofilin to function effectively. In the presence of readily available ATP-G-actin cofilin speeds up actin polymerization via its actin-severing activity (providing free barbed ends for further polymerization and nucleation by the Arp2/3 complex). As a long-lasting in vivo effect, cofilin recycles older ADP-F-actin, helping cell to maintain ATP-G-actin pool for sustained motility. pH, phosphorylation and phosphoinositides regulate cofilin's binding and associating activity with actin

The Arp2/3 complex and cofilin work together to reorganize the actin filaments in the cytoskeleton. Arp 2/3, an actin binding proteins complex, binds to the side of ATP-F-actin near the growing barbed end of the filament, causing nucleation of a new F-actin branch, while cofilin-driven depolymerization takes place after dissociating from the Arp2/3 complex. They also work together to reorganize actin filaments in order to traffic more proteins by vesicle to continue the growth of filaments.

Cofilin also binds with other proteins such as myosin, tropomyosin, α-actinin, gelsolin and scruin. These proteins compete with cofilin for actin binding. Cofilin also play role in innate immune response.

=== In a Model Organism ===
ADF/cofilin is found in ruffling membranes and at the leading edge of mobile cells. In particular, ADF/cofilin promotes disassembly of the filament at the rear of the brush in Xenopus laevis lamellipodia, a protrusion from fibroblast cells characterized by actin networks. Subunits are added to barbed ends and lost from rear-facing pointed ends. Increasing the rate constant, k, for actin dissociation from the pointed ends was found to sever actin filaments. Through this experimentation, it was found that ATP or ADP-Pi are probably involved in binding to actin filaments.

== Mechanism of Action ==
F-actin (filamentous actin) is stabilized when it is bound to ATP due to the presence of a serine on the second subunit of actin that is able to form hydrogen bonds to the last phosphate group in ATP and a nearby histidine attached to the main loop. This interaction stabilizes the structure internally due to the interactions between the main loop and the second subunit. When ATP is hydrolyzed to ADP, the serine can no longer form a hydrogen bond to ADP due to the loss of the inorganic phosphate which causes the serine side chain to twist, causing a conformational change in the second subunit. This conformational change also causes the serine to no longer be able to form a hydrogen bond with the histidine attached to the main loop and this weakens the linkage between subunits one and three, causing the entire molecule to twist. This twisting puts strain on the molecule and destabilizes it.

Actin depolymerizing factor is able to bind to the destabilized F-actin by inserting the central helix into the cleft between the first and third subunits of actin. Actin depolymerizing factor binds F-actin cooperatively and induces a conformational change in F-actin that causes it to twist further and become more destabilized. This twisting causes severing of the bond between actin monomers, depolymerizing the filament.

== Regulation ==
=== Phosphorylation ===
Actin depolymerization factor is regulated by the phosphorylation of a serine on the C terminus by LIM kinases. Actin depolymerizing factor is activated when it is dephosphorylated and inhibited when it is phosphorylated.

=== pH ===
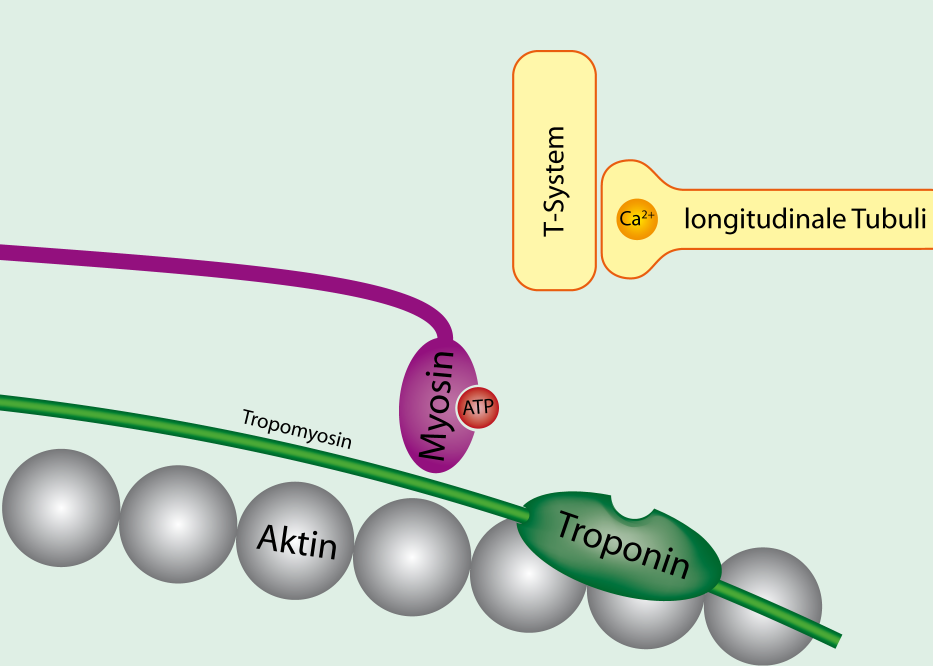
Tropomyosin bound to actin

An alkaline environment stabilizes the inorganic phosphate released when ATP is hydrolyzed to ADP, so therefore a higher pH increases the favorability of the ATP bound to F-actin to be hydrolyzed to ADP resulting in the destabilization of actin.

=== Tropomyosin binding ===
F-actin binds the protein Tropomyosin and actin depolymerizing factor competitively and mutually exclusively. F-actin binding of Tropomyosin is uncooperative so therefore the binding of Tropomyosin does not induce a conformational change in F-actin and does not cause it to become destabilized. However, because F-actin cannot bind both Tropomyosin and actin depolymerizing factor at the same time due to Tropomyosin blocking the binding site of actin depolymerizing factor when it is bound to actin, Tropomyosin acts as a protector of actin against depolymerization.

== See also ==
- Cofilin 1
