= Hydroxycorticosteroids =

Biochemical Molecule

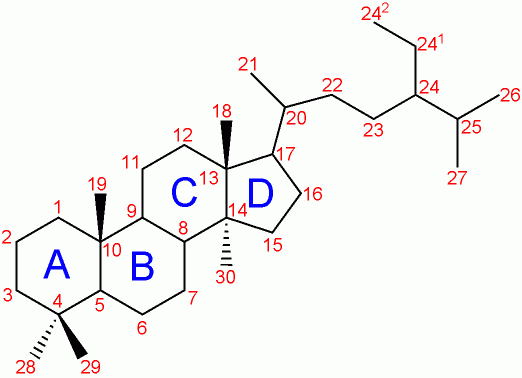
Steroid skeleton. Carbons 18 and above can be absent.

Hydroxycorticosteroids (OHCSs) are corticosteroids that have an additional hydroxy (-OH) group.

There are two main positions where the hydroxy group may be added: at carbon atom 11, and at carbon atom 17.

== At the 11 position ==
Corticosterone (an 11-hydroxycorticosteroid).

11-hydroxycorticosteroids (11-OHCSs) include:

- aldosterone
- corticosterone
- hydrocortisone

== At the 17 position ==
Cortisone (a 17-hydroxycorticosteroid).

17-hydroxycorticosteroids (17-OHCSs) include:

- cortisone
- hydrocortisone
