= Cofilin 1 =

Protein-coding gene in humans

CFL1
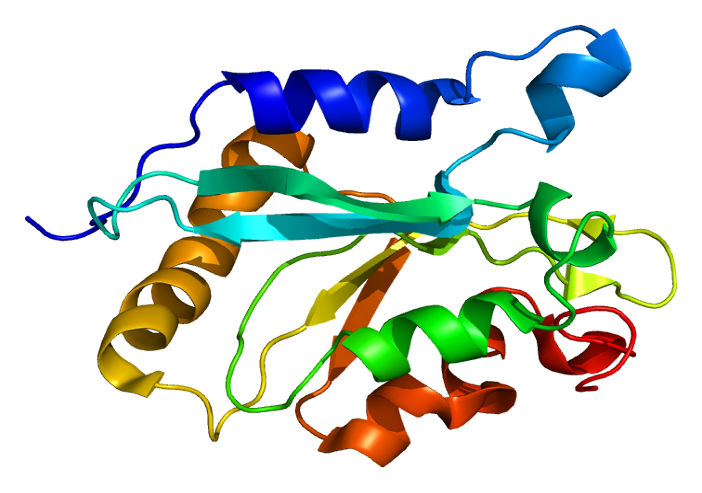

Identifiers
- Aliases: CFL1, CFL, HEL-S-15, cofilin, cofilin 1
- External IDs: OMIM: 601442; MGI: 101757; GeneCards: CFL1
Available structures
PDB	Ortholog search: PDBe RCSB
PDB	List of PDB id codes 4BEX, 1Q8G, 1Q8X, 3J0S, 5HVK, 5L6W

Gene location (Human)
Chr.	Chromosome 11 (human)
Band	11q13.1	Start	65,823,022 bp
Band	11q13.1	End	65,862,026 bp

Gene location (Mouse)
Chr.	Chromosome 19 (mouse)
Band	19|19 A	Start	5,540,483 bp
Band	19|19 A	End	5,545,229 bp
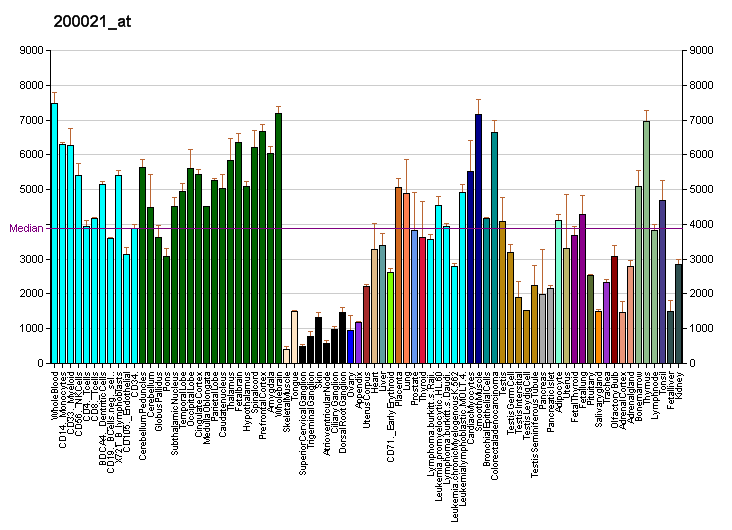
RNA expression pattern
Bgee	Human / Mouse (ortholog); Top expressed in: mucosa of ileum; pons; ventral tegmental area; inferior ganglion of vagus nerve; Brodmann area 46; subthalamic nucleus; superior vestibular nucleus; lateral nuclear group of thalamus; mucosa of colon; pylorus / Top expressed in: mesencephalon; dentate gyrus of hippocampal formation granule cell; neural tube; rhombencephalon; granulocyte; primary visual cortex; olfactory bulb; superior frontal gyrus; hippocampus proper; ganglionic eminence; More reference expression data
BioGPS	More reference expression data
Gene ontology
Molecular function	protein binding; actin binding; actin filament binding; signaling receptor binding
Cellular component	cytoplasm; vesicle; cell projection; membrane; focal adhesion; nuclear matrix; plasma membrane; intracellular anatomical structure; ruffle membrane; actin cytoskeleton; cytoskeleton; lamellipodium membrane; extracellular exosome; nucleus; extracellular matrix; extracellular space; cell-cell junction; cortical actin cytoskeleton; cytosol; lamellipodium
Biological process	response to virus; negative regulation of apoptotic process; positive regulation by host of viral process; cytoskeleton organization; Rho protein signal transduction; regulation of cell morphogenesis; regulation of dendritic spine morphogenesis; actin cytoskeleton organization; actin filament depolymerization; mitotic cytokinesis; neural crest cell migration; neural fold formation; protein phosphorylation; actin filament organization; establishment of cell polarity; actin filament fragmentation; positive regulation of actin filament depolymerization; response to amino acid; interleukin-12-mediated signaling pathway
Sources:Amigo / QuickGO
Orthologs
Databases	NCBI: entry; OMA: entry
Species	Human	Mouse
Entrez	1072	12631
Ensembl	ENSG00000172757	ENSMUSG00000056201
UniProt	P23528	P18760
RefSeq (mRNA)	NM_005507	NM_007687
RefSeq (protein)	NP_005498	NP_031713
Location (UCSC)	Chr 11: 65.82 – 65.86 Mb	Chr 19: 5.54 – 5.55 Mb
PubMed search
- Wikidata
View/Edit Human	View/Edit Mouse

Cofilin 1 (non-muscle; n-cofilin), also known as CFL1, is a human gene, part of the ADF/cofilin family.

Cofilin is a widely distributed intracellular actin-modulating protein that binds and depolymerizes filamentous F-actin and inhibits the polymerization of monomeric G-actin in a pH-dependent manner. It is involved in the translocation of actin-cofilin complex from cytoplasm to nucleus.

One group reports that reelin signaling leads to serine3-phosphorylation of cofilin-1, and this interaction may play a role in the reelin-related regulation of neuronal migration.

== Interactions ==
Cofilin 1 has been shown to interact with HSPH1 and LIMK1.
