= Destrin =

Protein found in humans

DSTN
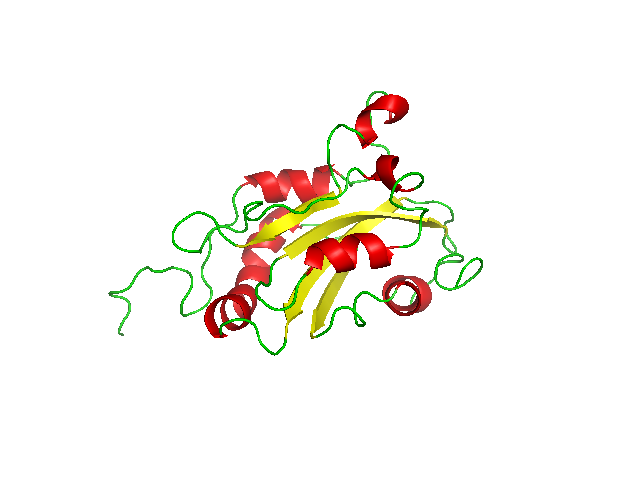

Identifiers
- Aliases: DSTN, ACTDP, ADF, HEL32, bA462D18.2, destrin, actin depolymerizing factor
- External IDs: OMIM: 609114; MGI: 1929270; GeneCards: DSTN

Gene location (Human)
Chr.	Chromosome 20 (human)
Band	20p12.1	Start	17,570,075 bp
Band	20p12.1	End	17,609,919 bp

Gene location (Mouse)
Chr.	Chromosome 2 (mouse)
Band	2 G1|2 70.89 cM	Start	143,757,240 bp
Band	2 G1|2 70.89 cM	End	143,785,244 bp
RNA expression pattern
Bgee	Human / Mouse (ortholog); Top expressed in: saphenous vein; urethra; popliteal artery; tibial arteries; right coronary artery; Descending thoracic aorta; vena cava; ascending aorta; superficial temporal artery; tail of epididymis / Top expressed in: Ileal epithelium; tunica media of zone of aorta; transitional epithelium of urinary bladder; corneal stroma; left colon; umbilical cord; lobe of prostate; cervix; right lung lobe; nasal epithelium; More reference expression data
BioGPS	n/a
Gene ontology
Molecular function	actin binding; protein binding; actin filament binding
Cellular component	extracellular exosome; cytoplasm; actin cytoskeleton; cortical actin cytoskeleton; intracellular anatomical structure
Biological process	actin polymerization or depolymerization; positive regulation of actin filament depolymerization; actin filament severing; actin filament depolymerization; actin filament fragmentation
Sources:Amigo / QuickGO
Orthologs
Databases	NCBI: entry; OMA: entry
Species	Human	Mouse
Entrez	11034	56431
Ensembl	ENSG00000125868	ENSMUSG00000015932
UniProt	P60981	Q9R0P5
RefSeq (mRNA)	NM_001011546; NM_006870	NM_019771
RefSeq (protein)	NP_001011546; NP_006861	NP_062745
Location (UCSC)	Chr 20: 17.57 – 17.61 Mb	Chr 2: 143.76 – 143.79 Mb
PubMed search
- Wikidata
View/Edit Human	View/Edit Mouse

Destrin (actin binding protein)
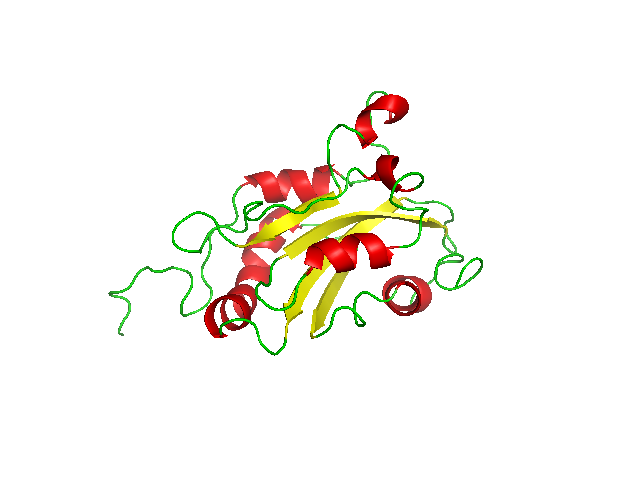
- Nuclear magnetic resonance determined configuration of the tertiary structure of Destrin.

Identifiers
- Symbol: DSTN
- Alt. symbols: ADF
- NCBI gene: 11034
- HGNC: 15750
- OMIM: 609114
- RefSeq: NM_006870
- UniProt: P60981

Other data
- Locus: Chr. 20 p12.1
Search for
- Structures: Swiss-model
- Domains: InterPro

Destrin or DSTN (also known as actin depolymerizing factor or ADF) is a protein which in humans is encoded by the DSTN gene. Destrin is a component protein in microfilaments.

The product of this gene belongs to the actin-binding proteins ADF (Actin-Depolymerizing Factor)/cofilin family. This family of proteins is responsible for enhancing the turnover rate of actin in vivo. This gene encodes the actin depolymerizing protein that severs actin filaments (F-actin) and binds to actin monomers (G-actin). Two transcript variants encoding distinct isoforms have been identified for this gene.

== Structure ==
The tertiary structure of destrin was determined by the use of triple-resonance multidimensional nuclear magnetic resonance, or NMR for short. The secondary and tertiary structures of destrin are similar to the gelsolin family which is another actin-regulating protein family.

There are three ordered layers to destrin which is a globular protein. There is a central β sheet that is composed of one parallel strand and three antiparallel strands. This β sheet is between a long α helix along with a shorter one and two shorter helices on the opposite side. The four helices are parallel to the β strands.

== Function ==
In a variety of eukaryotes, destrin regulates actin in the cytoskeleton. Destrin binds actin and is thought to connect it as gelsolin segment-1 does. Furthermore, the binding of actin by destrin and cofilin is regulated negatively by phosphorylation. Destrin can also sever actin filaments.
