= Indoor tanning =

Tanning using an artificial source of ultraviolet light

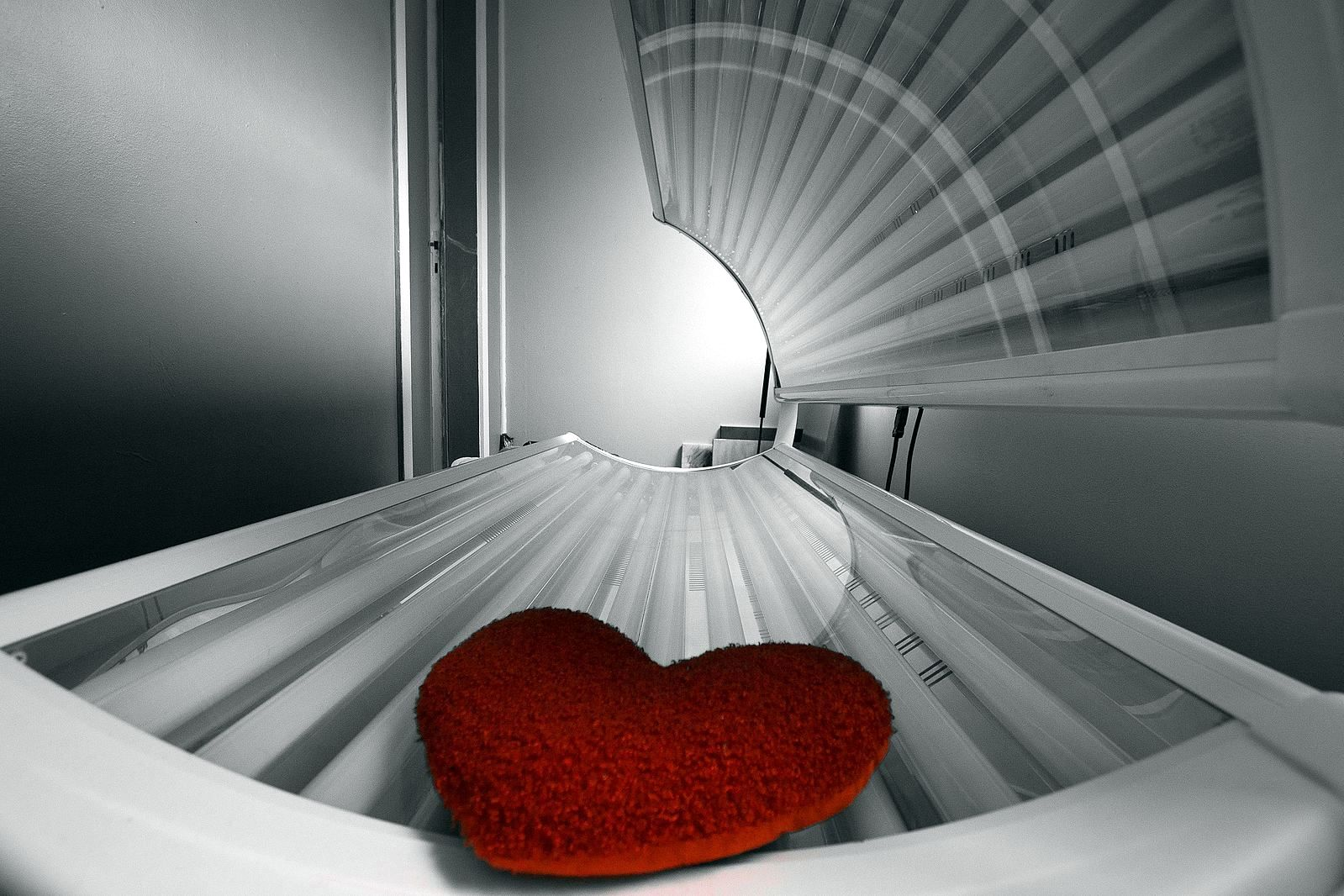
Horizontal low-pressure tanning bed

Indoor tanning involves using a device that emits ultraviolet radiation to produce a cosmetic tan. (Note: Lessin et al. (2012): "UVA is predominantly responsible for tanning of the skin and UVB is responsible for burning. Tanning is a human defense mechanism against DNA damage induced by UVR exposures. Melanin-containing melanocytes are closely associated with keratinocytes within the epidermis, and complex cellular and intercellular pathways control baseline pigmentation. Evolutionary and adaptive changes have created diversity of human pigmentation, skin types, and tanning capacities. Tanning results when UVR-induced melanogenesis increases pigment levels in the skin above baseline, and repeated exposures maintain these elevated levels. Tanning is a secondary response to UVR-induced DNA damage and is molecularly linked to DNA repair pathways. Tanning beds produce UVR similar to the sun, and likewise cause DNA damage and contribute to the development of skin cancers among humans.") Typically found in tanning salons, gyms, spas, hotels, and sporting facilities, and less often in private residences, the most common device is a horizontal tanning bed, also known as a sunbed or solarium. Vertical devices are known as tanning booths or stand-up sunbeds.

Indoor tanning became widespread in the Western world in the late 1970s. The practice finds a cultural parallel in skin whitening in Asian countries, and both support multibillion-dollar industries. Most indoor tanners are women, 16–25 years old, who want to improve their appearance or mood, acquire a pre-holiday tan, or treat a skin condition.

Indoor tanning increases the risk of developing skin cancer. As such, the number and usage of tanning facilities have declined, and many countries have either banned the practice outright or for people under 18 years of age.

== Background ==
=== Ultraviolet radiation ===
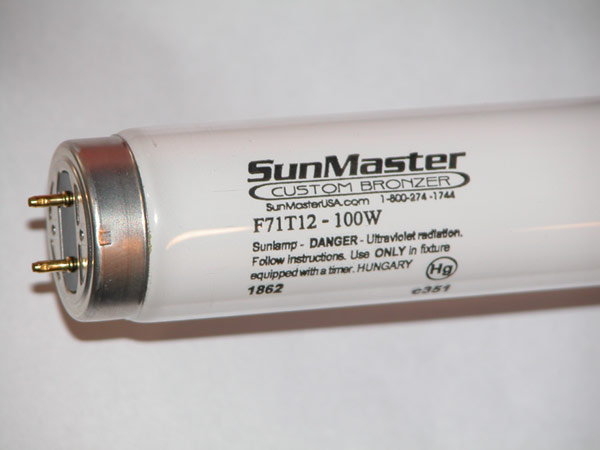
Typical F71T12 71-inch, 100-watt, bi-pin tanning lamp

Ultraviolet radiation (UVR) is part of the electromagnetic spectrum, just beyond visible light. Ultraviolet wavelengths are 100 to 400 nanometres (nm, billionths of a metre) and are divided into three bands: A, B, and C. UVA wavelengths are the longest, 315 to 400 nm; UVB are 280 to 315 nm, and UVC wavelengths are the shortest, 100 to 280 nm. (Note: Some texts use the crossover point of UVB at 320 nm rather than 315 nm.)

About 95% of the UVR that reaches Earth from the sun is UVA and 5% UVB; no appreciable UVC reaches Earth. While tanning systems before the 1970s produced some UVC, modern tanning devices produce no UVC, a small amount of UVB and mostly UVA. Classified by the WHO as a group 1 carcinogen, UV radiation has "complex and mixed effects on human health". While it causes skin cancer and other damage, including skin aging or creases such as wrinkles, it also triggers the synthesis of vitamin D and endorphins in the skin.

=== History ===
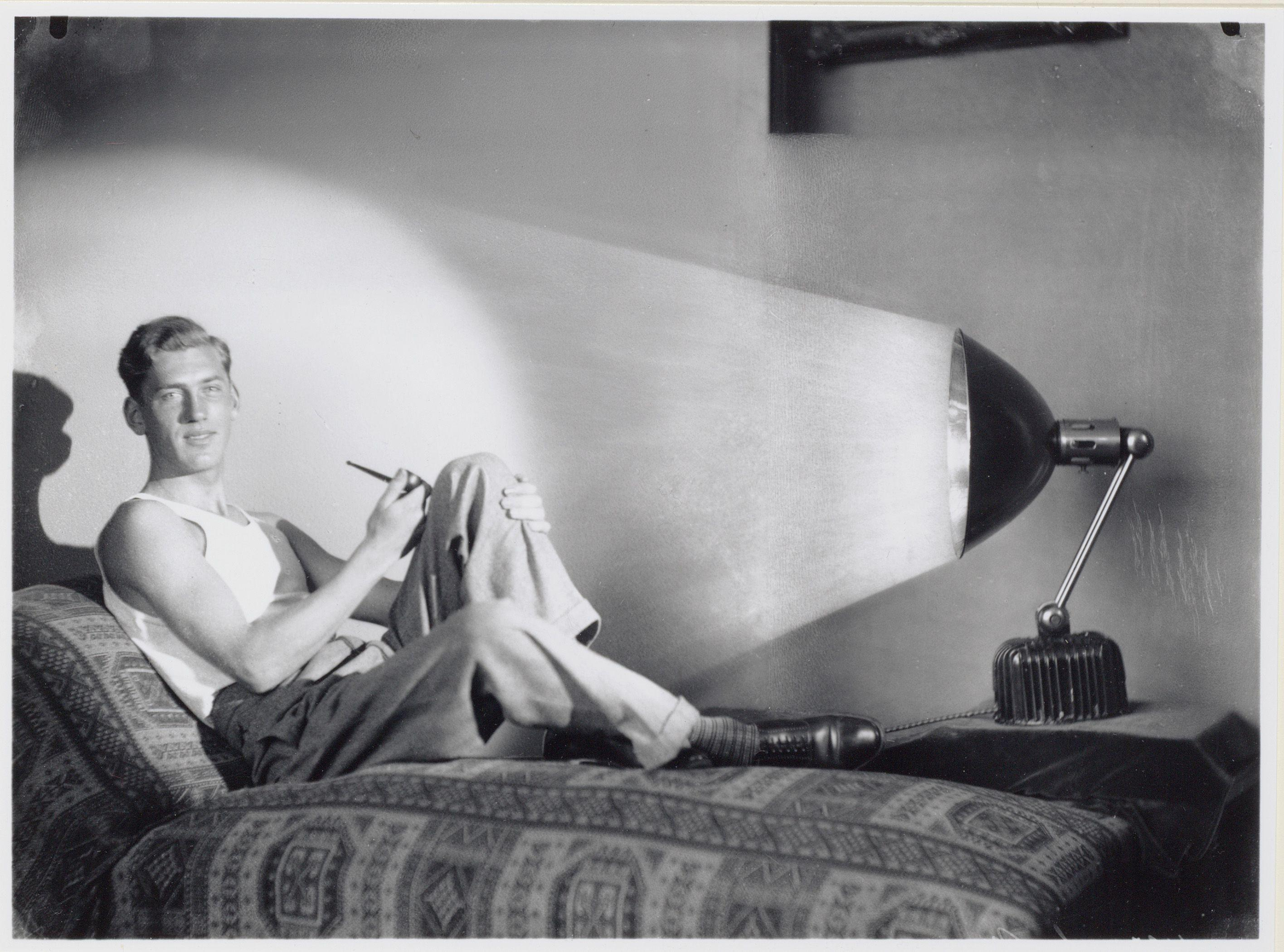
Sunlamp in the Netherlands, 1930

In 1890, the Danish physician Niels Ryberg Finsen developed a carbon arc lamp ("Finsen's light" or a "Finsen lamp") that produced ultraviolet radiation for use in skin therapy, including to treat lupus vulgaris. He won the 1903 Nobel Prize in Physiology or Medicine for his work.

Until the 20th century, pale skin was a symbol of high social class among white people in Europe and the United States. Victorian women would carry parasols and wear wide-brimmed hats and gloves; their homes featured heavy curtains that kept out the sun. But as the working classes moved from country work to city factories, and to crowded, dark, unsanitary homes, pale skin became increasingly associated with poverty and ill health. In 1923, Coco Chanel returned from a holiday in Cannes with a tan, later telling Vogue magazine: "A golden tan is the index of chic!" Tanned skin had become a fashion accessory.

In parallel, physicians began advising their patients on the benefits of the "sun cure", citing its antiseptic properties. Sunshine was promoted as a treatment for depression, diabetes, constipation, pneumonia, high and low blood pressure, and many other ailments. Home-tanning equipment was introduced in the 1920s in the form of "sunlamps" or "health lamps", UV lamps that emitted a large percentage of UVB, leading to burns.

Friedrich Wolff, a German scientist and hailed as the "father of indoor tanning", began using UV light on athletes, and developed beds that emitted 95% UVA and 5% UVB, which reduced the likelihood of burning. In 1975, Wolff invented the sunbed. A tanning salon was opened two years later in Berlin, followed by tanning salons in Europe and North America in the late 1970s. In 1978, Wolff's devices began selling in the United States, and the indoor tanning industry was born.

== Devices ==
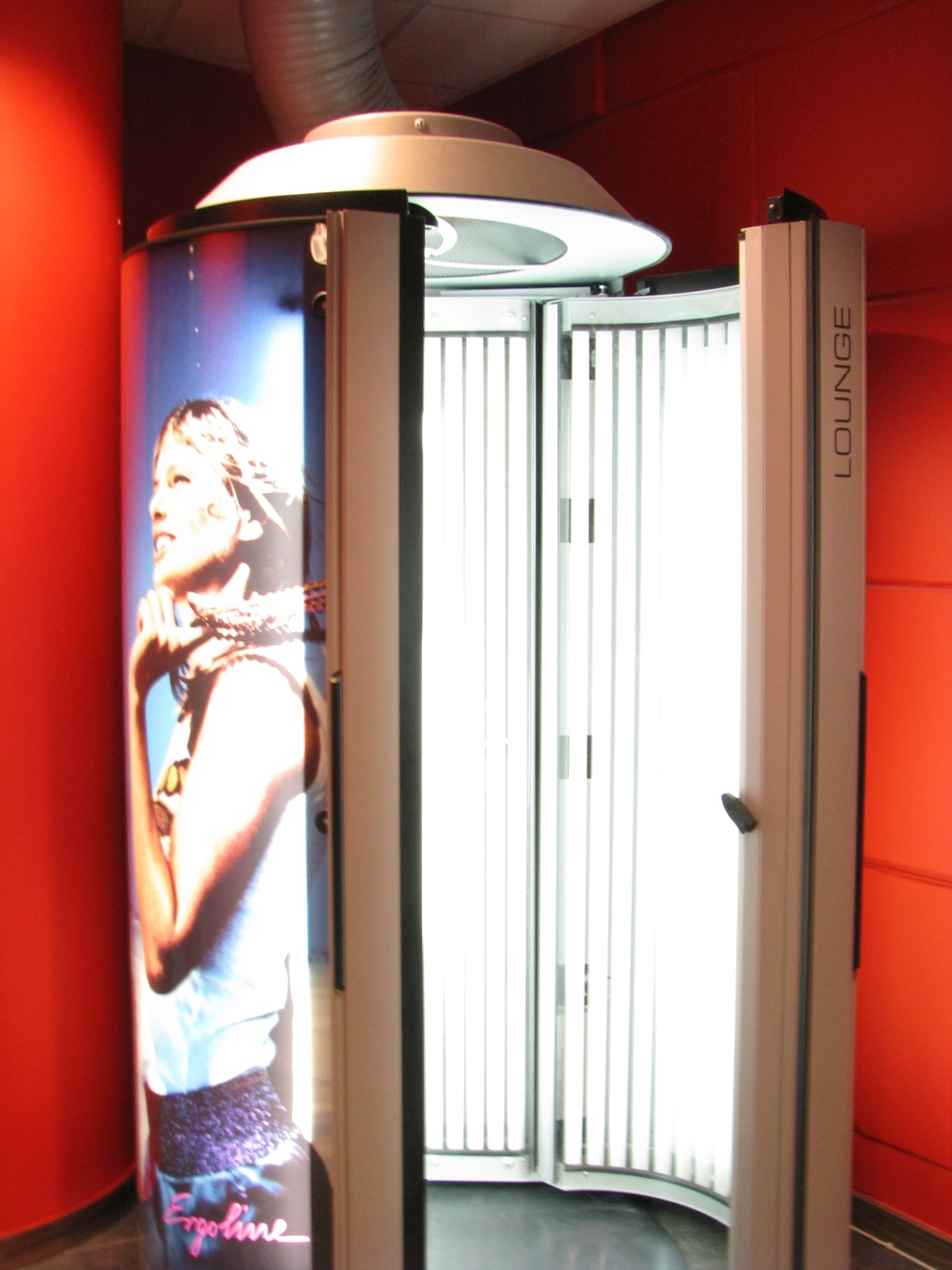
Tanning booth

=== Lamps ===
Tanning lamps, also known as tanning bulbs or tanning tubes, produce the ultraviolet light in tanning devices. The performance (or output) varies widely between brands and styles. Most are low-pressure fluorescent tubes, but high-pressure bulbs also exist. The electronics systems and the number of lamps affect performance, but to a lesser degree than the lamp itself. Tanning lamps are regulated separately from tanning beds in most countries, as they are the consumable portion of the system.

=== Beds ===
Most tanning beds are horizontal enclosures with a bench and canopy (lid) that house long, low-pressure fluorescent bulbs (100–200 watts) under an acrylic surface. The tanner is surrounded by bulbs when the canopy is closed. Modern tanning beds emit mostly UVA (the sun emits around 95% UVA and 5% UVB). One review of studies found that the UVB irradiance of beds was on average lower than the summer sun at latitudes 37°S to 35°N, but that UVA irradiance was on average much higher.

The user sets a timer (or it is set remotely by the salon operator), lies on the bed, and pulls down the canopy. The maximum exposure time for most low-pressure beds is 15–20 minutes. In the US, maximum times are set by the manufacturer according to how long it takes to produce four "minimal erythema doses" (MEDs), an upper limit laid down by the FDA. An MED is the amount of UV radiation that will produce erythema (redness of the skin) within a few hours of exposure.

High-pressure beds use smaller, higher-wattage quartz bulbs and emit a higher percentage of UVA. They may emit 10–15 times more UVA than the midday sun, and have a shorter maximum exposure time (typically 10–12 minutes). UVA gives an immediate, short-term tan by bronzing melanin in the skin, but no new melanin is formed. UVB has no immediate bronzing effect. However, a 72-hour delay allows the skin to produce new melanin, leading to longer-lasting tans. UVA is less likely to cause burning or dry skin than UVB, but is associated with wrinkling and loss of elasticity because it penetrates deeper.

Commercial tanning beds cost $6,000 to $30,000 as of 2006, with high-pressure beds at the high end.

=== Booths ===
Tanning booths (also known as stand-up sunbeds) are vertical enclosures; the tanner stands during exposure, hanging onto straps or handrails, and is surrounded by tanning bulbs. In most models, the tanner closes a door, but there are open designs, too. Some booths use the same electronics and lamps as tanning beds, but most have more lamps and are likely to use 100–160 watt lamps. They often have a maximum session of 7–15 minutes. There are other technical differences, or degrees of intensity, but for all practical intents, their function and safety are the same as a horizontal bed. Booths have a smaller footprint, which some commercial operators find useful. Some tanners prefer booths because of hygiene concerns, since the only shared surface is the floor.

== Eye protection ==
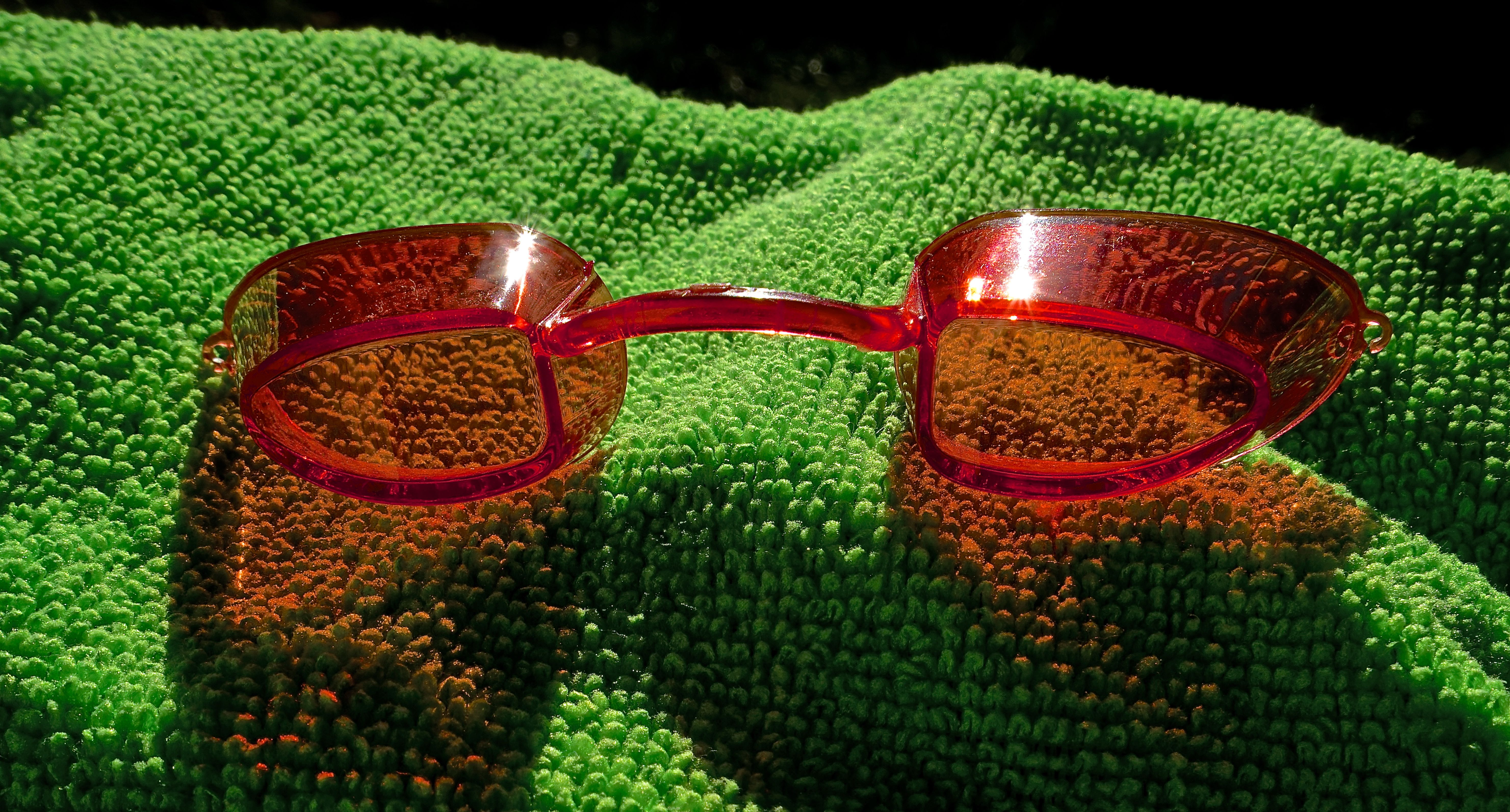
Goggles for indoor tanning

Eye protection for indoor tanning, either in the form of goggles, or disposable eye protection must be worn to avoid eye damage. In one 2004 study, tanners said they avoided using indoor tanning eye protection at times to prevent leaving the appearance of pale skin around the eyes.

== Prevalence ==
=== Tanning-device use ===
Indoor tanning is most popular among white females aged 16–25 years old, with low-to-moderate skin sensitivity, who know other tanners. Studies seeking to link indoor tanning to education level and income have returned inconsistent results. The prevalence was highest in one German study among those with a moderate level of education (neither high nor low).

The late teens to early mid-20s is the highest-prevalence age group. In a national survey of white teenagers in 2003 in the US (aged 13–19), 24% had used a tanning facility. Indoor-tanning prevalence figures in the US vary from 30 million each year to just under 10 million (7.8 million women and 1.9 million men). (Note: According to JAMA Dermatology in 2015, just under 10 million adults in the United States (7.8 million women and 1.9 million men) had tanned indoors in the previous 12 months, based on replies to the 2010 and 2013 National Health Interview Survey. According to the Food and Drug Administration in 2010, possibly using the Indoor Tanning Association as its source: "Each year 30 million people—over 10 percent of the American public—visit an indoor tanning facility.")

The figures in the US are in decline: according to the Centers for Disease Control and Prevention, usage in the 18–29 age group fell from 11.3 percent in 2010 to 8.6 percent in 2013, perhaps attributable in part to a 10% "tanning tax" introduced in 2010. Attitudes toward tanning vary across states; in one study, doctors in the Northeast and Midwest of the country were more likely than those in the South or West to recommend tanning beds to treat vitamin D deficiency and depression.

Tanning bed use is more prevalent in northern countries. In Sweden in 2001, 44% said they had used one (in a survey of 1,752 men and women aged 18–37). Their use increased in Denmark between 1994 and 2002 from 35% to 50% (reported use in the previous two years). In Germany, between 29% and 47% had used one, and one survey found that 21% had done so in the previous year. In France, 15% of adults in 1994–1995 had tanned indoors; the practice was more common in the north of France. In 2006, 12% of grade 9–10 students in Canada had used a tanning bed in the last year. In 2004, 7% of 8–11-year-olds in Scotland said they had used one. The North East of England has been described as the “sunbed capital of the UK” with 43% of adults reporting they have used sunbeds at least once, the highest rate in the country, followed by Scotland at 38%, according to a survey by the charity Melanoma Focus. Sunbed use in the United Kingdom varies by region, with the lowest levels reported in Northern Ireland (20%), followed by the South East, East Midlands, and West Midlands (26%).

=== Density of facilities ===
Tanning facilities are ubiquitous in the US, though they are in decline. In a U.S. study published in 2002, there was a higher density in colder areas with a lower median income and a higher proportion of whites. A study in 1997 found an average of 50.3 indoor-tanning facilities in 20 US cities (13.89 facilities for every 100,000 residents); the highest was 134 in Minneapolis, MN, and the lowest four in Honolulu, Hawaii. In 2006, a study of 116 U.S. cities found an average of 41.8 facilities, a higher density than either Starbucks or McDonald's. Of the country's 125 top colleges and universities in 2014, 12% had indoor-tanning facilities on campus and 42.4% in off-campus housing, 96% of the latter free of charge to the tenants.

There are fewer professional salons than tanning facilities; the latter include tanning beds in gyms, spas, and similar facilities. According to the FDA, citing the Indoor Tanning Association, there were 25,000 tanning salons in 2010 in the US (population 308.7 million in 2010). (Note: FDA (2010): "The industry grew rapidly in the 1980s and 90s; today, according to the Indoor Tanning Association, there are over 25,000 professional indoor tanning businesses in thousands of towns across America. Each year, 30 million people—over 10 percent of the American public—visit an indoor tanning facility. The industry employs more than 160,000 Americans, mostly in small businesses. Its total economic impact exceeds $5 billion annually.") Mailing-list data suggest there were 18,200 in September 2008 and 12,200 in September 2015, a decline of 30 percent. According to Chris Sternberg of the American Suntanning Association, the figures are 18,000 in 2009 and 9,500 in 2016.

The South West Public Health Observatory found 5,350 tanning salons in the UK in 2009: 4,492 in England (population 52.6 million in 2010), 484 in Scotland (5.3 million), 203 in Wales (3 million), and 171 in Northern Ireland (1.8 million).

== Reasons ==
=== Overview ===
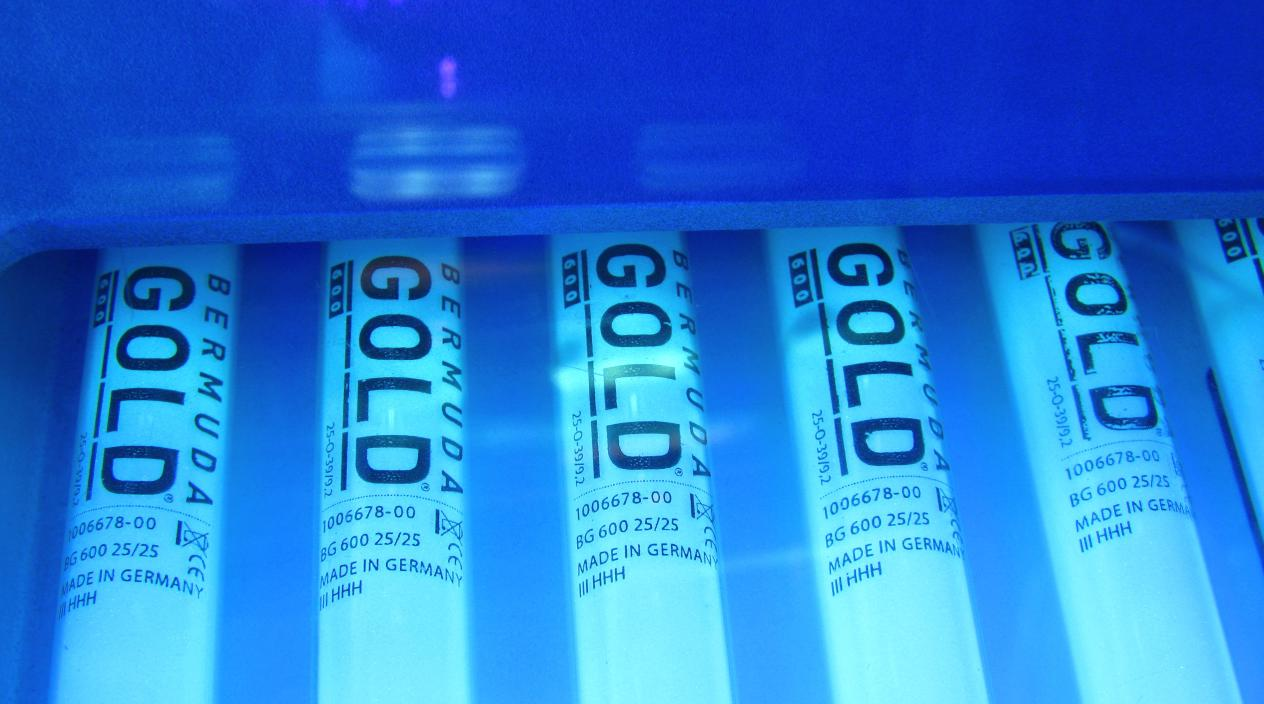
Tanning lamps

Reasons cited for indoor tanning include improving appearance, acquiring a pre-holiday tan, feeling good, and treating a skin condition. Tanners often cite feelings of well-being; exposure to tanning beds is reported to "increase serum beta-endorphin levels by 44%". Beta-endorphin is associated with feelings of relaxation and euphoria, including "runner's high".

Improving appearance is the most-cited reason. Studies show that tanned skin has semiotic power, signifying health, beauty, youth, and the ability to seduce. Women, in particular, say not only that they prefer their appearance with tanned skin, but that they receive the same message from friends and family, especially from other women. They believe tanned skin makes them look thinner and more toned, and that it covers or heals skin blemishes such as acne. Other reasons include acquiring a base tan for further sunbathing, the fact that a uniform tan is easier to achieve in a tanning unit than in the sun, and a desire to avoid tan lines. Proponents of indoor tanning say that tanning beds deliver more consistent, predictable exposure than the sun, but studies show that indoor tanners do suffer burns. In two surveys in the US in 1998 and 2004, 58% of indoor tanners reported burns during sessions.

=== Vitamin D ===
Vitamin D is produced when the skin is exposed to UVB, whether from sunlight or an artificial source. (Note: Vitamin D can also be obtained from supplements, fortified foods, cod liver oil, and in small amounts from salmon, tuna, mackerel, swordfish, egg yolk, beef liver, cheese, and some types of mushrooms.) It is needed for mineralization of bone and bone growth. Exposing arms and legs to a minimal 0.5 erythemal (mild sunburn) UVB dose is equal to consuming about 3000 IU of vitamin D3. Adults who used tanning beds weekly had higher blood concentrations of 25(OH)D along with higher hip bone density compared to adults who did not use them.

Obtaining vitamin D from indoor tanning has to be weighed against the risk of developing skin cancer. The indoor-tanning industry has stressed the relationship between tanning and the production of vitamin D. According to the US National Institutes of Health, some researchers have suggested that "5–30 minutes of sun exposure between 10 AM and 3 PM at least twice a week to the face, arms, legs, or back without sunscreen usually lead to sufficient vitamin D synthesis and that the moderate use of commercial tanning beds that emit 2%–6% UVB radiation is also effective". Most researchers say the health risks outweigh the benefits, that the UVB doses produced by tanning beds exceed what is needed for adequate vitamin D production, and that adequate vitamin D levels can be achieved by taking supplements and eating fortified foods.

=== Medical use ===
Certain skin conditions, including keratosis, psoriasis, eczema, and acne, may be treated with UVB light therapy, including by using tanning beds in commercial salons. Using tanning beds allows patients to access UV exposure when dermatologist-provided phototherapy is not available. A systematic review published in Dermatology and Therapy in 2015 noted that moderate sunlight is a treatment recommended by the American National Psoriasis Foundation, and suggested that clinicians consider UV phototherapy and tanning beds as a source of that therapy. Physicians have recommended tanning devices to treat skin conditions.

When UV light therapy is used in combination with psoralen, an oral or topical medication, the combined therapy is referred to as PUVA. A concern with the use of commercial tanning is that beds that primarily emit UVA may not treat psoriasis effectively. One study found that plaque psoriasis is responsive to erythemogenic doses of either UVA or UVB. It does require more energy to reach erythemogenic dosing with UVA.

== Risks ==
=== Skin cancer ===
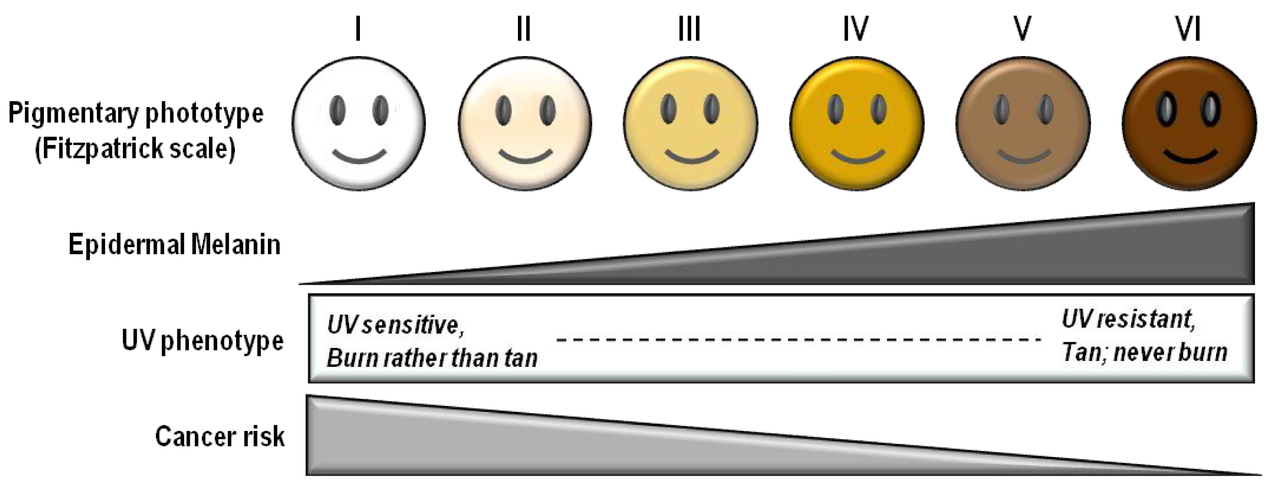
Fitzpatrick scale: Influence of pigmentation on skin cancer risk

Exposure to ultraviolet radiation (UVR), whether from outdoor tanning under the sun or indoor tanning using tanning devices, is known to be a major cause of the three main types of skin cancer: non-melanoma skin cancer (basal cell carcinoma and squamous cell carcinoma) and melanoma. Overexposure to UVR induces at least two types of DNA damage: cyclobutane–pyrimidine dimers (CPDs) and 6–4 photoproducts (6–4PPs). While DNA repair enzymes can fix some mutations, if they are not sufficiently effective, a cell will acquire genetic mutations which may cause the cell to die or become cancerous. These mutations can result in cancer, aging, persistent mutation and cell death. For example, squamous cell carcinoma can be caused by a UVB-induced mutation in the p53 gene.

Non-melanoma skin cancer includes squamous cell carcinoma (SCC) and basal cell carcinoma (BCC) and is more common than melanoma. With early detection and treatment, it is typically not life-threatening. Prevalence increases with age, cumulative exposure to UV, and proximity to the equator. It is most prevalent in Australia, where the rate is 1,000 in 100,000 and where, as of 2000, it represented 75 percent of all cancers.

Melanoma accounts for approximately one percent of skin cancer, and causes most of skin cancer-related deaths. The average age of diagnosis is 63, and it is the most common cancer in the 25–29 age group and the second most common in the 15-29 group, which may be due in part to the increased sunlight UV exposure and use of indoor tanning observed in these populations. In the United States, the melanoma incidence rate was 22.3 per 100,000, based on 2010–2014 data from the National Institutes of Health Surveillance, Epidemiology and End Results (SEER) Program, and the death rate was 2.7 per 100,000. 9,730 people were estimated to die of melanoma in the United States in 2017, and these numbers are anticipated to continue rising. (Note: White people are most at risk of melanoma, with a lifetime risk of 2.5% (1 in 40), against 0.1% (1 in 1,000) for black people and 0.5% (1 in 200) for Hispanics, according to the American Cancer Society.) Although 91.7% of patients diagnosed with melanoma survive beyond 5 years, advanced melanoma is largely incurable, and only 19.9% percent of patients with metastatic disease survive beyond 5 years.

A meta-analysis of U.S., European, and Australian data on tanning bed use and skin cancer estimated that annually, 450,000 cases of non-melanoma skin cancer and more than 10,000 cases of melanoma can be attributed to indoor tanning.

=== Age and indoor tanning ===
The age at which someone begins indoor tanning has a known impact on the future risk of developing cancers. A 2012 analysis of epidemiological studies found a 20% increase in the risk of melanoma (a relative risk of 1.20) among those who had ever used a tanning device compared to those who had not, and a 59% percent increase (a relative risk of 1.59) among those who had used one before age 35. Additionally, a 2014 systematic review and meta-analysis found that indoor tanners had a 16 percent increased risk of developing melanoma, which increased to 23 percent for North Americans. For those who started tanning indoors before age 25, their risk further increased to 35% compared to those who began after age 25.

=== Young people ===
Children and adolescents who use tanning beds are at greater risk because of biological vulnerability to UV radiation. Epidemiological studies have shown that exposure to artificial tanning increases the risk of melanoma and that the longer the exposure, the greater the risk, particularly in individuals exposed before the age of 30 or who have been sunburned.

One study conducted among college students found that awareness of the risks of tanning beds did not deter the students from using them. Teenagers are frequent targets of tanning industry marketing, which includes offers of coupons and placing ads in high-school newspapers. Members of the United States House Committee on Energy and Commerce commissioned a "sting" operation in 2012, in which callers posing as a 16-year-old girl who wanted to tan for the first time called 300 tanning salons in the US. Staff reportedly failed to follow FDA recommendations, denied the risks of tanning, and offered misleading information about benefits.

=== Dependency concern ===
Developing a dependence on indoor tanning has been recognized as a psychiatric disorder. The disorder is characterized as excessive indoor tanning that causes the subject personal distress; it has been associated with anxiety, eating disorders, and smoking. The media has described the disorder as tanorexia. According to the Canadian Pediatric Society, "repeated UVR exposures, and the use of indoor tanning beds specifically, may have important systemic and behavioral consequences, including mood changes, compulsive disorders, pain and physical dependency." Researchers at the Yale School of Public Health found evidence of dependence on tanning in a 2017 paper.

=== Other risks ===
Exposure to UV radiation is associated with skin aging, wrinkle production, liver spots, loss of skin elasticity, erythema (reddening of the skin), sunburn, photokeratitis (snow blindness), ocular melanoma (eye cancer), and infections. Tanning beds can contain many microbes, some of which are pathogens that can cause skin infections and gastric distress. In one 2009 study in New York, the most common pathogens found on tanning beds were Pseudomonas spp. (aeruginosa and putida), Bacillus spp., Klebsiella pneumoniae, Enterococcus species, Staphylococcus aureus, and Enterobacter cloacae. Several prescription and over-the-counter drugs, including antidepressants, antibiotics, antifungals, and anti-diabetic medication, can cause photosensitivity, which makes burning the skin while tanning more likely. A lack of staff training in tanning facilities increases this risk.

== Regulation ==
Since 1997, several countries and US states have banned persons under 18 years old from indoor tanning.

=== Australia ===
Commercial tanning services are banned in all states, except the Northern Territory, where no salons are in operation. Private ownership of tanning beds is permitted. The commercial use of tanning beds was banned entirely in Australia in 2015.

=== Brazil ===
Brazil's National Health Surveillance Agency banned the use of tanning beds for cosmetic purposes in 2009, making it the first to enact a ban. It followed a 2002 ban on minors using the beds.

=== Canada ===
Indoor tanning is prohibited for under-18s in British Columbia, Alberta, Manitoba, Saskatchewan, Ontario, Quebec, and Prince Edward Island; and for under-19s in New Brunswick, Nova Scotia, Newfoundland and Labrador, and the Northwest Territories. Health Canada recommends against the use of tanning equipment.

=== European Union ===
In 1997, France became the first country to ban minors from indoor tanning. Under-18s are also prohibited in Austria, Belgium,, Finland, Germany, Ireland, Norway, Poland, Portugal, Spain, Sweden, and the United Kingdom. In addition, Ireland prohibits salons from offering "happy hour" discounts.

=== New Zealand ===
In New Zealand, indoor tanning is regulated by a voluntary code of practice. Salons are asked to turn away under-18s, those with type 1 skin (fair skin that burns easily or never tans), people who experienced episodes of sunburn as children, and anyone taking certain medications, with several moles, or who has had skin cancer. Tanners are asked to sign a consent form. The form includes health information and advice about the importance of wearing goggles. Surveys have found a high level of non-compliance. The government has carried out bi-annual surveys of tanning facilities since 2012.

=== United States ===
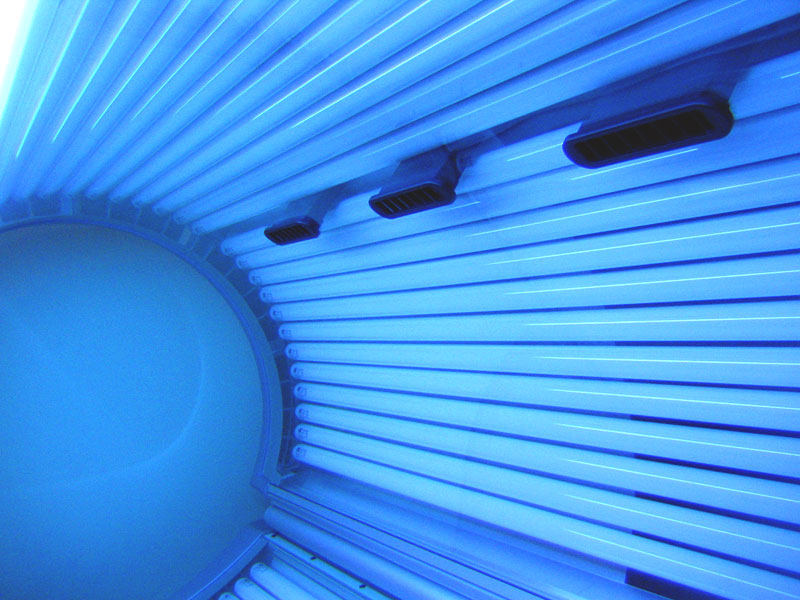
Inside a tanning bed

The Food and Drug Administration (FDA) classifies tanning beds as "moderate risk" devices (changed in 2014 from "low risk"). It requires that devices carry a black box warning that they should not be used by individuals under the age of 18. There is no federal ban on indoor use by minors. As of 1 January 2017, California, Delaware, the District of Columbia, Hawaii, Illinois, Kansas, Louisiana, Massachusetts, Minnesota, Nevada, New Hampshire, North Carolina, Oregon, Texas, Vermont and Washington have banned the use of tanning beds for minors under the age of 18. Other states strictly regulate indoor tanning under the age of 18, with most banning indoor tanning for persons under the age of 14 unless medically required, and some requiring the consent of a guardian for those aged 14–17. Injuries caused by tanning devices lead to over 3,000 emergency room cases a year in the United States. (Note: FDA (2015): "This number is based on the average yearly estimate of injuries for 2003 and 2012 (the most recent years for which data are available). It is likely that the actual number of injuries may be higher because this estimate only includes cases that are initially treated in US hospital emergency departments and reported to a central database. This estimate does not include cases that are treated in outpatient clinics, physicians' offices, not medically treated, or not reported.")

In 2010, under the Affordable Care Act, a 10% excise tax was introduced on indoor tanning, dubbed a tanning tax, which is added to the fees charged by tanning facilities; it was expected to raise $2.7 billion for health care over ten years.

Tanning beds are regulated in the United States by the federal government's Code of Federal Regulations (21 CFR 1040.20). This is designed to ensure that the devices adhere to a set of safety rules, with the primary focus on sunbed and lamp manufacturers regarding maximum exposure times and product equivalence. Additionally, tanning salons must have a "Recommended Exposure Schedule" posted on both the front of the tanning bed and in the owner's manual, and list the original lamp that was certified for that particular tanning bed. Salon owners are required to replace the lamps with the same lamp or a lamp that is certified by the manufacturer.

States control regulations for salons, regarding operator training, sanitization of sunbeds and eyewear, and additional warning signs. Many states also ban or regulate the use of tanning beds by minors under the age of 18.

American osteopathic physician Joseph Mercola was prosecuted in 2016 by the Federal Trade Commission (FTC) for selling tanning beds to "reverse your wrinkles" and "slash your risk of cancer". The settlement meant that consumers who had purchased the devices were eligible for refunds totaling $5.3 million. Mercola had falsely claimed that the FDA "endorsed indoor tanning devices as safe", and had failed to disclose that he had paid the Vitamin D Council for its endorsement of his devices. The FTC said that it was deceptive for the defendants to fail to disclose that tanning is not necessary to produce vitamin D.

== See also ==
- Electric bath
- Indoor tanning lotion
- Light skin in Japanese culture
- Sunless tanning

== Bibliography ==
Book chapters are cited in short form above and long form below. All other sources are cited above only.

- Coups, Elliot J. and Phillips, L. Alison (2012). "Prevalence and Correlates of Indoor Tanning", in Carolyn J. Heckman, Sharon L. Manne (eds.), Shedding Light on Indoor Tanning. Dordrecht: Springer Science & Business Media, 5–32. ISBN 978-94-007-2048-0
- Hay, Jennifer and Lipsky, Samara (2012), "International Perspectives on Indoor Tanning", in Heckman and Manne (eds)., 179–193.
- Hunt, Yvonne; Augustson, Erik; Rutten, Lila; Moser, Richard; and Yaroch, Amy (2012). "History and Culture of Tanning in the United States", in Heckman and Manne (eds.), 33–68.
- Lessin, Stuart R; Perlis, Clifford S.; Zook, and Matthew B. Zook (2012). "How Ultraviolet Radiation Tans Skin" in Heckman and Manne (eds.), 87–94.
- Lluria-Prevatt, Maria; Dickinson, Sally E.; and Alberts, David S. (2013). "Skin Cancer Prevention", in David Alberts, Lisa M. Hess (eds.). Fundamentals of Cancer Prevention. Heidelberg and Berlin: Springer Verlag, 321–376. ISBN 978-3-642-38983-2
