= Suntan lotion =

Suntan lotion can refer to:

- Indoor tanning lotion, used to increase tanning
- Sunscreen, used to prevent sunburn, premature aging, and skin cancer
