= Tanning tax =

U. S. excise tax on tanning services

The tanning tax is a ten percent federal excise tax that the U.S. government requires tanning providers to collect on indoor tanning services. Tanning service providers must pay the tax each quarter to the IRS. The ten percent tax must be collected from the client, according to the IRS, similar to the collection of a sales tax.

== History ==
The tanning tax originates from passage of the Patient Protection and Affordable Care Act, also known as Obamacare. The tax was among 21 new taxes that were included in the law.

According to Forbes, the tax was expected to raise $2.7 billion over the first decade. After five years of the tax going into effect, it raised less than $500 million.

== Exclusions ==
Phototherapy services, which the IRS defines as a "service which exposes an individual to specific wavelengths of light for the treatment of dermatological conditions, sleep disorders, seasonal affective disorder or other psychiatric disorder, neonatal jaundice, wound healing, or other medical condition determined by a licensed medical professional to be treatable by exposing the individual to specific wavelengths of light" are excluded from the tax if they are performed by a licensed medical professional on that professional's premises.

If tanning services are provided as part of a gym membership that is considered a "qualified physical fitness facility", (Note: According to the IRS, qualified physical fitness facility "is a facility (i) in which the predominant business or activity is providing facilities, equipment and services to its members for purposes of exercise and physical fitness, (ii) indoor tanning services is not a substantial part of its business and, (iii) it does not offer tanning services to the public for a fee or offer different pricing options to its members based on indoor tanning services.") the tax is not applicable.

Spray tanning services, as well as the purchase of topical creams and lotions, are also excluded from the tax.

== Economic effects ==
According to the American Suntanning Association, almost 10,000 tanning salons have gone out of business since the tax went into effect, resulting in the loss of 81,000 jobs.

Prior to passage of the PPACA, over 164,000 people worked in the tanning industry. As of June 2015 that number was 83,000. In California, the number of tanning salons dropped in half between passage of the PPACA in 2010 and 2015.

Business owners say the "little-noticed 10 percent tax on tanning in President Barack Obama's health care overhaul has crippled the industry," according to the Denver Post. However, experts say the tanning industry is overstating the tax's effects on jobs and business closings, and that other factors such as public health warning against tanning play into the equation.

== Legislation ==
In the U.S. House, Congressman George Holding of North Carolina introduced a bill on June 9, 2015. H.R. 2698, "The Tanning Tax Repeal Act of 2015" would repeal the ten percent excise tax.

== See also ==
- Indoor tanning
- Internal Revenue Service
- Taxation in the United States
- Ultraviolet light therapy
