= Ecological study =

Type of observational study in epidemiology

In epidemiology, ecological studies are used to understand the relationship between outcome and exposure at a population level, where 'population' represents a group of individuals with a shared characteristic such as geography, ethnicity, socio-economic status of employment. What differentiates ecological studies from other studies is that the unit analysis being studied is the group, therefore inferences cannot be made about individual study participants. On the other hand, details of outcome and exposure can be generalized to the population being studied. Examples of such studies include investigating associations between units of grouped data, such as electoral wards, regions, or even whole countries.

== Study design ==
Generally, three different designs can be used to conduct ecological studies depending on the situation. Such studies may compare populations or groups using a multiple-group design, periods of time using a time-trend design, or groups and time using a mixed design.

== Notable examples ==
=== Cholera study ===
The study by John Snow regarding a cholera outbreak in London is considered the first ecological study to solve a health issue. He used a map of deaths from cholera to determine that the source of the cholera was a pump on Broad Street. He had the pump handle removed in 1854 and people stopped dying there. It was only when Robert Koch discovered bacteria years later that the mechanism of cholera transmission was understood.

=== Diet and cancer ===
Dietary risk factors for cancer have also been studied using both geographical and temporal ecological studies. Multi-country ecological studies of cancer incidence and mortality rates with respect to national diets have shown that some dietary factors such as animal products (meat, milk, fish and eggs), added sweeteners/sugar, and some fats appear to be risk factors for many types of cancer, while cereals/grains and vegetable products as a whole appear to be risk reduction factors for many types of cancer. Temporal changes in Japan in the types of cancer common in Western developed countries have been linked to the nutrition transition to the Western diet.

=== UV radiation and cancer ===
An important advancement in the understanding of risk-modifying factors for cancer was made by examining maps of cancer mortality rates. The map of colon cancer mortality rates in the United States was used by the brothers Cedric and Frank C. Garland to propose the hypothesis that solar ultraviolet B (UVB) radiation, through vitamin D production, reduced the risk of cancer (the UVB-vitamin D-cancer hypothesis).

=== Diet and Alzheimer's ===
Links between diet and Alzheimer's disease have been studied using both geographical and temporal ecological studies. The first paper linking diet to risk of Alzheimer's disease was a multi-country ecological study published in 1997. It used prevalence of Alzheimer's disease in 11 countries along with dietary supply factors, finding that total fat and total energy (caloric) supply were strongly correlated with prevalence, while fish and cereals/grains were inversely correlated (i.e., protective). Diet is now considered an important risk-modifying factor for Alzheimer's disease. Recently it was reported that the rapid rise of Alzheimer's disease in Japan between 1985 and 2007 was likely due to the nutrition transition from the traditional Japanese diet to the Western diet.

=== Vitamin D and influenza ===
Another example of the use of temporal ecological studies relates to influenza. John Cannell and associates hypothesized that the seasonality of influenza was largely driven by seasonal variations in solar UVB doses and calcidiol levels. A randomized controlled trial involving Japanese school children found that taking 1000 IU per day vitamin D3 reduced the risk of type A influenza by two-thirds.

== Advantages and drawbacks ==
Ecological studies are particularly useful for generating hypotheses since they can use existing data sets and rapidly test the hypothesis. The advantages of the ecological studies include the large number of people that can be included in the study and the large number of risk-modifying factors that can be examined.

The term "ecological fallacy" means that risk-associations apparent between different groups of people may not accurately reflect the true association between individuals within those groups. Ecological studies should include as many known risk-modifying factors for any outcome as possible, adding others if warranted. Then the results should be evaluated by other methods, using, for example, Hill's criteria for causality in a biological system.
