= Tanning oil =

Tanning oil can refer to:

- Oils used in leather tanning
- Indoor tanning lotion, oils and lotions that enhance tanning in a tanning bed or outdoors
- Sunscreen, oils and lotions that block ultraviolet sun rays to protect skin from sunburn
