= Α-Endorphin =

α-Endorphin

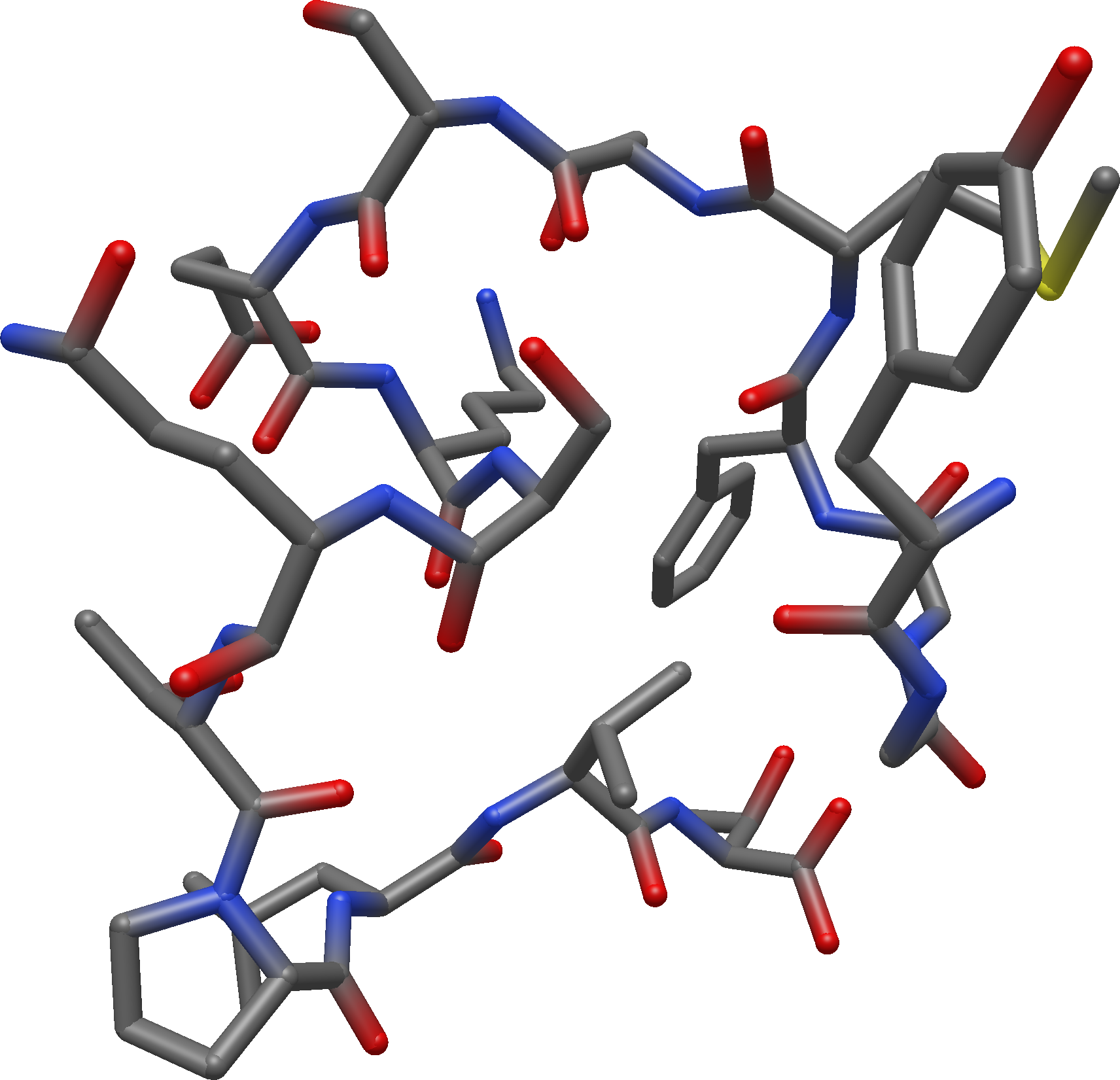

Identifiers
CAS Number	61512-76-3
3D model (JSmol)	Interactive image
ChEMBL	ChEMBL255300
ChemSpider	17294814
PubChem CID	16138308
- InChI: InChI=1S/C77H120N18O26S/c1-38(2)31-51(70(113)91-60(39(3)4)74(117)94-63(42(7)100)77(120)121)88-73(116)55-18-14-29-95(55)76(119)62(41(6)99)93-67(110)48(23-25-56(80)102)85-71(114)53(36-96)89-65(108)47(17-12-13-28-78)84-66(109)49(24-26-59(105)106)86-72(115)54(37-97)90-75(118)61(40(5)98)92-68(111)50(27-30-122-8)87-69(112)52(33-43-15-10-9-11-16-43)83-58(104)35-81-57(103)34-82-64(107)46(79)32-44-19-21-45(101)22-20-44/h9-11,15-16,19-22,38-42,46-55,60-63,96-101H,12-14,17-18,23-37,78-79H2,1-8H3,(H2,80,102)(H,81,103)(H,82,107)(H,83,104)(H,84,109)(H,85,114)(H,86,115)(H,87,112)(H,88,116)(H,89,108)(H,90,118)(H,91,113)(H,92,111)(H,93,110)(H,94,117)(H,105,106)(H,120,121)/t40-,41-,42-,46+,47+,48+,49+,50+,51+,52+,53+,54+,55+,60+,61+,62+,63+/m1/s1 Key: NXSIJWJXMWBCBX-NWKQFZAZSA-N
- SMILES: C[C@H]([C@@H](C(=O)N[C@@H](CO)C(=O)N[C@@H](CCC(=O)O)C(=O)N[C@@H](CCCCN)C(=O)N[C@@H](CO)C(=O)N[C@@H](CCC(=O)N)C(=O)N[C@@H]([C@@H](C)O)C(=O)N1CCC[C@H]1C(=O)N[C@@H](CC(C)C)C(=O)N[C@@H](C(C)C)C(=O)N[C@@H]([C@@H](C)O)C(=O)O)NC(=O)[C@H](CCSC)NC(=O)[C@H](CC2=CC=CC=C2)NC(=O)CNC(=O)CNC(=O)[C@H](CC3=CC=C(C=C3)O)N)O

Properties
Chemical formula	C_{77}H_{120}N_{18}O_{26}S
Molar mass	1745.97 g·mol^{−1}
- Except where otherwise noted, data are given for materials in their standard state (at 25 °C [77 °F], 100 kPa). verify (what is ?) Infobox references

α-Endorphin (alpha-endorphin) is an endogenous opioid peptide with a length of 16 amino acids, and the amino acid sequence: Tyr-Gly-Gly-Phe-Met-Thr-Ser-Glu-Lys-Ser-Gln-Thr-Pro-Leu-Val-Thr. Researchers at the Salk Institute were pioneers in isolating, sequencing, and synthesizing the peptides they named α- and γ-endorphin, and they determined that they had morphinomimetic activity. With the use of mass spectrometry and dansyl-Edman methods, Nicholas Ling, one of the researchers from the Salk Institute, was able to determine the primary sequence of α-endorphin.

== Relation to beta- and gamma-endorphin ==
Endorphins are generally known as neurotransmitters that are released when the body goes into pain. The three endorphins that play a role in this response are α-endorphin, β-endorphin (beta-endorphin), and γ-endorphin (gamma-endorphin) which are all derived from the same polypeptide known as pro-opiomelanocortin. Although all play roles as neurotransmitters, the specific effects of all three differ. The most studied endorphin of the three is β-endorphin. α-Endorphins are known to contain one less amino acid than γ-endorphins, differing by a single leucine amino acid at the terminal end. Although this may seem minor, It allows them to have vastly different effects. Studies found that γ-endorphins and α-endorphins have opposite effects which allow them to help maintain a level of homeostasis within the brain and behavior of animals. All of the specific effects on the body of α-endorphins are not yet fully studied nor fully understood by the science community. However, some studies suggest that these endorphins behave similarly to psychostimulant drug.

Ranking based length, α-endorphins are the shortest with 16 amino acid residues. Meanwhile, the β-endorphin has the longest chain which begins with the same 16 amino acids as α-Endorphins: Tyr-Gly-Gly-Phe-Met-Thr-Ser-Glu-Lys-Ser-Gln-Thr-Pro-Leu-Val-Thr. The same sequence is also present in γ-endorphin. The beginning Tyr-Gly-Gly-Phe-Met chain is also known as the N-terminal pentapeptide opioid sequence. With such configuration, endorphins act as agonists to opioid receptors in the brain.

== Effects on behavior ==
Studies have shown that α-endorphin is the strongest peptide in delaying avoidance behaviors. α-Endorphin has the same C-terminal sequence of β-LPH, allowing these peptides to have a high affinity for opiate binding sites. Even a slight difference in the C-terminal amino acid can have drastic effects on avoidance behavior. The importance in sequencing determines the function of the endorphin. When an N-terminal amino acid such as tyrosine is removed, there seems to be no significant impacts on avoidance behavior. However, when there are adjustments to the C-terminal sequence, like removing β-LPH 61-65; activity of the endorphin decreases.

== See also ==
- Endorphin
- Amphetamines
