= Γ-Endorphin =

γ-Endorphin

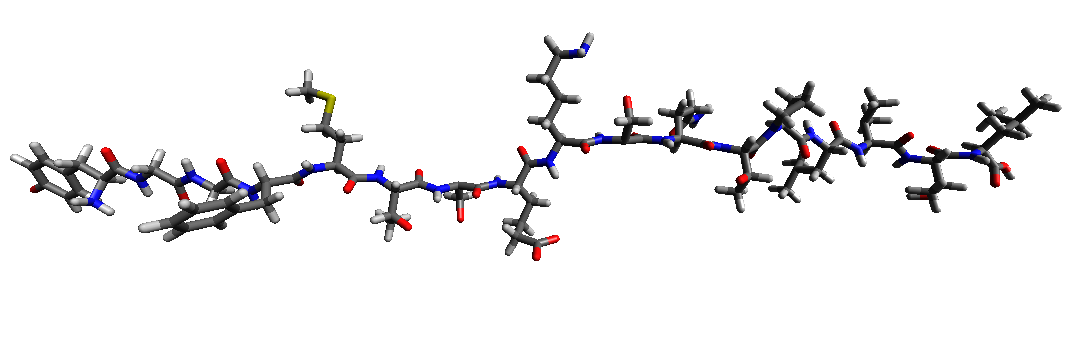

Names
- Other names Tyr-Gly-Gly-Phe-Met-Thr-Ser-Glu-Lys-Ser-Gln-Thr-Pro-Leu-Val-Thr-Leu

Identifiers
CAS Number	61512-77-4
3D model (JSmol)	Interactive image
ChEBI	CHEBI:80246
ChemSpider	17294517
KEGG	C16018
PubChem CID	16138008
UNII	A65G32VJ2M
- InChI: InChI=1S/C83H131N19O27S/c1-41(2)33-55(75(120)98-65(43(5)6)79(124)100-67(45(8)106)80(125)95-57(83(128)129)34-42(3)4)94-78(123)60-20-16-31-102(60)82(127)68(46(9)107)101-72(117)52(25-27-61(86)109)91-76(121)58(39-103)96-70(115)51(19-14-15-30-84)90-71(116)53(26-28-64(112)113)92-77(122)59(40-104)97-81(126)66(44(7)105)99-73(118)54(29-32-130-10)93-74(119)56(36-47-17-12-11-13-18-47)89-63(111)38-87-62(110)37-88-69(114)50(85)35-48-21-23-49(108)24-22-48/h11-13,17-18,21-24,41-46,50-60,65-68,103-108H,14-16,19-20,25-40,84-85H2,1-10H3,(H2,86,109)(H,87,110)(H,88,114)(H,89,111)(H,90,116)(H,91,121)(H,92,122)(H,93,119)(H,94,123)(H,95,125)(H,96,115)(H,97,126)(H,98,120)(H,99,118)(H,100,124)(H,101,117)(H,112,113)(H,128,129)/t44-,45-,46-,50+,51+,52+,53+,54+,55+,56+,57+,58+,59+,60+,65+,66+,67+,68+/m1/s1 Key: GASYAMBJHBRTOE-WHDBNHDESA-N
- SMILES: C[C@H]([C@@H](C(=O)N[C@@H](CO)C(=O)N[C@@H](CCC(=O)O)C(=O)N[C@@H](CCCCN)C(=O)N[C@@H](CO)C(=O)N[C@@H](CCC(=O)N)C(=O)N[C@@H]([C@@H](C)O)C(=O)N1CCC[C@H]1C(=O)N[C@@H](CC(C)C)C(=O)N[C@@H](C(C)C)C(=O)N[C@@H]([C@@H](C)O)C(=O)N[C@@H](CC(C)C)C(=O)O)NC(=O)[C@H](CCSC)NC(=O)[C@H](CC2=CC=CC=C2)NC(=O)CNC(=O)CNC(=O)[C@H](CC3=CC=C(C=C3)O)N)O

Properties
Chemical formula	C_{83}H_{131}N_{19}O_{27}S
Molar mass	1859.10434
- Except where otherwise noted, data are given for materials in their standard state (at 25 °C [77 °F], 100 kPa). verify (what is ?) Infobox references

γ-Endorphin (gamma-endorphin) is an opioid peptide that is characterized by the presence of 17 amino acids. The first 16 amino acids are identical to α-endorphin; leucine added at the end. In addition, γ-endorphin is identical to the first 17 amino acids of β-endorphin. Similar to other endorphins, research focusing upon γ-endorphin has been ongoing since its discovery in the 1970s. Yet, most of the information about the substance's exact role within the body is speculation that has yet to be proven. Some studies have indicated, however, that the polypeptide has antipsychotic effects on a certain category of patients with schizophrenia, while others suggest that γ-endorphin may act to help regulate blood pressure. Further research is needed, but if γ-endorphin does indeed possess such characteristics, the substance could eventually be utilized as a useful means of medical treatment.

It has been hypothesized that γ-endorphin may play a role in substance abuse, as well as neurological problems. The DRD2 gene regulates dopamine to which any mutation in this gene can lead to neurological and psychological disorders. It has been shown in a that a lack of γ-endorphin in utero leads to the DRD2-A2 allele over-expression. The DRD2-A1 allele increases the desire for alcohol and has been shown to be associated with a low γ-endorphin count. The argument of γ-endorphin relating to psychological issues is strong; however, more testing would need to be done to confirm this.

γ-Endorphin resides in the pituitary gland of humans, as well as in other animals such as rats. An experiment was performed where two human pituitary glands were made available, and through various procedures like gel filtration chromatography and high-performance chromatography, 0.7 nmol of γ-endorphin was found.
