= Β-Endorphin =

Peptide hormone in humans

β-Endorphin

Names
- IUPAC name L-Tyrosylglycylglycyl-L-phenylalanyl-L-methionyl-L-threonyl-L-seryl-L-glutaminyl-L-lysyl-L-seryl-L-glutaminyl-L-threonyl-L-prolyl-L-leucyl-L-valyl-L-threonyl-L-leucyl-L-phenylalanyl-L-lysyl-L-asparaginyl-L-alanyl-L-isoleucyl-L-isoleucyl-L-lysyl-L-asparaginyl-L-alanyl-L-tyrosyl-L-lysyl-L-lysylglycyl-L-glutamine

Identifiers
CAS Number	60617-12-1
3D model (JSmol)	Interactive image
ChEBI	CHEBI:10415
ChemSpider	28184601
ECHA InfoCard	100.056.646
IUPHAR/BPS	1643
PubChem CID	16132316
UNII	3S51P4W3XQ
- InChI: InChI=1S/C158H253N41O44S/c1-17-84(9)126(153(237)184-102(44-29-34-65-163)137(221)188-112(74-120(168)210)142(226)173-86(11)131(215)185-110(73-94-48-52-96(206)53-49-94)146(230)179-99(41-26-31-62-160)135(219)177-98(40-25-30-61-159)134(218)172-78-124(214)175-106(158(242)243)56-59-119(167)209)195-154(238)127(85(10)18-2)194-132(216)87(12)174-143(227)113(75-121(169)211)187-136(220)100(42-27-32-63-161)180-147(231)111(72-92-38-23-20-24-39-92)186-144(228)107(68-81(3)4)190-155(239)129(89(14)203)197-152(236)125(83(7)8)193-148(232)108(69-82(5)6)189-151(235)116-45-35-66-199(116)157(241)130(90(15)204)198-140(224)104(55-58-118(166)208)182-149(233)114(79-200)191-138(222)101(43-28-33-64-162)178-139(223)103(54-57-117(165)207)181-150(234)115(80-201)192-156(240)128(88(13)202)196-141(225)105(60-67-244-16)183-145(229)109(71-91-36-21-19-22-37-91)176-123(213)77-170-122(212)76-171-133(217)97(164)70-93-46-50-95(205)51-47-93/h19-24,36-39,46-53,81-90,97-116,125-130,200-206H,17-18,25-35,40-45,54-80,159-164H2,1-16H3,(H2,165,207)(H2,166,208)(H2,167,209)(H2,168,210)(H2,169,211)(H,170,212)(H,171,217)(H,172,218)(H,173,226)(H,174,227)(H,175,214)(H,176,213)(H,177,219)(H,178,223)(H,179,230)(H,180,231)(H,181,234)(H,182,233)(H,183,229)(H,184,237)(H,185,215)(H,186,228)(H,187,220)(H,188,221)(H,189,235)(H,190,239)(H,191,222)(H,192,240)(H,193,232)(H,194,216)(H,195,238)(H,196,225)(H,197,236)(H,198,224)(H,242,243)/t84-,85-,86-,87-,88+,89+,90+,97-,98-,99-,100-,101-,102-,103-,104-,105-,106-,107-,108-,109-,110-,111-,112-,113-,114-,115-,116-,125-,126-,127-,128-,129-,130-/m0/s1 Key: WOPZMFQRCBYPJU-NTXHZHDSSA-N; InChI=1/C158H253N41O44S/c1-17-84(9)126(153(237)184-102(44-29-34-65-163)137(221)188-112(74-120(168)210)142(226)173-86(11)131(215)185-110(73-94-48-52-96(206)53-49-94)146(230)179-99(41-26-31-62-160)135(219)177-98(40-25-30-61-159)134(218)172-78-124(214)175-106(158(242)243)56-59-119(167)209)195-154(238)127(85(10)18-2)194-132(216)87(12)174-143(227)113(75-121(169)211)187-136(220)100(42-27-32-63-161)180-147(231)111(72-92-38-23-20-24-39-92)186-144(228)107(68-81(3)4)190-155(239)129(89(14)203)197-152(236)125(83(7)8)193-148(232)108(69-82(5)6)189-151(235)116-45-35-66-199(116)157(241)130(90(15)204)198-140(224)104(55-58-118(166)208)182-149(233)114(79-200)191-138(222)101(43-28-33-64-162)178-139(223)103(54-57-117(165)207)181-150(234)115(80-201)192-156(240)128(88(13)202)196-141(225)105(60-67-244-16)183-145(229)109(71-91-36-21-19-22-37-91)176-123(213)77-170-122(212)76-171-133(217)97(164)70-93-46-50-95(205)51-47-93/h19-24,36-39,46-53,81-90,97-116,125-130,200-206H,17-18,25-35,40-45,54-80,159-164H2,1-16H3,(H2,165,207)(H2,166,208)(H2,167,209)(H2,168,210)(H2,169,211)(H,170,212)(H,171,217)(H,172,218)(H,173,226)(H,174,227)(H,175,214)(H,176,213)(H,177,219)(H,178,223)(H,179,230)(H,180,231)(H,181,234)(H,182,233)(H,183,229)(H,184,237)(H,185,215)(H,186,228)(H,187,220)(H,188,221)(H,189,235)(H,190,239)(H,191,222)(H,192,240)(H,193,232)(H,194,216)(H,195,238)(H,196,225)(H,197,236)(H,198,224)(H,242,243)/t84-,85-,86-,87-,88+,89+,90+,97-,98-,99-,100-,101-,102-,103-,104-,105-,106-,107-,108-,109-,110-,111-,112-,113-,114-,115-,116-,125-,126-,127-,128-,129-,130-/m0/s1 Key: WOPZMFQRCBYPJU-NTXHZHDSBY
- SMILES: CC[C@H](C)[C@@H](C(=O)N[C@@H]([C@@H](C)CC)C(=O)N[C@@H](CCCCN)C(=O)N[C@@H](CC(=O)N)C(=O)N[C@@H](C)C(=O)N[C@@H](Cc1ccc(cc1)O)C(=O)N[C@@H](CCCCN)C(=O)N[C@@H](CCCCN)C(=O)NCC(=O)N[C@@H](CCC(=O)N)C(=O)O)NC(=O)[C@H](C)NC(=O)[C@H](CC(=O)N)NC(=O)[C@H](CCCCN)NC(=O)[C@H](Cc2ccccc2)NC(=O)[C@H](CC(C)C)NC(=O)[C@H]([C@@H](C)O)NC(=O)[C@H](C(C)C)NC(=O)[C@H](CC(C)C)NC(=O)[C@@H]3CCCN3C(=O)[C@H]([C@@H](C)O)NC(=O)[C@H](CCC(=O)N)NC(=O)[C@H](CO)NC(=O)[C@H](CCCCN)NC(=O)[C@H](CCC(=O)N)NC(=O)[C@H](CO)NC(=O)[C@H]([C@@H](C)O)NC(=O)[C@H](CCSC)NC(=O)[C@H](Cc4ccccc4)NC(=O)CNC(=O)CNC(=O)[C@H](Cc5ccc(cc5)O)N

Properties
Chemical formula	C_{158}H_{251}N_{39}O_{46}S
Molar mass	3465.03 g·mol^{−1}
- Except where otherwise noted, data are given for materials in their standard state (at 25 °C [77 °F], 100 kPa). verify (what is ?) Infobox references

β-Endorphin (beta-endorphin) is an endogenous opioid neuropeptide and peptide hormone that is produced in certain neurons within the central nervous system and peripheral nervous system. It is one of three endorphins that are produced in humans, the others being α-endorphin and γ-endorphin.

There are multiple forms of β-endorphin with the full sequence of Tyr-Gly-Gly-Phe-Met-Thr-Ser-Glu-Lys-Ser-Gln-Thr-Pro-Leu-Val-Thr-Leu-Phe-Lys-Asn-Ala-Ile-Ile-Lys-Asn-Ala-Tyr-Lys-Lys-Gly-Glu (31 amino acids) denoted as β-endorphin(1-31) and variants truncated to the first 26 and 27 amino acids as β-endorphin(1-26) and β-endorphin(1-27). However, β-endorphin(1-31) is the only form that possess a potent analgesic effect and it is the primary form located in the anterior pituitary gland, and regions such as the hypothalamus, midbrain, and amygdala. The first 16 amino acids are identical to α-endorphin. β-Endorphin is considered to be a part of the endogenous opioid and endorphin classes of neuropeptides; all of the established endogenous opioid peptides contain the same N-terminal amino acid sequence, Tyr-Gly-Gly-Phe, followed by either -Met or -Leu.

Function of β-endorphin has been known to be associated with hunger, thrill, pain, maternal care, sexual behavior, and reward cognition. In the broadest sense, β-endorphin is primarily utilized in the body to reduce stress and maintain homeostasis. In behavioral research, studies have shown that β-endorphin is released via volume transmission into the ventricular system in response to a variety of stimuli, and novel stimuli in particular.

== Formation and structure ==
β-Endorphin is found in neurons of the hypothalamus, as well as the pituitary gland. It is derived from β-lipotropin, which is produced in the pituitary gland from a larger peptide precursor, proopiomelanocortin (POMC). POMC is cleaved into two neuropeptides, adrenocorticotropic hormone (ACTH) and β-lipotropin. The formation of β-endorphin is then the result of cleavage of the C-terminal region of β-lipotropin, producing a 31 amino acid-long neuropeptide with an alpha-helical secondary structure. However, POMC also gives rise to other peptide hormones, including α- and γ-melanocyte-stimulating hormone (MSH), resulting from intracellular processing by internal enzymes known as prohormone convertases.

A significant factor that differentiates β-endorphin from other endogenous opioids is its high affinity for and lasting effect on μ-opioid receptors. The structure of β-endorphin in part accounts for this through its resistance to proteolytic enzymes, as its secondary structure makes it less vulnerable to degradation.

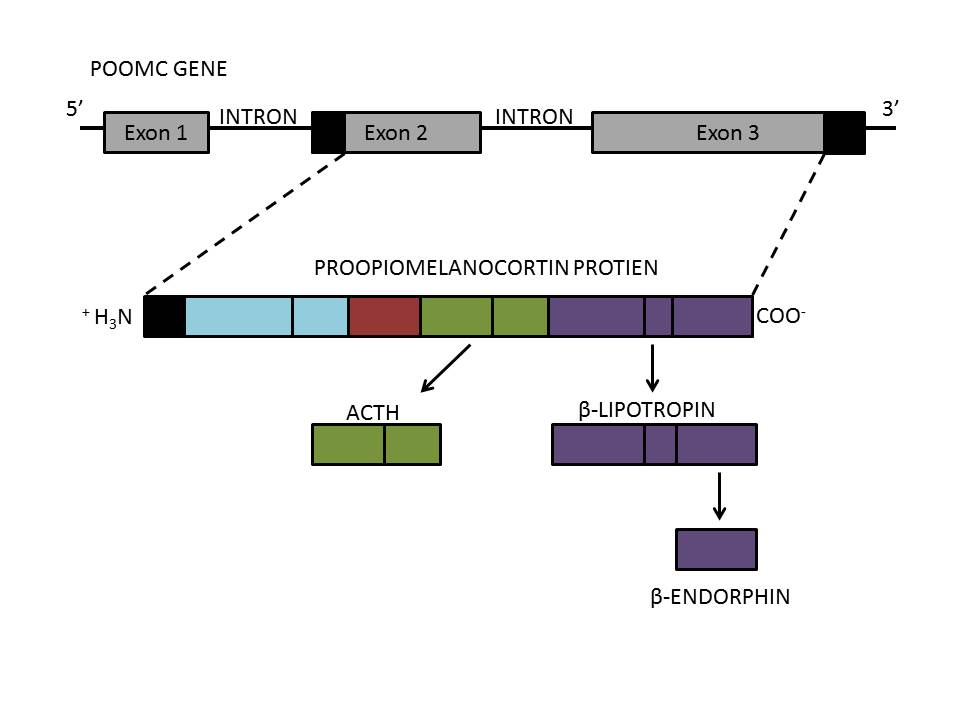
This diagram depicts the formation of β-endorphin from the proopiomelanocortin gene in the pituitary gland. Portions of the second and third exon of this gene make up the proopiomelanocortin protein. The cleavage of the C-terminal end of this protein produces β-lipotropin, which is then cleaved again to form β-endorphin. The proopiomelanocortin protein is also a precursor to other neuropeptides and hormones, such as adrenocorticotropic hormone.

A skeletal diagram showing the amino acid sequence of beta-endorphin with each amino acid labeled.

== Function and effects ==
β-Endorphin function is said to be divided into two main categories: local function and global function. Global function of β-endorphin is related to decreasing bodily stress and maintaining homeostasis resulting in pain management, reward effects, and behavioral stability. β-Endorphin in global pathways diffuse to different parts of the body through cerebral spinal fluid in the spinal cord, allowing for β-endorphin release to affect the peripheral nervous system. Localized function of β-endorphin results in release of β-endorphin in different brain regions such as the amygdala or the hypothalamus. The two main methods by which β-endorphin is utilized in the body are peripheral hormonal action and neuroregulation. It is considered to act both as a neurotransmitter and a neuromodulator since it produces effects on distant targets that have increased stability and longevity when compared to other neurotransmitters. β-Endorphin and other enkephalins are often released with ACTH to modulate hormone system functioning. Neuroregulation by β-endorphin occurs through interference with the function of another neuropeptide, either by direct inhibition of neuropeptide release or induction of a signaling cascade that reduces a neuropeptide's effects.

=== Opioid agonist ===
β-Endorphin is an agonist of the opioid receptors; it preferentially binds to the μ-opioid receptor. Evidence suggests that it serves as a primary endogenous ligand for the μ-opioid receptor, the same receptor to which the chemicals extracted from opium, such as morphine, derive their analgesic properties. β-Endorphin has the highest binding affinity of any endogenous opioid for the μ-opioid receptor. Opioid receptors are a class of G-protein coupled receptors, such that when β-endorphin or another opioid binds, a signaling cascade is induced in the cell. Acetylation of the N-terminus of β-endorphin, however, inactivates the neuropeptide, preventing it from binding to its receptor. The opioid receptors are distributed throughout the central nervous system and within the peripheral tissue of neural and non-neural origin. They are also located in high concentrations in the periaqueductal gray, locus coeruleus, and the rostral ventromedial medulla. In addition to the full-length peptide, brain and pituitary tissue also contain shorter β-endorphin fragments such as β-endorphin(1–27), which can act as a competitive antagonist at μ-opioid receptors and attenuate the analgesic effects of β-endorphin(1–31) in experimental models.

Voltage-dependent calcium channels (VDCCs) are important membrane proteins that mediate the depolarization of neurons, and play a major role in promoting the release of neurotransmitters. When endorphin molecules bind to opioid receptors, G proteins activate and dissociate into their constituent Gα and Gβγ sub-units. The Gβγ sub-unit binds to the intracellular loop between the two trans-membrane helices of the VDCC. When the sub-unit binds to the voltage-dependent calcium channel, it produces a voltage-dependent block, which inhibits the channel, preventing the flow of calcium ions into the neuron. Embedded in the cell membrane is also the G protein-coupled inwardly-rectifying potassium channel. When a Gβγ or Gα(GTP) molecule binds to the C-terminus of the potassium channel, it becomes active, and potassium ions are pumped out of the neuron. The activation of the potassium channel and subsequent deactivation of the calcium channel causes membrane hyperpolarization. This is when there is a change in the membrane's potential, so that it becomes more negative. The reduction in calcium ions causes a reduction of neurotransmitter release because calcium is essential for this event to occur. This means that neurotransmitters such as glutamate and substance P cannot be released from the presynaptic terminal of the neurons. Substance P is a believed to help sensitize postsynaptic neurons to glutamate, aiding in the transmission of pain signals from periphery nerves to the brain. These neurotransmitters are vital in the transmission of pain, and as β-Endorphin reduces the release of these substances, there is a strong analgesic effect.

=== Pain management ===
β-Endorphin has been primarily studied for its influence on nociception (i.e., pain perception). β-endorphin modulates pain perception both in the central nervous system and the peripheral nervous system. When pain is perceived, pain receptors (nociceptors) send signals to the dorsal horn of the spinal cord and then up to the hypothalamus through the release of a neuropeptide called substance P. In the peripheral nervous system, this signal causes the recruitment of T-lymphocytes, white blood cells of the immune system, to the area where pain was perceived. T-lymphocytes release β-endorphin in this localized region, allowing it to bind to opioid receptors, causing direct inhibition of substance P. In the central nervous system, β-endorphin binds to opioid receptors in the dorsal root and inhibits the release of substance P in the spinal cord, reducing the number of excitatory pain signals sent to the brain. The hypothalamus responds to the pain signal by releasing β-endorphin through the periaqueductal grey network, which mainly acts to inhibit the release of GABA, a neurotransmitter which prevents the release of dopamine. Thus, the inhibition of GABA release by β-endorphin allows for a greater release of dopamine, in part contributing to the analgesic effect of β-endorphin. The combination of these pathways reduces pain sensation, allowing for the body to stop a pain impulse once it has been sent.

β-Endorphin has approximately 18 to 33 times the analgesic potency of morphine, though its hormonal effect is species dependent. A comparative study found that patients with chronic neuropathic pain had significantly lower cerebrospinal-fluid β-endorphin concentrations than healthy controls.

=== Exercise ===
β-Endorphin release in response to exercise has been known and studied since at least the 1980s. Studies have demonstrated that serum concentrations of endogenous opioids, in particular β-endorphin and β-lipotropin, increase in response to both acute exercise and training. The release of β-endorphin during exercise is associated with a phenomenon colloquially known in popular culture as a runner's high. Acute aerobic exercise significantly increases circulating β-endorphin concentrations, with elevations closely correlated to exercise intensity and the onset of the 'runner’s high'.

=== Sunlight ===
There is evidence that β-endorphin is released in response to ultraviolet radiation, either through sun exposure or artificial tanning. This is thought to contribute to addiction behavior among excessive sunbathers and users of artificial tanning despite health risks.

=== Addiction ===
Studies suggest that β-endorphin could be correlated with alcohol addiction due to their involvement with the brain's mesolimbic reward system. Alcohol consumption causes an increase in the release of β-endorphin within the regions of the brain's reward system. Regular and long-term consumption of alcohol consequently leads to a deficit in the levels of β-endorphin that requires continuous consumption of alcohol to replenish. Individuals with a deficiency of β-endorphin due to genetics may be more vulnerable to alcohol addiction as a result.

== Mechanism of action ==
β-Endorphin acts as an agonist that binds to various types of G protein–coupled receptors (GPCRs), most notably to the mu and kappa opioid receptors. Binding to these receptors prevents the release of Substance P in the case of the peripheral nervous system, and the inhibitory neurotransmitter, GABA, in the central nervous system The receptors are responsible for supra-spinal analgesia. Radiotracer studies show that circulating β-endorphin is not transported across the blood–brain barrier and is rapidly degraded by endothelial peptidases.

== History ==
β-Endorphin was discovered in camel pituitary extracts by C.H. Li and David Chung. The primary structure of β-endorphin was unknowingly determined 10 years earlier, when Li and colleagues analyzed the sequence of another neuropeptide produced in the pituitary gland, γ-lipotropin. They noticed that the C-terminus region of this neuropeptide was similar to that of some enkephalins, suggesting that it may have a similar function to these neuropeptides. The C-terminal sequence of γ-lipotropin turned out to be the primary sequence of the β-endorphin.
