= Tanning Tax Repeal Act of 2015 =

- Long title: To amend the Internal Revenue Code of 1986 to repeal the excise tax on indoor tanning services.
- Announced in: the 114th United States Congress
- Sponsored by: U.S. Rep. George Holding (R-NC)
- Number of co-sponsors: 111

Legislative history
- Introduced in the House as H.R. 2698 by George Holding (R–NC) on June 9, 2015; Committee consideration by United States House Committee on Ways and Means

The Tanning Tax Repeal Act of 2015 was legislation introduced in the U.S. House of Representatives by Congressman George Holding (R-NC). The bill would repeal the national 10% tax on indoor tanning services. Congressman Holding introduced the bill as H.R. 2698 on June 9, 2015.

By the end of the 114th Congress, the bill had 111 cosponsors.

== Background ==
The 10% tax on indoor tanning services went into effect in 2010. It was passed as part of the Affordable Care Act ("Obamacare"). The IRS enforces the tax: any amount paid for tanning services is subject to a 10 percent excise tax.

Obamacare included 20 new or higher taxes, and the first one to go into effect was the tanning tax. The tanning tax imposes a 10 percent excise tax on all tanning bed customers in the U.S. The tax is collected in addition to state sales tax and income taxes paid by the tanning salon owner.

Since 2010, roughly half of all tanning salons in the United States have closed. Approximately 100,000 jobs were lost due to the closures.

== Legislative history ==
The Tanning Tax Repeal Act had two main actions in the House:

- 6/9/2015: Introduced in the House
- 6/9/2015: Referred to the House Committee on Ways and Means

Although the bill was never acted upon in the Ways and Means Committee, the bill's language was incorporated into a larger piece of legislation, the Restoring Americans’ Healthcare Freedom Reconciliation Act of 2015 (H.R. 3762). That larger bill passed the House and Senate and was sent to President Barack Obama, who vetoed it. The House tried to override the veto with the required two-thirds vote, but failed to get enough votes to do so.

== See also ==
- Excise tax
- Indoor tanning
