= Runner's high =

Transient state of euphoria from physical exertion

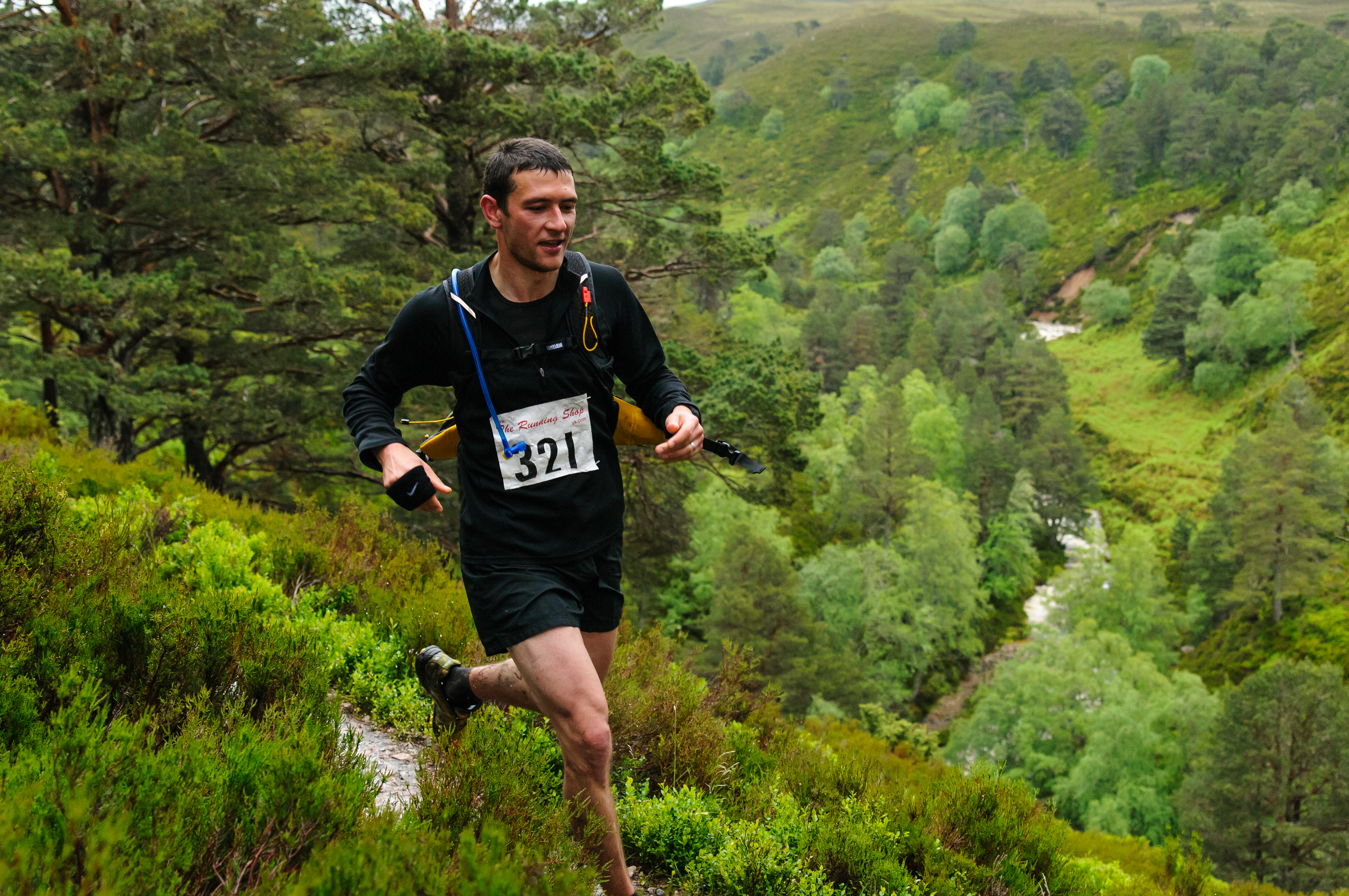
Runners can experience a euphoric state often called a "runner's high".

The runner's high is a transient state of euphoria coupled with lessened feelings of anxiety and a higher pain threshold, which can come either from continuous moderate physical exertion over time or from short bursts of high-intensity exercise. The exact prevalence is unknown, but it seems to be a relatively rare phenomenon that not every athlete experiences. The name comes from distance running, and it is alternatively called "rower's high" in rowing.

== Mechanism of action ==
Current medical reviews indicate that several endogenous euphoriants are responsible for producing exercise-related pleasurable feelings, specifically phenethylamine (an endogenous psychostimulant), β-endorphin (an endogenous opioid), and anandamide (an endogenous cannabinoid). However, more recent studies suggest that endorphins have a limited role in the feelings of euphoria specifically related to the runner's high due to their inability to cross the blood-brain barrier, placing more importance in the endocannabinoids instead, which can cross this barrier.

The release of endocannabinoids is greater during longer and more extreme periods of physical exertion, which is why the runner’s high is more associated with long distance running than sprinting. Even when the amount of endocannabinoids released is similar, the deeper concentration and positive mood changes associated with running are more common among regular runners than occasional ones, and its prevalence seems to be independent from factors such as weight, sex and age. New runners barely, if ever, report any positive feeling when running, relating a rather painful experience instead.

== Subjective experience ==
There are many different accounts of how the euphoric experience of a runner’s high feels to an individual. Many runners emphasize a feeling of lessened pain and antinociceptive responses during extreme exertion.

The runner’s high is often characterized by feeling a dissolution of boundaries and restrictions related to time, space and body, leading to a sense of pleasure.

Another common experience described by runners is a greater appreciation and association with the world around them as bodily functions related to running become a part of the subconscious. Heightened awareness, specifically of natural surroundings, relaxes the mind and leads the runner to experience a deep connection to the world around them.

The runner's high is also prevalent in those who run directly after a long term injury, as the jump from a deep sense of bodily function and pain to a flow state could cause increased feelings of euphoria.

== Athlete experiences ==
Many top athletes have reported feeling the runner’s high.

Usain Bolt, Jamaican sprinter and world record holder in the 100 meter dash, spoke on his experience with runner’s high. Bolt attributed his euphoric state to his competitive nature and the experience of achieving a personal best, as well as the hard work put into achieving his goals.

Kate Carter, Runner’s World commissioning editor and sub three hour marathon runner wrote of how her runner’s high experience helped to get her hooked on running after starting at a later age in life. Carter said her peak ecstatic experience from running was in knocking 20 seconds off her marathon personal best.
