= John Cannell =

Physician and activist

John Jacob Cannell
- Born: June 21, 1948 (age 78); United States
- Education: University of Maryland, College Park (B.S. in Zoology), University of North Carolina at Chapel Hill School of Medicine (M.D.)
- Occupations: Physician, psychiatrist, non-profit founder
- Organizations: Vitamin D Council, Friends for Education
- Known for: Anti-smoking activism, educational reform efforts, Vitamin D health hypotheses
- Notable work: Research on educational testing discrepancies, advocacy on Vitamin D health benefits
- Father: Skipwith Cannell (Imagist poet)

John Jacob Cannell (born June 21, 1948) is an American doctor. An anti-smoking activist, Cannell was featured in the New York Times in the 1980s for turning away smokers from his clinic in West Virginia. Cannell founded a nonprofit group to address perceived problems with educational testing. Cannell has described several hypotheses regarding the health benefits of Vitamin D and is the founder of the Vitamin D Council.

== Background ==
Cannell is the son of the late imagist poet Skipwith Cannell. In 1972, he graduated from the University of Maryland, College Park with a degree in Zoology. He attended medical school at the University of North Carolina at Chapel Hill and graduated in 1976. He is a member of the American Medical Association and became a board-certified psychiatrist in 1993.

== Anti-smoking stance ==
In 1988, The New York Times reported that Cannell, a doctor in Beaver, West Virginia, had taken a "novel stand" against smoking. In local advertisements, Cannell pledged to turn away from his clinic patients who were smokers. He granted an exception to those needing emergency care. Cannell's stance received praise from some medical colleagues, while others criticised his approach as fraught with potential ethical problems.

== Educational reform efforts ==
Cannell, noticing discrepancies between his young patients' performance in school and their grade level, formed the nonprofit Friends for Education to study the reported test score rankings of poverty-stricken states such as Mississippi, Louisiana, Arkansas, South Carolina, Tennessee, Georgia and Kentucky. Cannell found that all were reportedly "above the national average." Cannell extended the results to all 50 states, each of which was said to be above average. Cannell's findings prompted wider study of the issue and were reported in the national press including the New York Times, NBC News and the Wall Street Journal.

Friends for Education filed sexual discrimination complaints against Raleigh County and the West Virginia State Department of Education, claiming women held 80% of the low paying teaching jobs, but men held 80% of the higher paying administrative positions.

Friends for Education also advertised a "Dirtiest Public School in West Virginia Contest," the winner of which would receive $100.00 worth of mops, brooms, and soap from Friends for Education.

== The Vitamin D Council ==
Cannell has hypothesised that Vitamin D deficiencies may predispose to influenza. In the controversial and non-peer-reviewed journal Medical Hypotheses, Cannell also suggested a tie to autism. He founded the Vitamin D Council as a tax exempt, nonprofit, 501(c)(e) corporation and is its executive director.

== Bibliography ==
- Cannell, J.; Vieth, R.; Umhau, J.; Holick, M.; Grant, W.; Madronich, S.; Garland, C.; Giovannucci, E. (2006). "Epidemic influenza and vitamin D". Epidemiology and Infection. 134 (6): 1129–1140. doi:10.1017/S0950268806007175. PMC 2870528. PMID 16959053.
- Cannell, J. (2008). "Autism and vitamin D". Medical Hypotheses. 70 (4): 750–759. doi:10.1016/j.mehy.2007.08.016. PMID 17920208.
- Grant, W.; Cannell, J. (2010). "Pregnant women are at increased risk for severe a influenza because they have low serum 25-hydroxyvitamin D levels". Critical Care Medicine. 38 (9): 1921, author reply 1921–2. doi:10.1097/CCM.0b013e3181e28603. PMID 20724898.
- Evatt, M.; Delong, M.; Grant, W.; Cannell, J.; Tangpricha, V. (2009). "Autism spectrum disorders following in utero exposure to antiepileptic drugs". Neurology. 73 (12): 997. doi:10.1212/WNL.0b013e3181af0b95. PMID 19770480. S2CID 207115638.
- Cannell, J. J. (2010). "On the aetiology of autism". Acta Paediatrica. 99 (8): 1128–1130. doi:10.1111/j.1651-2227.2010.01883.x. PMC 2913107. PMID 20491697.
- Cannell, J.; Zasloff, M.; Garland, C.; Scragg, R.; Giovannucci, E. (2009). "On the epidemiology of influenza: reply to Radonovich et al". Virology Journal. 6: 121. doi:10.1186/1743-422X-6-121. PMC 2729747. PMID 19671177.
- Cannell, J. J.; Hollis, B. W.; Sorenson, M. B.; Taft, T. N.; Anderson, J. J. B. (2009). "Athletic Performance and Vitamin D". Medicine & Science in Sports & Exercise. 41 (5): 1102–10. doi:10.1249/MSS.0b013e3181930c2b. PMID 19346976.
- Cannell, J. J.; Vieth, R.; Willett, W.; Zasloff, M.; Hathcock, J. N.; White, J. H.; Tanumihardjo, S. A.; Larson-Meyer, D. E.; Bischoff-Ferrari, H. A.; Lamberg-Allardt, C. J.; Lappe, J. M.; Norman, A. W.; Zittermann, A.; Whiting, S. J.; Grant, W. B.; Hollis, B. W.; Giovannucci, E. (2008). "Cod liver oil, vitamin a toxicity, frequent respiratory infections, and the vitamin D deficiency epidemic". The Annals of Otology, Rhinology, and Laryngology. 117 (11): 864–870. doi:10.1177/000348940811701112. PMID 19102134. S2CID 31269560.
- Cannell, J. (2008). "Discovering the obvious, damaging the defenseless". Nutrition Research. 28 (11): 809–10. doi:10.1016/j.nutres.2008.09.008. PMC 2598748. PMID 19083492.
- Cannell, JJ; Hollis, BW (2008). "Use of vitamin D in clinical practice". Alternative Medicine Review. 13 (1): 6–20. PMID 18377099.
- Cannell, J. J.; Zasloff, M.; Garland, C. F.; Scragg, R.; Giovannucci, E. (2008). "On the epidemiology of influenza". Virology Journal. 5: 29. doi:10.1186/1743-422X-5-29. PMC 2279112. PMID 18298852.
- Cannell, J.; Hollis, B.; Zasloff, M.; Heaney, R. (2008). "Diagnosis and treatment of vitamin D deficiency". Expert Opinion on Pharmacotherapy. 9 (1): 107–118. doi:10.1517/14656566.9.1.107. PMID 18076342. S2CID 18737820.
  - Cannell, J.; Hudson, J. I.; Pope Jr, H. G. (2001). "Standards for informed consent in recovered memory therapy". The Journal of the American Academy of Psychiatry and the Law. 29 (2): 138–147. PMID 11471779.
- Cannell, J. J. (1987). "Nationally Normed Elementary Achievement Testing in America's Public Schools: How All Fifty States are Above the National Average". Nonpartisan Education Review. 13 (1): 1–17.
- Cannell, J. J. (1989). "How Public Educators Cheat on Standardized Achievement Tests: The "Lake Wobegon" Report" (PDF). Nonpartisan Education Review. 13 (2): 1–125.
- Cannell, J. J. (2005). ""Lake Woebegone," Twenty Years Later". Nonpartisan Education Review. 2 (1): 1–14.
