= Indoor tanning lotion =

Indoor cosmetic product

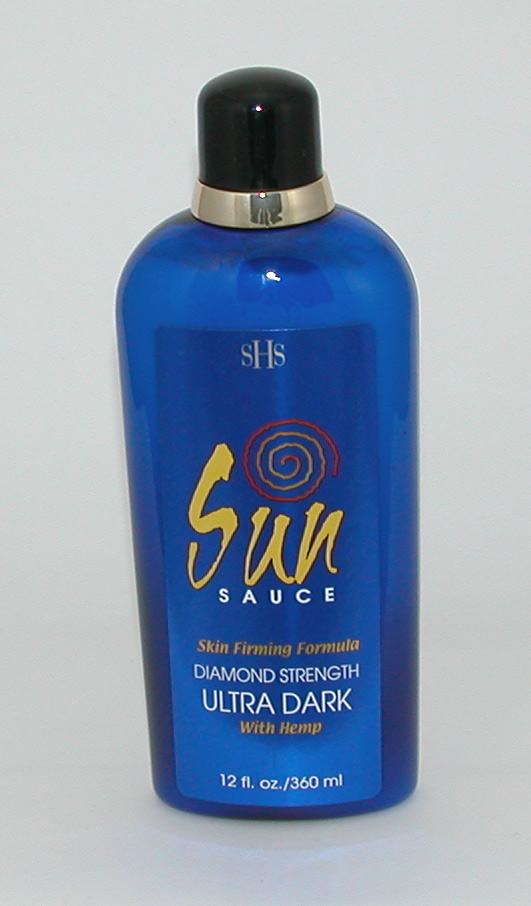
A typical bottle of indoor tanning lotion

Indoor tanning lotions accelerate the tanning process, by promoting the production of melanin. Increasing blood flow to the skin is a proposed mechanism, which may in turn stimulate production of melanin by melanocytes. Historically, indoor tanning lotions have contained no sunscreen and offer no protection from the sun. However, many tanning lotions currently contain sunscreen. Unlike sunless tanning lotions, these are designed for use with an ultraviolet source such as a tanning bed or booth.

== Ingredients ==
Some of the active ingredients found in common tanning lotions include melanin and L-Tyrosine. Other commonly found ingredients include tea oil, copper (in many different chemical compounds), green tea extract and many other natural oils. Indoor tanning lotions are usually designed to only use ingredients that will not cause damage or build up on acrylic surfaces. This is because all tanning beds use 100% acrylic in their protective shields. This is one reason people should not use outdoor tanning lotion in a tanning bed, as some common ingredients such as mineral oil (common ingredient in cosmetics, including some baby oil brands) will damage the surface of the acrylics.

Tingle is a standard description for indoor tanning lotions that contain ingredients that increase blood flow at the skin level, or cause a "tingling" sensation.

=== Bronzers ===
Some lotions have a bronzing effect to them. There are three different types of bronzers; cosmetic, natural and DHA. DHA (dihydroxyacetone) is a higher level of bronzer that stays on the skin for about 4–5 days depending on how much one exfoliates. Natural bronzers that are made from plant extracts, and stay on the skin for about 3–4 days, also exist. Cosmetic bronzers stain the skin the most, they stay on the skin for about 1–3 days and can be easily washed off in the shower. These bronzers work with the skin to provide a darker cosmetic color. They take approximately 4–6 hours to develop full color. Having a base tan before using a bronzer produces a more natural looking color. Natural bronzers use natural ingredients, such as caramel, riboflavin, etc. These ingredients provide a slight instant boost of color, but will wash off in the shower.

Higher quality natural bronzer lotions will have certain organic ingredients/natural or exotic extracts that aid in the process of tanning (melanin production/oxidization).

=== Moisturizing ===
One of the primary purposes for using indoor tanning lotions is to moisturize the skin. This is because tanning (indoors or out) can dehydrate the skin so additional moisturization is needed to compensate and leave the skin looking smooth and healthy. One of the most popular moisturizing elements in tanning lotions is hempseed oil, although other oils are also common. The primary moisturizing ingredients in tanning lotions are essentially the same as in regular hand lotions, although they tend to have less alcohol in them.

== Outdoor use ==
Most indoor tanning lotions do not offer protection from the sun (have no SPF) and are not intended for outdoor use. However, many tanning lotions now contain SPF.

== See also ==
- Indoor tanning
